= List of Sphingidae species =

This is a species list for the family Sphingidae of moths (Lepidoptera), commonly known as hawk-moths. This list contains all known species of Sphingidae in order of subfamily. There should be about 1,288 species listed. There are three subfamilies:

- Subfamily Macroglossinae
- Subfamily Smerinthinae
- Subfamily Sphinginae

The species list is given below.

== Subfamily Macroglossinae ==
=== Genus Acosmerycoides ===
- Acosmerycoides harterti

=== Genus Acosmeryx ===
- Acosmeryx anceus
- Acosmeryx beatae
- Acosmeryx castanea
- Acosmeryx formosana
- Acosmeryx hoenei
- Acosmeryx miskini
- Acosmeryx miskinoides
- Acosmeryx naga
- Acosmeryx omissa
- Acosmeryx pseudomissa
- Acosmeryx sericeus
- Acosmeryx shervillii
- Acosmeryx sinjaevi
- Acosmeryx socrates
- Acosmeryx tenggarensis

=== Genus Aellopos ===
- Aellopos blaini
- Aellopos ceculus
- Aellopos clavipes
- Aellopos fadus
- Aellopos tantalus
- Aellopos titan

=== Genus Aleuron ===
- Aleuron carinata
- Aleuron chloroptera
- Aleuron cymographum
- Aleuron iphis
- Aleuron neglectum
- Aleuron prominens
- Aleuron ypanemae

=== Genus Ampelophaga ===
- Ampelophaga dolichoides
- Ampelophaga khasiana
- Ampelophaga nikolae
- Ampelophaga rubiginosa
- Ampelophaga thomasi

=== Genus Amphion ===
- Amphion floridensis

=== Genus Angonyx ===
- Angonyx boisduvali
- Angonyx chelsea
- Angonyx kai
- Angonyx krishna
- Angonyx meeki
- Angonyx papuana
- Angonyx testacea
- Angonyx williami

=== Genus Antinephele ===
- Antinephele achlora
- Antinephele anomala
- Antinephele camerunensis
- Antinephele efulani
- Antinephele lunulata
- Antinephele maculifera
- Antinephele marcida
- Antinephele muscosa

=== Genus Atemnora ===
- Atemnora westermannii

=== Genus Baniwa ===
- Baniwa yavitensis

=== Genus Barbourion ===
- Barbourion lemaii

=== Genus Basiothia ===
- Basiothia aureata
- Basiothia charis
- Basiothia laticornis
- Basiothia medea
- Basiothia schenki

=== Genus Callionima ===
- Callionima acuta
- Callionima calliomenae
- Callionima denticulata
- Callionima elainae
- Callionima ellacombei
- Callionima falcifera
- Callionima gracilis
- Callionima grisescens
- Callionima guiarti
- Callionima inuus
- Callionima juliane
- Callionima nomius
- Callionima pan
- Callionima parce
- Callionima ramsdeni

=== Genus Cautethia ===
- Cautethia carsusi
- Cautethia exuma
- Cautethia grotei
- Cautethia noctuiformis
- Cautethia simitia
- Cautethia spuria
- Cautethia yucatana

=== Genus Cechenena ===
- Cechenena aegrota
- Cechenena catori
- Cechenena chimaera
- Cechenena helops
- Cechenena lineosa
- Cechenena minor
- Cechenena mirabilis
- Cechenena pollux
- Cechenena scotti
- Cechenena sperlingi
- Cechenena subangustata
- Cechenena transpacifica

=== Genus Centroctena ===
- Centroctena imitans
- Centroctena rutherfordi

=== Genus Cephonodes ===
- Cephonodes apus
- Cephonodes armatus
- Cephonodes banksi
- Cephonodes hylas
- Cephonodes janus
- Cephonodes kingii
- Cephonodes leucogaster
- Cephonodes lifuensis
- Cephonodes novebudensis
- Cephonodes picus
- Cephonodes rothschildi
- Cephonodes rufescens
- Cephonodes santome
- Cephonodes tamsi
- Cephonodes titan
- Cephonodes trochilus
- Cephonodes woodfordii
- Cephonodes xanthus

=== Genus Chaerocina ===
- Chaerocina dohertyi
- Chaerocina ellisoni
- Chaerocina jordani
- Chaerocina livingstonensis
- Chaerocina mbiziensis
- Chaerocina meridionalis
- Chaerocina nyikiana
- Chaerocina usambarensis
- Chaerocina zomba

=== Genus Cizara ===
- Cizara ardeniae
- Cizara sculpta

=== Genus Clarina ===
- Clarina kotschyi
- Clarina syriaca

=== Genus Dahira ===
- Dahira bruno
- Dahira falcata
- Dahira hoenei
- Dahira jitkae
- Dahira kitchingi
- Dahira klaudiae
- Dahira marisae
- Dahira nili
- Dahira niphaphylla
- Dahira obliquifascia
- Dahira pinratanai
- Dahira plutenkoi
- Dahira rebeccae
- Dahira rubiginosa
- Dahira svetsinjaevae
- Dahira taiwana
- Dahira tridens
- Dahira uljanae
- Dahira viksinjaevi
- Dahira yunlongensis
- Dahira yunnanfuana

=== Genus Daphnis ===
- Daphnis dohertyi
- Daphnis hayesi
- Daphnis hypothous
- Daphnis layardii
- Daphnis minima
- Daphnis moorei
- Daphnis nerii
- Daphnis placida
- Daphnis protrudens
- Daphnis torenia
- Daphnis vriesi

=== Genus Darapsa ===
- Darapsa choerilus
- Darapsa myron
- Darapsa versicolor

=== Genus Deidamia ===
- Deidamia inscriptum

=== Genus Deilephila ===
- Deilephila askoldensis
- Deilephila elpenor
- Deilephila porcellus
- Deilephila rivularis

=== Genus Elibia ===
- Elibia dolichus
- Elibia linigera

=== Genus Enpinanga ===
- Enpinanga assamensis
- Enpinanga borneensis
- Enpinanga vigens

=== Genus Enyo ===
- Enyo bathus
- Enyo boisduvali
- Enyo cavifer
- Enyo gorgon
- Enyo latipennis
- Enyo lugubris
- Enyo ocypete
- Enyo taedium

=== Genus Erinnyis ===
- Erinnyis alope
- Erinnyis crameri
- Erinnyis ello
- Erinnyis guttularis
- Erinnyis impunctata
- Erinnyis lassauxii
- Erinnyis obscura
- Erinnyis oenotrus
- Erinnyis pallida
- Erinnyis stheno
- Erinnyis yucatana

=== Genus Euchloron ===
- Euchloron megaera

=== Genus Eumorpha ===
- Eumorpha achemon
- Eumorpha adamsi
- Eumorpha analis
- Eumorpha anchemolus
- Eumorpha capronnieri
- Eumorpha cissi
- Eumorpha drucei
- Eumorpha elisa
- Eumorpha fasciatus
- Eumorpha intermedia
- Eumorpha labruscae
- Eumorpha megaeacus
- Eumorpha mirificatus
- Eumorpha neuburgeri
- Eumorpha obliquus
- Eumorpha pandorus
- Eumorpha phorbas
- Eumorpha satellitia
- Eumorpha strenua
- Eumorpha translineatus
- Eumorpha triangulum
- Eumorpha typhon
- Eumorpha vitis

=== Genus Eupanacra ===
- Eupanacra angulata
- Eupanacra automedon
- Eupanacra busiris
- Eupanacra cadioui
- Eupanacra elegantulus
- Eupanacra greetae
- Eupanacra harmani
- Eupanacra hollowayi
- Eupanacra malayana
- Eupanacra metallica
- Eupanacra micholitzi
- Eupanacra mindanaensis
- Eupanacra mydon
- Eupanacra perfecta
- Eupanacra poulardi
- Eupanacra psaltria
- Eupanacra pulchella
- Eupanacra radians
- Eupanacra regularis
- Eupanacra sinuata
- Eupanacra splendens
- Eupanacra tiridates
- Eupanacra treadawayi
- Eupanacra variolosa
- Eupanacra waloensis

=== Genus Euproserpinus ===
- Euproserpinus euterpe
- Euproserpinus phaeton
- Euproserpinus wiesti

=== Genus Eupyrrhoglossum ===
- Eupyrrhoglossum corvus
- Eupyrrhoglossum sagra
- Eupyrrhoglossum ventustum

=== Genus Eurypteryx ===
- Eurypteryx alleni
- Eurypteryx bhaga
- Eurypteryx dianae
- Eurypteryx falcata
- Eurypteryx geoffreyi
- Eurypteryx molucca
- Eurypteryx obtruncata
- Eurypteryx shelfordi

=== Genus Giganteopalpus ===
- Giganteopalpus mirabilis

=== Genus Gnathothlibus ===
- Gnathothlibus australiensis
- Gnathothlibus brendelli
- Gnathothlibus collardi
- Gnathothlibus dabrera
- Gnathothlibus eras
- Gnathothlibus erotus
- Gnathothlibus fijiensis
- Gnathothlibus heliodes
- Gnathothlibus meeki
- Gnathothlibus saccoi
- Gnathothlibus samoaensis
- Gnathothlibus vanuatuensis

=== Genus Griseosphinx ===
- Griseosphinx marchandi
- Griseosphinx preechari

=== Genus Hayesiana ===
- Hayesiana farintaenia
- Hayesiana triopus

=== Genus Hemaris ===
- Hemaris aethra
- Hemaris affinis
- Hemaris aksana
- Hemaris alaiana
- Hemaris beresowskii
- Hemaris croatica
- Hemaris dentata
- Hemaris diffinis
- Hemaris ducalis
- Hemaris fuciformis
- Hemaris galunae
- Hemaris gracilis
- Hemaris molli
- Hemaris ottonis
- Hemaris radians
- Hemaris rubra
- Hemaris saldaitisi
- Hemaris saundersii
- Hemaris staudingeri
- Hemaris syra
- Hemaris thetis
- Hemaris thysbe
- Hemaris tityus
- Hemaris venata

=== Genus Hemeroplanes ===
- Hemeroplanes diffusa
- Hemeroplanes longistriga
- Hemeroplanes ornatus
- Hemeroplanes triptolemus

=== Genus Himantoides ===
- Himantoides undata

=== Genus Hippotion ===
- Hippotion adelinae
- Hippotion aporodes
- Hippotion aurora
- Hippotion balsaminae
- Hippotion batschii
- Hippotion boerhaviae
- Hippotion brennus
- Hippotion brunnea
- Hippotion butleri
- Hippotion celerio
- Hippotion chloris
- Hippotion commatum
- Hippotion dexippus
- Hippotion echeclus
- Hippotion eson
- Hippotion geryon
- Hippotion gracilis
- Hippotion griveaudi
- Hippotion hateleyi
- Hippotion irregularis
- Hippotion isis
- Hippotion joiceyi
- Hippotion leucocephalus
- Hippotion melichari
- Hippotion moorei
- Hippotion osiris
- Hippotion paukstadti
- Hippotion pentagramma
- Hippotion psammochroma
- Hippotion rafflesii
- Hippotion rebeli
- Hippotion rosae
- Hippotion roseipennis
- Hippotion rosetta
- Hippotion saclavorum
- Hippotion scrofa
- Hippotion socotrensis
- Hippotion stigma
- Hippotion talboti
- Hippotion velox

=== Genus Hyles ===
- Hyles annei
- Hyles apocyni
- Hyles biguttata
- Hyles calida
- Hyles centralasiae
- Hyles chamyla
- Hyles churkini
- Hyles chuvilini
- Hyles costata
- Hyles dahlii
- Hyles euphorbiae
- Hyles euphorbiarum
- Hyles gallii
- Hyles hippophaes
- Hyles lineata
- Hyles livornica
- Hyles livornicoides
- Hyles malgassica
- Hyles nervosa
- Hyles nicaea
- Hyles perkinsi
- Hyles robertsi
- Hyles salangensis
- Hyles sammuti
- Hyles siehei
- Hyles stroehlei
- Hyles tithymali
- Hyles vespertilio
- Hyles wilsoni
- Hyles zygophylli

=== Genus Hypaedalea ===
- Hypaedalea butleri
- Hypaedalea insignis
- Hypaedalea lobipennis
- Hypaedalea neglecta

=== Genus Isognathus ===
- Isognathus allamandae
- Isognathus australis
- Isognathus caricae
- Isognathus excelsior
- Isognathus leachii
- Isognathus menechus
- Isognathus mossi
- Isognathus occidentalis
- Isognathus rimosa
- Isognathus scyron
- Isognathus swainsonii

=== Genus Kloneus ===
- Kloneus babayaga

=== Genus Leucostrophus ===
- Leucostrophus alterhirundo
- Leucostrophus commasiae

=== Genus Maassenia ===
- Maassenia distincta
- Maassenia heydeni

=== Genus Macroglossum ===
- Macroglossum adustum
- Macroglossum aesalon
- Macroglossum affictitia
- Macroglossum albigutta
- Macroglossum albolineata
- Macroglossum alcedo
- Macroglossum alluaudi
- Macroglossum amoenum
- Macroglossum aquila
- Macroglossum arimasi
- Macroglossum assimilis
- Macroglossum augarra
- Macroglossum avicula
- Macroglossum backi
- Macroglossum belis
- Macroglossum bifasciata
- Macroglossum bombylans
- Macroglossum buini
- Macroglossum buruensis
- Macroglossum cadioui
- Macroglossum caldum
- Macroglossum calescens
- Macroglossum castaneum
- Macroglossum clemensi
- Macroglossum corythus
- Macroglossum dohertyi
- Macroglossum eggeri
- Macroglossum eichhorni
- Macroglossum faro
- Macroglossum fischeri
- Macroglossum fritzei
- Macroglossum fruhstorferi
- Macroglossum glaucoptera
- Macroglossum godeffroyi
- Macroglossum gyrans
- Macroglossum haslami
- Macroglossum haxairei
- Macroglossum heliophila
- Macroglossum hemichroma
- Macroglossum hirundo
- Macroglossum incredibile
- Macroglossum insipida
- Macroglossum jani
- Macroglossum joannisi
- Macroglossum kadneri
- Macroglossum kishidai
- Macroglossum kitchingi
- Macroglossum kleineri
- Macroglossum lepidum
- Macroglossum leytensis
- Macroglossum limata
- Macroglossum malitum
- Macroglossum marquesanum
- Macroglossum mediovitta
- Macroglossum meeki
- Macroglossum melanoleuca
- Macroglossum melas
- Macroglossum micacea
- Macroglossum milvus
- Macroglossum mitchellii
- Macroglossum moecki
- Macroglossum mouldsi
- Macroglossum multifascia
- Macroglossum napolovi
- Macroglossum nemesis
- Macroglossum neotroglodytus
- Macroglossum nigellum
- Macroglossum nubilum
- Macroglossum nycteris
- Macroglossum pachycerus
- Macroglossum palawana
- Macroglossum particolor
- Macroglossum passalus
- Macroglossum paukstadtorum
- Macroglossum perplexum
- Macroglossum phocinum
- Macroglossum poecilum
- Macroglossum prometheus
- Macroglossum pseudocorythus
- Macroglossum pseudoluteata
- Macroglossum pseudonigellum
- Macroglossum pyrrhosticta
- Macroglossum rectans
- Macroglossum regulus
- Macroglossum reithi
- Macroglossum ronja
- Macroglossum saga
- Macroglossum schnitzleri
- Macroglossum semifasciata
- Macroglossum sitiene
- Macroglossum soror
- Macroglossum spilonotum
- Macroglossum stellatarum
- Macroglossum stenoxanthum
- Macroglossum stevensi
- Macroglossum stigma
- Macroglossum sulai
- Macroglossum svetlana
- Macroglossum sylvia
- Macroglossum tangalleum
- Macroglossum tenebrosa
- Macroglossum tenimberi
- Macroglossum trigi
- Macroglossum trochilus
- Macroglossum ungues
- Macroglossum vacillans
- Macroglossum vadenberghi
- Macroglossum variegatum
- Macroglossum vicinum
- Macroglossum vidua
- Macroglossum wolframmeyi

=== Genus Madoryx ===
- Madoryx bubastus
- Madoryx oiclus
- Madoryx plutonius
- Madoryx pseudothyreus

=== Genus Micracosmeryx ===
- Micracosmeryx chaochauensis

=== Genus Microsphinx ===
- Microsphinx pumilum

=== Genus Neogurelca ===
- Neogurelca himachala
- Neogurelca hyas
- Neogurelca masuriensis
- Neogurelca montana
- Neogurelca mulleri
- Neogurelca sonorensis

=== Genus Nephele ===
- Nephele accentifera
- Nephele aequivalens
- Nephele argentifera
- Nephele bipartita
- Nephele comma
- Nephele comoroana
- Nephele densoi
- Nephele discifera
- Nephele funebris
- Nephele hespera
- Nephele joiceyi
- Nephele lannini
- Nephele leighi
- Nephele maculosa
- Nephele monostigma
- Nephele oenopion
- Nephele peneus
- Nephele rectangulata
- Nephele rosae
- Nephele subvaria
- Nephele vau
- Nephele xylina

=== Genus Nyceryx ===
- Nyceryx alophus
- Nyceryx brevis
- Nyceryx coffaeae
- Nyceryx continua
- Nyceryx draudti
- Nyceryx ericea
- Nyceryx eximia
- Nyceryx fernandezi
- Nyceryx furtadoi
- Nyceryx hyposticta
- Nyceryx janzeni
- Nyceryx lunaris
- Nyceryx magna
- Nyceryx maxwelli
- Nyceryx mielkei
- Nyceryx nephus
- Nyceryx nictitans
- Nyceryx riscus
- Nyceryx stuarti
- Nyceryx tacita

=== Genus Odontosida ===
- Odontosida magnificum
- Odontosida pusillus

=== Genus Oryba ===
- Oryba achemenides
- Oryba kadeni

=== Genus Pachygonidia ===
- Pachygonidia caliginosa
- Pachygonidia drucei
- Pachygonidia hopfferi
- Pachygonidia martini
- Pachygonidia mielkei
- Pachygonidia odile
- Pachygonidia ribbei
- Pachygonidia subhamata

=== Genus Pachylia ===
- Pachylia darceta
- Pachylia ficus
- Pachylia syces

=== Genus Pachylioides ===
- Pachylioides resumens

=== Genus Pergesa ===
- Pergesa acteus

=== Genus Perigonia ===
- Perigonia caryae
- Perigonia divisa
- Perigonia glaucescens
- Perigonia grisea
- Perigonia ilus
- Perigonia jamaicensis
- Perigonia lefebvraei
- Perigonia leucopus
- Perigonia lusca
- Perigonia manni
- Perigonia pallida
- Perigonia passerina
- Perigonia pittieri
- Perigonia stulta
- Perigonia thayeri

=== Genus Phanoxyla ===
- Phanoxyla hystrix

=== Genus Philodila ===
- Philodila astyanor

=== Genus Phryxus ===
- Phryxus caicus

=== Genus Proserpinus ===
- Proserpinus clarkiae
- Proserpinus flavofasciata
- Proserpinus gaurae
- Proserpinus juanita
- Proserpinus lucidus
- Proserpinus proserpina
- Proserpinus terlooi
- Proserpinus vega

=== Genus Protaleuron ===
- Protaleuron herbini
- Protaleuron rhodogaster

=== Genus Pseudenyo ===
- Pseudenyo benitensis

=== Genus Pseudoangonyx ===
- Pseudoangonyx excellens

=== Genus Pseudosphinx ===
- Pseudosphinx tetrio

=== Genus Rethera ===
- Rethera afghanistana
- Rethera amseli
- Rethera brandti
- Rethera komarovi

=== Genus Rhagastis ===
- Rhagastis acuta
- Rhagastis albomarginatus
- Rhagastis binoculata
- Rhagastis castor
- Rhagastis confusa
- Rhagastis diehli
- Rhagastis gloriosa
- Rhagastis hayesi
- Rhagastis lambertoni
- Rhagastis lunata
- Rhagastis meridionalis
- Rhagastis mongoliana
- Rhagastis olivacea
- Rhagastis rubetra
- Rhagastis trilineata
- Rhagastis velata

=== Genus Rhodafra ===
- Rhodafra marshalli
- Rhodafra opheltes

=== Genus Sphecodina ===
- Sphecodina abbottii
- Sphecodina caudata

=== Genus Sphingonaepiopsis ===
- Sphingonaepiopsis ansorgei
- Sphingonaepiopsis asiatica
- Sphingonaepiopsis gorgoniades
- Sphingonaepiopsis gurkoi
- Sphingonaepiopsis kuldjaensis
- Sphingonaepiopsis malgassica
- Sphingonaepiopsis nana
- Sphingonaepiopsis obscurus
- Sphingonaepiopsis pumilio

=== Genus Stolidoptera ===
- Stolidoptera cadioui
- Stolidoptera tachasara

=== Genus Temnora ===
- Temnora albilinea
- Temnora angulosa
- Temnora argyropeza
- Temnora atrofasciata
- Temnora avinoffi
- Temnora bouyeri
- Temnora burdoni
- Temnora camerounensis
- Temnora crenulata
- Temnora curtula
- Temnora dierli
- Temnora elegans
- Temnora elisabethae
- Temnora engis
- Temnora eranga
- Temnora fumosa
- Temnora funebris
- Temnora grandidieri
- Temnora griseata
- Temnora hollandi
- Temnora iapygoides
- Temnora inornatum
- Temnora kaguru
- Temnora leighi
- Temnora livida
- Temnora marginata
- Temnora masungai
- Temnora mirabilis
- Temnora murina
- Temnora namaqua
- Temnora natalis
- Temnora nephele
- Temnora nitida
- Temnora ntombi
- Temnora palpalis
- Temnora peckoveri
- Temnora plagiata
- Temnora probata
- Temnora pseudopylas
- Temnora pylades
- Temnora pylas
- Temnora radiata
- Temnora rattrayi
- Temnora reutlingeri
- Temnora robertsoni
- Temnora rungwe
- Temnora sardanus
- Temnora scheveni
- Temnora scitula
- Temnora spiritus
- Temnora stevensi
- Temnora subapicalis
- Temnora swynnertoni
- Temnora trapezoidea
- Temnora turlini
- Temnora uluguru
- Temnora wollastoni
- Temnora zantus

=== Genus Temnoripais ===
- Temnoripais lasti

=== Genus Theretra ===
- Theretra acuta
- Theretra alecto
- Theretra alorica
- Theretra arfakmontensis
- Theretra balienensis
- Theretra boisduvalii
- Theretra cajus
- Theretra capensis
- Theretra castanea
- Theretra catherinae
- Theretra celata
- Theretra clotho
- Theretra floresica
- Theretra gala
- Theretra gnoma
- Theretra griseomarginata
- Theretra halimuni
- Theretra hausmanni
- Theretra improvisa
- Theretra incarnata
- Theretra indistincta
- Theretra inornata
- Theretra insignis
- Theretra insularis
- Theretra japonica
- Theretra jugurtha
- Theretra kuehni
- Theretra latreillii
- Theretra lifuensis
- Theretra lomblenica
- Theretra lombokensis
- Theretra lycetus
- Theretra manilae
- Theretra mansoni
- Theretra margarita
- Theretra molops
- Theretra monteironis
- Theretra muricolor
- Theretra natashae
- Theretra nessus
- Theretra oldenlandiae
- Theretra orpheus
- Theretra pallicosta
- Theretra papuensis
- Theretra pantarica
- Theretra perkeo
- Theretra polistratus
- Theretra queenslandi
- Theretra radiosa
- Theretra rhesus
- Theretra silhetensis
- Theretra suffusa
- Theretra sugii
- Theretra sumatrensis
- Theretra sumbaensis
- Theretra tabibulensis
- Theretra tessmanni
- Theretra tibetiana
- Theretra timorensis
- Theretra tomasi
- Theretra tryoni
- Theretra turneri
- Theretra viridis
- Theretra wetanensis

=== Genus Tinostoma ===
- Tinostoma smaragditis

=== Genus Unzela ===
- Unzela japix
- Unzela pronoe

=== Genus Xylophanes ===
- Xylophanes acrus
- Xylophanes adalia
- Xylophanes aglaor
- Xylophanes alexandrei
- Xylophanes alvarezsierrai
- Xylophanes amadis
- Xylophanes anubus
- Xylophanes aristor
- Xylophanes balcazari
- Xylophanes barbuti
- Xylophanes belti
- Xylophanes bilineata
- Xylophanes blanca
- Xylophanes ceratomioides
- Xylophanes chiron
- Xylophanes clarki
- Xylophanes colinae
- Xylophanes columbiana
- Xylophanes cosmius
- Xylophanes crenulata
- Xylophanes crotonis
- Xylophanes cthulhu
- Xylophanes cyrene
- Xylophanes damocrita
- Xylophanes depuiseti
- Xylophanes docilis
- Xylophanes dolius
- Xylophanes elara
- Xylophanes epaphus
- Xylophanes eumedon
- Xylophanes falco
- Xylophanes fassli
- Xylophanes fernandezi
- Xylophanes ferotinus
- Xylophanes fosteri
- Xylophanes furtadoi
- Xylophanes fusimacula
- Xylophanes germen
- Xylophanes godmani
- Xylophanes guianensis
- Xylophanes gundlachii
- Xylophanes hannemanni
- Xylophanes haxairei
- Xylophanes huloti
- Xylophanes hydrata
- Xylophanes indistincta
- Xylophanes irrorata
- Xylophanes isaon
- Xylophanes jamaicensis
- Xylophanes jordani
- Xylophanes josephinae
- Xylophanes juanita
- Xylophanes kaempferi
- Xylophanes katharinae
- Xylophanes kiefferi
- Xylophanes lamontagnei
- Xylophanes letiranti
- Xylophanes libya
- Xylophanes lichyi
- Xylophanes lissyi
- Xylophanes loelia
- Xylophanes lolita
- Xylophanes macasensis
- Xylophanes maculator
- Xylophanes marginalis
- Xylophanes media
- Xylophanes meridanus
- Xylophanes mineti
- Xylophanes mirabilis
- Xylophanes monzoni
- Xylophanes mossi
- Xylophanes mulleri
- Xylophanes nabuchodonosor
- Xylophanes neoptolemus
- Xylophanes norfolki
- Xylophanes obscurus
- Xylophanes ockendeni
- Xylophanes pearsoni
- Xylophanes pistacina
- Xylophanes ploetzi
- Xylophanes pluto
- Xylophanes porcus
- Xylophanes porioni
- Xylophanes pyrrhus
- Xylophanes resta
- Xylophanes rhodina
- Xylophanes rhodocera
- Xylophanes rhodochlora
- Xylophanes rhodotus
- Xylophanes robinsonii
- Xylophanes rothschildi
- Xylophanes rufescens
- Xylophanes sarae
- Xylophanes schausi
- Xylophanes schreiteri
- Xylophanes schwartzi
- Xylophanes staudingeri
- Xylophanes suana
- Xylophanes tersa
- Xylophanes thyelia
- Xylophanes titana
- Xylophanes turbata
- Xylophanes tyndarus
- Xylophanes undata
- Xylophanes vagliai
- Xylophanes virescens
- Xylophanes xylobotes
- Xylophanes zurcheri

== Subfamily Smerinthinae ==
=== Genus Acanthosphinx ===
- Acanthosphinx guessfeldti

=== Genus Adhemarius ===
- Adhemarius blanchardorum
- Adhemarius daphne
- Adhemarius dariensis
- Adhemarius dentoni
- Adhemarius donysa
- Adhemarius eurysthenes
- Adhemarius fulvescens
- Adhemarius gagarini
- Adhemarius gannascus
- Adhemarius globifer
- Adhemarius jamaicensis
- Adhemarius mexicanus
- Adhemarius palmeri
- Adhemarius roessleri
- Adhemarius sexoculata
- Adhemarius tigrina
- Adhemarius ypsilon

=== Genus Afroclanis ===
- Afroclanis calcareus
- Afroclanis neavi

=== Genus Afrosataspes ===
- Afrosataspes galleyi

=== Genus Afrosphinx ===
- Afrosphinx amabilis

=== Genus Agnosia ===
- Agnosia microta
- Agnosia orneus

=== Genus Akbesia ===
- Akbesia davidi

=== Genus Ambulyx ===
- Ambulyx adhemariusa
- Ambulyx amara
- Ambulyx amboynensis
- Ambulyx andangi
- Ambulyx auripennis
- Ambulyx bakeri
- Ambulyx belli
- Ambulyx bhutana
- Ambulyx bima
- Ambulyx canescens
- Ambulyx carycina
- Ambulyx celebensis
- Ambulyx ceramensis
- Ambulyx charlesi
- Ambulyx clavata
- Ambulyx cyclasticta
- Ambulyx dohertyi
- Ambulyx flava
- Ambulyx flavocelebensis
- Ambulyx immaculata
- Ambulyx inouei
- Ambulyx interplacida
- Ambulyx japonica
- Ambulyx johnsoni
- Ambulyx jordani
- Ambulyx kuangtungensis
- Ambulyx lahora
- Ambulyx latifascia
- Ambulyx lestradei
- Ambulyx liturata
- Ambulyx maculifera
- Ambulyx marissa
- Ambulyx matti
- Ambulyx meeki
- Ambulyx montana
- Ambulyx moorei
- Ambulyx naessigi
- Ambulyx obliterata
- Ambulyx ochracea
- Ambulyx phalaris
- Ambulyx placida
- Ambulyx pryeri
- Ambulyx pseudoclavata
- Ambulyx pseudoregia
- Ambulyx rawlinsi
- Ambulyx regia
- Ambulyx rudloffi
- Ambulyx schauffelbergeri
- Ambulyx semifervens
- Ambulyx semiplacida
- Ambulyx sericeipennis
- Ambulyx siamensis
- Ambulyx sinjaevi
- Ambulyx staudingeri
- Ambulyx substrigilis
- Ambulyx suluensis
- Ambulyx tattina
- Ambulyx tenimberi
- Ambulyx tobii
- Ambulyx tondanoi
- Ambulyx viteki
- Ambulyx wildei
- Ambulyx wilemani
- Ambulyx zacharovi
- Ambulyx zhejiangensis

=== Genus Amorpha ===
- Amorpha juglandis

=== Genus Amplypterus ===
- Amplypterus celebensis
- Amplypterus mansoni
- Amplypterus mindanaoensis
- Amplypterus panopus
- Amplypterus sumbawanensis

=== Genus Anambulyx ===
- Anambulyx elwesi

=== Genus Andriasa ===
- Andriasa contraria
- Andriasa mitchelli

=== Genus Avinoffia ===
- Avinoffia hollandi

=== Genus Batocnema ===
- Batocnema africanus
- Batocnema coquerelii

=== Genus Cadiouclanis ===
- Cadiouclanis bianchii

=== Genus Callambulyx ===
- Callambulyx amanda
- Callambulyx junonia
- Callambulyx kitchingi
- Callambulyx poecilus
- Callambulyx rubricosa
- Callambulyx schintlmeisteri
- Callambulyx sichangensis
- Callambulyx sinjaevi
- Callambulyx tatarinovii

=== Genus Ceridia ===
- Ceridia heuglini
- Ceridia mira
- Ceridia nigricans

=== Genus Chloroclanis ===
- Chloroclanis virescens

=== Genus Clanidopsis ===
- Clanidopsis exusta

=== Genus Clanis ===
- Clanis baratana
- Clanis bilineata
- Clanis deucalion
- Clanis euroa
- Clanis hyperion
- Clanis mahadeva
- Clanis mcguirei
- Clanis negritensis
- Clanis orhanti
- Clanis peterseni
- Clanis phalaris
- Clanis pratti
- Clanis schwartzi
- Clanis stenosema
- Clanis surigaoensis
- Clanis thailandica
- Clanis titan
- Clanis undulosa

=== Genus Coenotes ===
- Coenotes eremophilae
- Coenotes jakli

=== Genus Coequosa ===
- Coequosa australasiae
- Coequosa triangularis

=== Genus Compsulyx ===
- Compsulyx cochereaui

=== Genus Craspedortha ===
- Craspedortha porphyria
- Craspedortha montana

=== Genus Cypa ===
- Cypa bouyeri
- Cypa claggi
- Cypa decolor
- Cypa duponti
- Cypa enodis
- Cypa ferruginea
- Cypa kitchingi
- Cypa latericia
- Cypa luzonica
- Cypa terranea
- Cypa uniformis

=== Genus Cypoides ===
- Cypoides chinensis
- Cypoides parachinensis

=== Genus Daphnusa ===
- Daphnusa ailanti
- Daphnusa ocellaris
- Daphnusa philippinensis
- Daphnusa sinocontinentalis
- Daphnusa zythum

=== Genus Dargeclanis ===
- Dargeclanis grandidieri

=== Genus Degmaptera ===
- Degmaptera cadioui
- Degmaptera mirabilis
- Degmaptera olivacea

=== Genus Dolbina ===
- Dolbina borneensis
- Dolbina elegans
- Dolbina exacta
- Dolbina formosana
- Dolbina grisea
- Dolbina inexacta
- Dolbina krikkeni
- Dolbina luzonensis
- Dolbina mindanaensis
- Dolbina paraexacta
- Dolbina schnitzleri
- Dolbina tancrei

=== Genus Falcatula ===
- Falcatula cymatodes
- Falcatula falcatus
- Falcatula penumbra
- Falcatula svaricki
- Falcatula tamsi

=== Genus Grillotius ===
- Grillotius bergeri

=== Genus Gynoeryx ===
- Gynoeryx bilineatus
- Gynoeryx brevis
- Gynoeryx integer
- Gynoeryx meander
- Gynoeryx paulianii
- Gynoeryx teteforti

=== Genus Hopliocnema ===
- Hopliocnema brachycera

=== Genus Imber ===
- Imber tropicus

=== Genus Kentrochrysalis ===
- Kentrochrysalis consimilis
- Kentrochrysalis heberti
- Kentrochrysalis sieversi
- Kentrochrysalis streckeri

=== Genus Langia ===
- Langia zenzeroides

=== Genus Laothoe ===
- Laothoe amurensis
- Laothoe austanti
- Laothoe habeli
- Laothoe philerema
- Laothoe populeti
- Laothoe populetorum
- Laothoe populi

=== Genus Larunda ===
- Larunda molitor

=== Genus Leptoclanis ===
- Leptoclanis pulchra

=== Genus Leucophlebia ===
- Leucophlebia afra
- Leucophlebia caecilie
- Leucophlebia edentata
- Leucophlebia emittens
- Leucophlebia formosana
- Leucophlebia frederkingi
- Leucophlebia hogenesi
- Leucophlebia lineata
- Leucophlebia muehlei
- Leucophlebia neumanni
- Leucophlebia paul
- Leucophlebia pinratanai
- Leucophlebia rosacea
- Leucophlebia schachti
- Leucophlebia vietnamensis
- Leucophlebia xanthopis

=== Genus Likoma ===
- Likoma apicalis
- Likoma crenata

=== Genus Lophostethus ===
- Lophostethus dumolinii
- Lophostethus negus

=== Genus Lycosphingia ===
- Lycosphingia hamatus

=== Genus Malgassoclanis ===
- Malgassoclanis delicatus
- Malgassoclanis suffuscus

=== Genus Marumba ===
- Marumba amboinicus
- Marumba cristata
- Marumba diehli
- Marumba dyras
- Marumba fenzelii
- Marumba gaschkewitschii
- Marumba indicus
- Marumba jankowskii
- Marumba juvencus
- Marumba maackii
- Marumba nympha
- Marumba poliotis
- Marumba quercus
- Marumba saishiuana
- Marumba spectabilis
- Marumba sperchius
- Marumba tigrina
- Marumba timora

=== Genus Microclanis ===
- Microclanis erlangeri

=== Genus Mimas ===
- Mimas christophi
- Mimas tiliae

=== Genus Monarda ===
- Monarda oryx

=== Genus Morwennius ===
- Morwennius decoratus

=== Genus Neoclanis ===
- Neoclanis basalis

=== Genus Neopolyptychus ===
- Neopolyptychus ancylus
- Neopolyptychus centralis
- Neopolyptychus choveti
- Neopolyptychus compar
- Neopolyptychus consimilis
- Neopolyptychus convexus
- Neopolyptychus prionites
- Neopolyptychus pygarga
- Neopolyptychus serrator
- Neopolyptychus spurrelli

=== Genus Opistoclanis ===
- Opistoclanis hawkeri

=== Genus Oplerclanis ===
- Oplerclanis boisduvali
- Oplerclanis rhadamistus

=== Genus Orecta ===
- Orecta acuminata
- Orecta fruhstorferi
- Orecta lycidas
- Orecta venedictoffae

=== Genus Pachysphinx ===
- Pachysphinx modesta
- Pachysphinx occidentalis
- Pachysphinx peninsularis

=== Genus Paonias ===
- Paonias astylus
- Paonias excaecatus
- Paonias macrops
- Paonias myops
- Paonias wolfei

=== Genus Parum ===
- Parum colligata

=== Genus Pentateucha ===
- Pentateucha curiosa
- Pentateucha inouei
- Pentateucha stueningi

=== Genus Phyllosphingia ===
- Phyllosphingia dissimilis

=== Genus Phylloxiphia ===
- Phylloxiphia goodii
- Phylloxiphia bicolor
- Phylloxiphia formosa
- Phylloxiphia illustris
- Phylloxiphia karschi
- Phylloxiphia metria
- Phylloxiphia oberthueri
- Phylloxiphia oweni
- Phylloxiphia punctum
- Phylloxiphia vicina

=== Genus Pierreclanis ===
- Pierreclanis admatha

=== Genus Platysphinx ===
- Platysphinx bouyeri
- Platysphinx constrigilis
- Platysphinx dorsti
- Platysphinx phyllis
- Platysphinx piabilis
- Platysphinx stigmatica
- Platysphinx vicaria
- Platysphinx zabolichus

=== Genus Poliodes ===
- Poliodes roseicornis

=== Genus Polyptychoides ===
- Polyptychoides afarissaque
- Polyptychoides assimilis
- Polyptychoides cadioui
- Polyptychoides digitatus
- Polyptychoides erosus
- Polyptychoides grayii
- Polyptychoides insulanus
- Polyptychoides mbarikensis
- Polyptychoides niloticus
- Polyptychoides obtusus
- Polyptychoides politzari
- Polyptychoides ruaha
- Polyptychoides septentrionalis
- Polyptychoides vuattouxi

=== Genus Polyptychopsis ===
- Polyptychopsis marshalli

=== Genus Polyptychus ===
- Polyptychus affinis
- Polyptychus andosa
- Polyptychus anochus
- Polyptychus aurora
- Polyptychus baltus
- Polyptychus baxteri
- Polyptychus bernardii
- Polyptychus carteri
- Polyptychus chinensis
- Polyptychus claudiae
- Polyptychus coryndoni
- Polyptychus dentatus
- Polyptychus distensus
- Polyptychus enodia
- Polyptychus girardi
- Polyptychus herbuloti
- Polyptychus hollandi
- Polyptychus lapidatus
- Polyptychus murinus
- Polyptychus nigriplaga
- Polyptychus orthographus
- Polyptychus paupercula
- Polyptychus potiendus
- Polyptychus rougeoti
- Polyptychus sinus
- Polyptychus thihongae
- Polyptychus trilineatus
- Polyptychus trisecta
- Polyptychus wojtusiaki

=== Genus Protambulyx ===
- Protambulyx astygonus
- Protambulyx carteri
- Protambulyx euryalus
- Protambulyx eurycles
- Protambulyx goeldii
- Protambulyx ockendeni
- Protambulyx strigilis
- Protambulyx sulphurea

=== Genus Pseudandriasa ===
- Pseudandriasa mutata

=== Genus Pseudoclanis ===
- Pseudoclanis abyssinicus
- Pseudoclanis aequabilis
- Pseudoclanis axis
- Pseudoclanis biokoensis
- Pseudoclanis canui
- Pseudoclanis diana
- Pseudoclanis evestigata
- Pseudoclanis kakamegae
- Pseudoclanis kenyae
- Pseudoclanis occidentalis
- Pseudoclanis postica
- Pseudoclanis somaliae
- Pseudoclanis tomensis
- Pseudoclanis zairensis

=== Genus Pseudopolyptychus ===
- Pseudopolyptychus foliaceus

=== Genus Rhadinopasa ===
- Rhadinopasa hornimani

=== Genus Rhodambulyx ===
- Rhodambulyx davidi
- Rhodambulyx hainanensis
- Rhodambulyx schnitzleri

=== Genus Rhodoprasina ===
- Rhodoprasina callantha
- Rhodoprasina corolla
- Rhodoprasina corrigenda
- Rhodoprasina floralis
- Rhodoprasina koerferi
- Rhodoprasina mateji
- Rhodoprasina nanlingensis
- Rhodoprasina nenulfascia
- Rhodoprasina viksinjaevi
- Rhodoprasina winbrechlini

=== Genus Rufoclanis ===
- Rufoclanis erlangeri
- Rufoclanis fulgurans
- Rufoclanis jansei
- Rufoclanis maccleeryi
- Rufoclanis numosae
- Rufoclanis rosea

=== Genus Sataspes ===
- Sataspes cerberus
- Sataspes infernalis
- Sataspes javanica
- Sataspes leyteana
- Sataspes negrosiana
- Sataspes ribbei
- Sataspes scotti
- Sataspes tagalica
- Sataspes xylocoparis

=== Genus Smerinthulus ===
- Smerinthulus designata
- Smerinthulus diehli
- Smerinthulus dohrni
- Smerinthulus myanmarensis
- Smerinthulus perversa
- Smerinthulus quadripunctatus
- Smerinthulus witti

=== Genus Smerinthus ===
- Smerinthus caecus
- Smerinthus cerisyi
- Smerinthus jamaicensis
- Smerinthus kindermannii
- Smerinthus minor
- Smerinthus ocellatus
- Smerinthus ophthalmica
- Smerinthus planus
- Smerinthus saliceti
- Smerinthus szechuanus
- Smerinthus tokyonis
- Smerinthus visinskasi

=== Genus Sphingulus ===
- Sphingulus mus

=== Genus Synoecha ===
- Synoecha marmorata

=== Genus Tetrachroa ===
- Tetrachroa edwardsi

=== Genus Trogolegnum ===
- Trogolegnum pseudambulyx

=== Genus Viriclanis ===
- Viriclanis kingstoni

=== Genus Xenosphingia ===
- Xenosphingia jansei

== Subfamily Sphinginae ==
=== Genus Acherontia ===
- Acherontia atropos
- Acherontia styx
- Acherontia lachesis

=== Genus Adhemarius ===
- Adhemarius blanchardorum
- Adhemarius daphne
- Adhemarius dariensis
- Adhemarius dentoni
- Adhemarius donysa
- Adhemarius eurysthenes
- Adhemarius fulvescens
- Adhemarius gagarini
- Adhemarius gannascus
- Adhemarius globifer
- Adhemarius jamaicensis
- Adhemarius mexicanus
- Adhemarius palmeri
- Adhemarius roessleri
- Adhemarius sexoculata
- Adhemarius tigrina
- Adhemarius ypsilon

=== Genus Agrius ===
- Agrius cingulata
- Agrius convolvuli
- Agrius cordiae
- Agrius godarti
- Agrius luctifera
- Agrius rothschildi

=== Genus Amphimoea ===
- Amphimoea walkeri

=== Genus Amphonyx ===
- Amphonyx duponchel
- Amphonyx haxairei
- Amphonyx jamaicensis
- Amphonyx kofleri
- Amphonyx lucifer
- Amphonyx mephisto
- Amphonyx rivularis
- Amphonyx vitrinus

=== Genus Apocalypsis ===
- Apocalypsis velox

=== Genus Callosphingia ===
- Callosphingia circe

=== Genus Ceratomia ===
- Ceratomia amyntor
- Ceratomia catalpae
- Ceratomia hageni
- Ceratomia hoffmanni
- Ceratomia igualana
- Ceratomia sonorensis
- Ceratomia undulosa

=== Genus Cocytius ===
- Cocytius antaeus

=== Genus Coelonia ===
- Coelonia brevis
- Coelonia fulvinotata
- Coelonia solani

=== Genus Dolba ===
- Dolba hyloeus

=== Genus Dolbogene ===
- Dolbogene hartwegii

=== Genus Dovania ===
- Dovania dargei
- Dovania mirei
- Dovania neumanni
- Dovania poecila

=== Genus Ellenbeckia ===
- Ellenbeckia monospila

=== Genus Euryglottis ===
- Euryglottis albostigmata
- Euryglottis aper
- Euryglottis davidianus
- Euryglottis dognini
- Euryglottis guttiventris
- Euryglottis johannes
- Euryglottis oliver

=== Genus Hoplistopus ===
- Hoplistopus butti
- Hoplistopus penricei

=== Genus Isoparce ===
- Isoparce broui
- Isoparce cupressi

=== Genus Lapara ===
- Lapara bombycoides
- Lapara coniferarum
- Lapara halicarnie
- Lapara phaeobrachycerous

=== Genus Leucomonia ===
- Leucomonia bethia

=== Genus Lintneria ===
- Lintneria arthuri
- Lintneria aurigutta
- Lintneria balsae
- Lintneria biolleyi
- Lintneria eremitoides
- Lintneria eremitus
- Lintneria geminus
- Lintneria istar
- Lintneria justiciae
- Lintneria lugens
- Lintneria maura
- Lintneria merops
- Lintneria phalerata
- Lintneria pitzahuac
- Lintneria porioni
- Lintneria praelongus
- Lintneria pseudostigmatica
- Lintneria separatus
- Lintneria smithi
- Lintneria tricolor
- Lintneria xantus

=== Genus Litosphingia ===
- Litosphingia corticea
- Litosphingia minettii

=== Genus Lomocyma ===
- Lomocyma oegrapha

=== Genus Macropoliana ===
- Macropoliana afarorum
- Macropoliana asirensis
- Macropoliana cadioui
- Macropoliana ferax
- Macropoliana gessi
- Macropoliana natalensis
- Macropoliana scheveni

=== Genus Manduca ===
- Manduca afflicta
- Manduca albiplaga
- Manduca albolineata
- Manduca andicola
- Manduca armatipes
- Manduca aztecus
- Manduca barnesi
- Manduca bergarmatipes
- Manduca bergi
- Manduca blackburni
- Manduca boliviana
- Manduca brasilensis
- Manduca brontes
- Manduca brunalba
- Manduca camposi
- Manduca caribbeus
- Manduca chinchilla
- Manduca clarki
- Manduca contracta
- Manduca corallina
- Manduca corumbensis
- Manduca dalica
- Manduca diffissa
- Manduca dilucida
- Manduca duquefi
- Manduca empusa
- Manduca extrema
- Manduca feronia
- Manduca florestan
- Manduca fosteri
- Manduca franciscae
- Manduca gloriosa
- Manduca gueneei
- Manduca hannibal
- Manduca huascara
- Manduca incisa
- Manduca janira
- Manduca jasminearum
- Manduca johanni
- Manduca jordani
- Manduca kuschei
- Manduca lamasi
- Manduca lanuginosa
- Manduca lefeburii
- Manduca leucospila
- Manduca lichenea
- Manduca lucetius
- Manduca manducoides
- Manduca morelia
- Manduca mossi
- Manduca muscosa
- Manduca neglecta
- Manduca occulta
- Manduca ochus
- Manduca pellenia
- Manduca prestoni
- Manduca quinquemaculata
- Manduca reducta
- Manduca rustica
- Manduca schausi
- Manduca scutata
- Manduca sesquiplex
- Manduca sexta
- Manduca stuarti
- Manduca trimacula
- Manduca tucumana
- Manduca undata
- Manduca vestalis
- Manduca violaalba
- Manduca wellingi

=== Genus Megacorma ===
- Megacorma hoffmani
- Megacorma iorioi
- Megacorma obliqua
- Megacorma remota
- Megacorma schroederi

=== Genus Meganoton ===
- Meganoton analis
- Meganoton hyloicoides
- Meganoton loeffleri
- Meganoton nyctiphanes
- Meganoton rubescens
- Meganoton yunnanfuana

=== Genus Morcocytius ===
- Morcocytius mortuorum

=== Genus Nannoparce ===
- Nannoparce balsa
- Nannoparce poeyi

=== Genus Neococytius ===
- Neococytius cluentius

=== Genus Neogene ===
- Neogene albescens
- Neogene carrerasi
- Neogene corumbensis
- Neogene curitiba
- Neogene dynaeus
- Neogene intermedia
- Neogene pictus
- Neogene reevei
- Neogene steinbachi

=== Genus Oligographa ===
- Oligographa juniperi

=== Genus Panogena ===
- Panogena jasmini
- Panogena lingens

=== Genus Pantophaea ===
- Pantophaea favillacea
- Pantophaea jordani
- Pantophaea oneili

=== Genus Paratrea ===
- Paratrea plebeja

=== Genus Poliana ===
- Poliana albescens
- Poliana buchholzi
- Poliana leucomelas
- Poliana micra
- Poliana wintgensi

=== Genus Praedora ===
- Praedora leucophaea
- Praedora marshalli
- Praedora plagiata
- Praedora puchneri
- Praedora tropicalis

=== Genus Pseudococytius ===
- Pseudococytius beelzebuth

=== Genus Pseudodolbina ===
- Pseudodolbina aequalis
- Pseudodolbina fo

=== Genus Psilogramma ===
- Psilogramma andamanica
- Psilogramma angelika
- Psilogramma anne
- Psilogramma argos
- Psilogramma bartschereri
- Psilogramma baueri
- Psilogramma casuarinae
- Psilogramma choui
- Psilogramma danneri
- Psilogramma dantchenkoi
- Psilogramma dillerorum
- Psilogramma discistriga
- Psilogramma edii
- Psilogramma exigua
- Psilogramma floresica
- Psilogramma frankenbachi
- Psilogramma gerstmeieri
- Psilogramma gloriosa
- Psilogramma hainanensis
- Psilogramma hauensteini
- Psilogramma hayati
- Psilogramma increta
- Psilogramma japonica
- Psilogramma joachimi
- Psilogramma jordana
- Psilogramma kitchingi
- Psilogramma kleineri
- Psilogramma koalae
- Psilogramma lifuense
- Psilogramma lukhtanovi
- Psilogramma macromera
- Psilogramma makirae
- Psilogramma mandarina
- Psilogramma manusensis
- Psilogramma maxmouldsi
- Psilogramma medicieloi
- Psilogramma menephron
- Psilogramma monastyrskii
- Psilogramma nebulosa
- Psilogramma orientalis
- Psilogramma papuensis
- Psilogramma paukstadtorum
- Psilogramma penumbra
- Psilogramma reinhardti
- Psilogramma renneri
- Psilogramma rupprechtorum
- Psilogramma salomonis
- Psilogramma stameri
- Psilogramma sulawesica
- Psilogramma sundana
- Psilogramma surholti
- Psilogramma tanimbarica
- Psilogramma timorica
- Psilogramma ulrichroesleri
- Psilogramma vanuatui
- Psilogramma vates
- Psilogramma villani
- Psilogramma wannanensis
- Psilogramma wernerbacki
- Psilogramma wetarensis
- Psilogramma yilingae

=== Genus Sagenosoma ===
- Sagenosoma elsa

=== Genus Sphingidites ===
- Sphingidites weidneri

=== Genus Sphinx ===
- Sphinx adumbrata
- Sphinx asellus
- Sphinx caligineus
- Sphinx canadensis
- Sphinx centrosinaria
- Sphinx chersis
- Sphinx chisoya
- Sphinx constricta
- Sphinx crassistriga
- Sphinx dollii
- Sphinx drupiferarum
- Sphinx formosana
- Sphinx franckii
- Sphinx gordius
- Sphinx kalmiae
- Sphinx leucophaeata
- Sphinx libocedrus
- Sphinx ligustri
- Sphinx luscitiosa
- Sphinx maurorum
- Sphinx morio
- Sphinx nogueirai
- Sphinx oberthueri
- Sphinx perelegans
- Sphinx pinastri
- Sphinx poecila
- Sphinx sequoiae
- Sphinx vashti

=== Genus Thamnoecha ===
- Thamnoecha uniformis

=== Genus Xanthopan ===
- Xanthopan morganii
