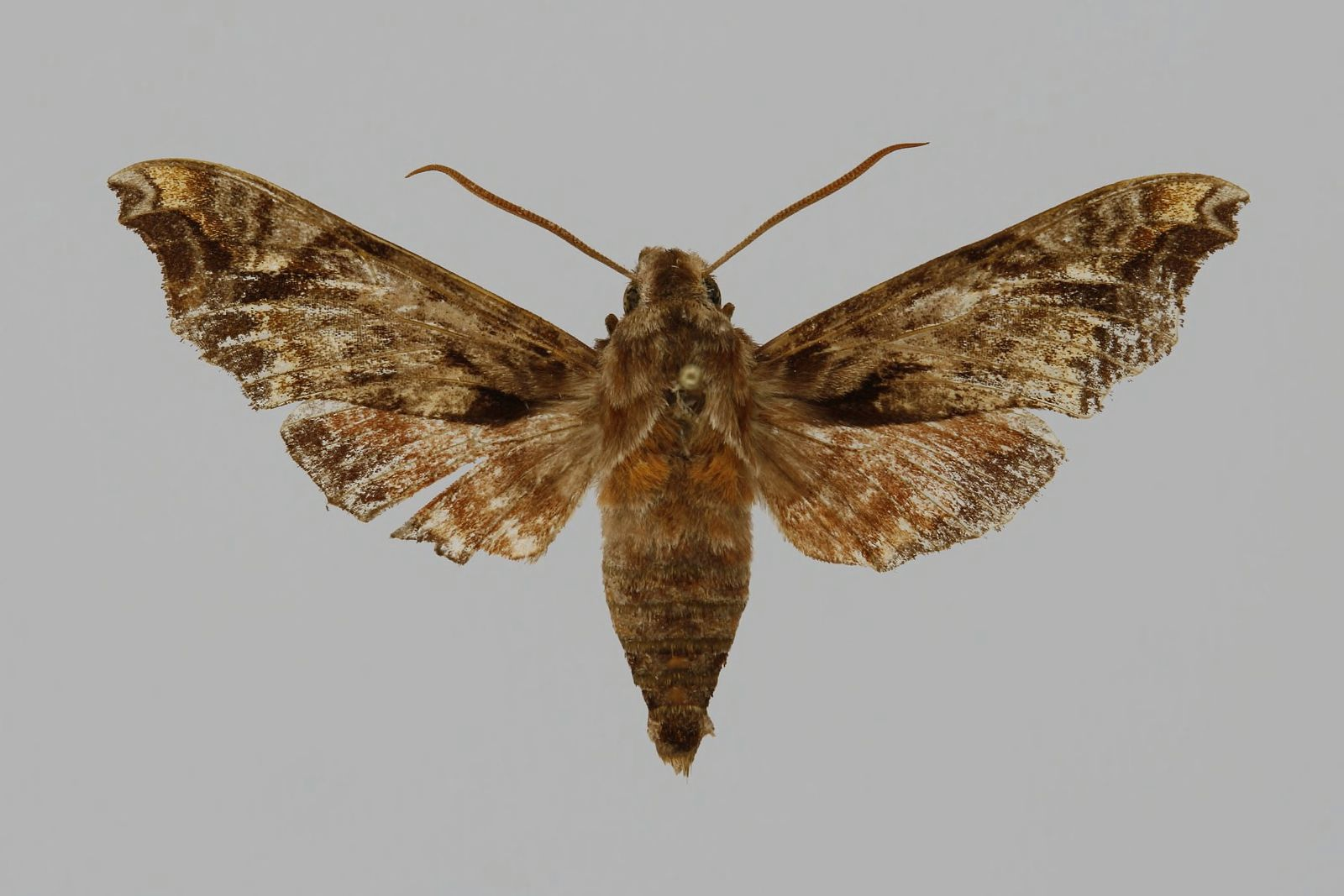
- Male

Scientific classification
- Kingdom: Animalia
- Phylum: Arthropoda
- Class: Insecta
- Order: Lepidoptera
- Family: Sphingidae
- Genus: Dahira
- Species: D. klaudiae

Binomial name
- Dahira klaudiae Brechlin, Melichar & Haxaire, 2006

= Dahira klaudiae =

Species of moth

Dahira klaudiae is a moth of the family Sphingidae which is endemic to China.

The forewing length is 27–31 millimetres (1.1–1.2 in). It is very similar to Dahira yunnanfuana but distinguishable by the reddish-brown rather than greyish-brown ground colour of the hindwing upperside.
