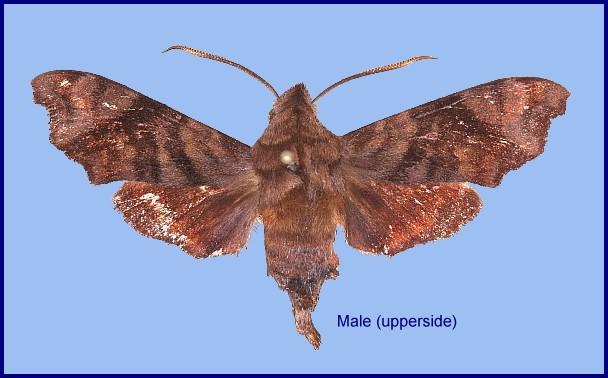

Scientific classification
- Kingdom: Animalia
- Phylum: Arthropoda
- Class: Insecta
- Order: Lepidoptera
- Family: Sphingidae
- Genus: Dahira
- Species: D. jitkae

Binomial name
- Dahira jitkae Haxaire & Melichar, 2007

= Dahira jitkae =

Species of moth

Dahira jitkae is a moth of the family Sphingidae. It is known from Sichuan in China, where it occurs at around 1,300 meters altitude.

The wingspan is about 50 mm. It is very similar to Dahira niphaphylla, but with markedly different male genitalia.
