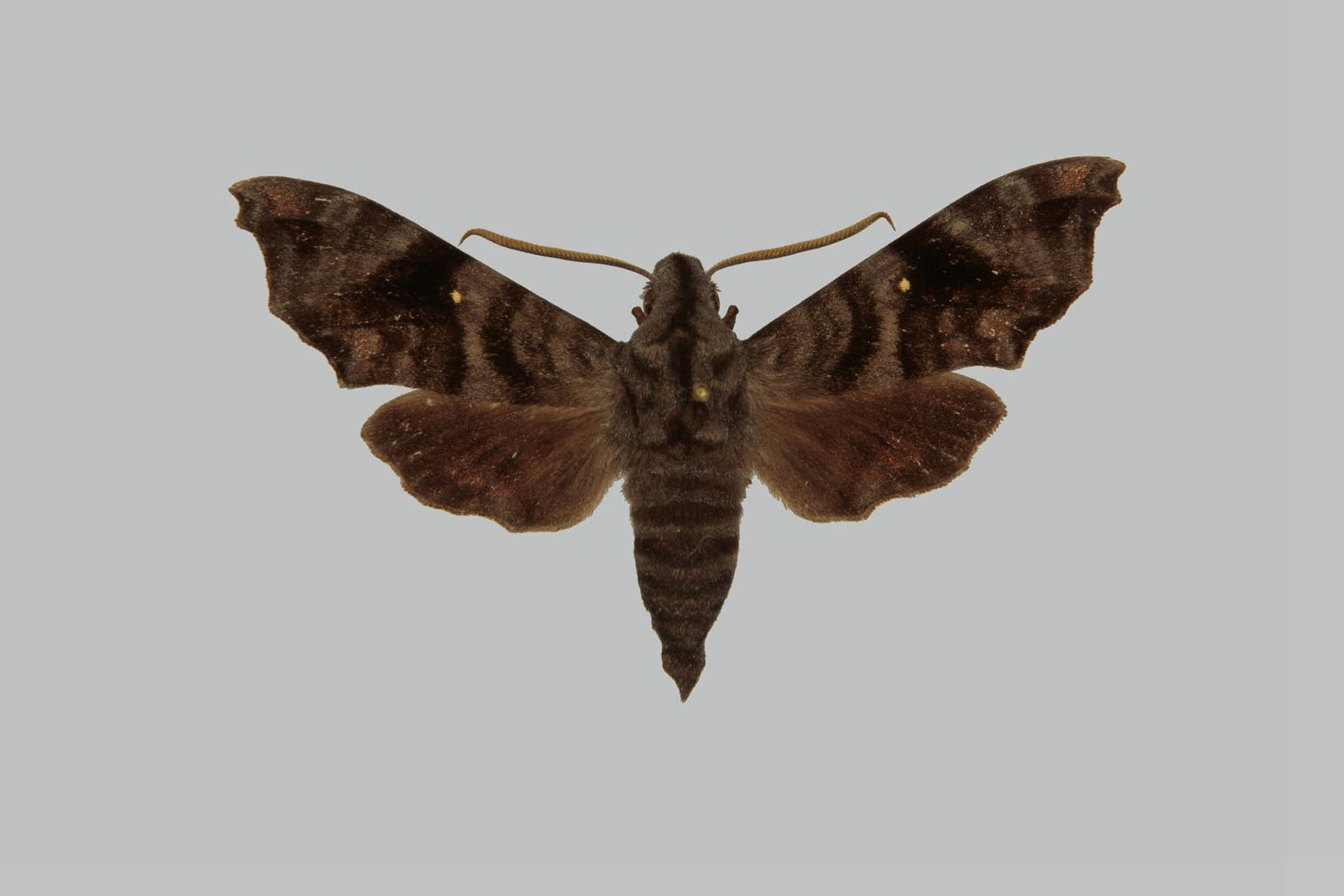
- Male

Scientific classification
- Kingdom: Animalia
- Phylum: Arthropoda
- Class: Insecta
- Order: Lepidoptera
- Family: Sphingidae
- Genus: Dahira
- Species: D. tridens

Binomial name
- Dahira tridens (Oberthür, 1904)

Synonyms
- Lepchina tridens Oberthür, 1904

= Dahira tridens =

Species of moth

Dahira tridens is a moth of the family Sphingidae. It is known from Nepal.
