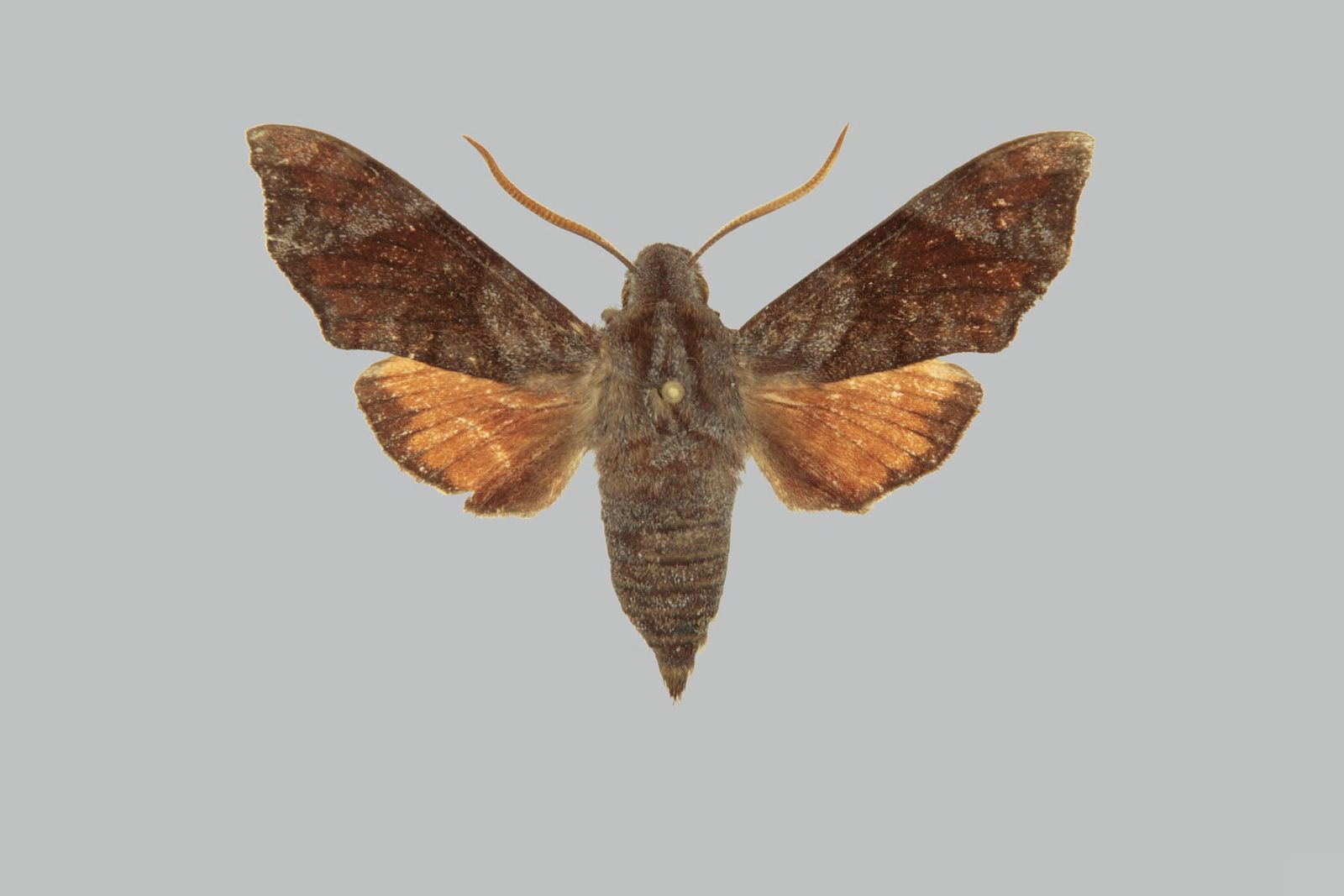
- Male

Scientific classification
- Kingdom: Animalia
- Phylum: Arthropoda
- Class: Insecta
- Order: Lepidoptera
- Family: Sphingidae
- Genus: Dahira
- Species: D. taiwana

Binomial name
- Dahira taiwana (Brechlin, 1998)

Synonyms
- Gehlenia taiwana Brechlin, 1998

= Dahira taiwana =

Species of moth

Dahira taiwana is a moth of the family Sphingidae. It is endemic to Taiwan.
