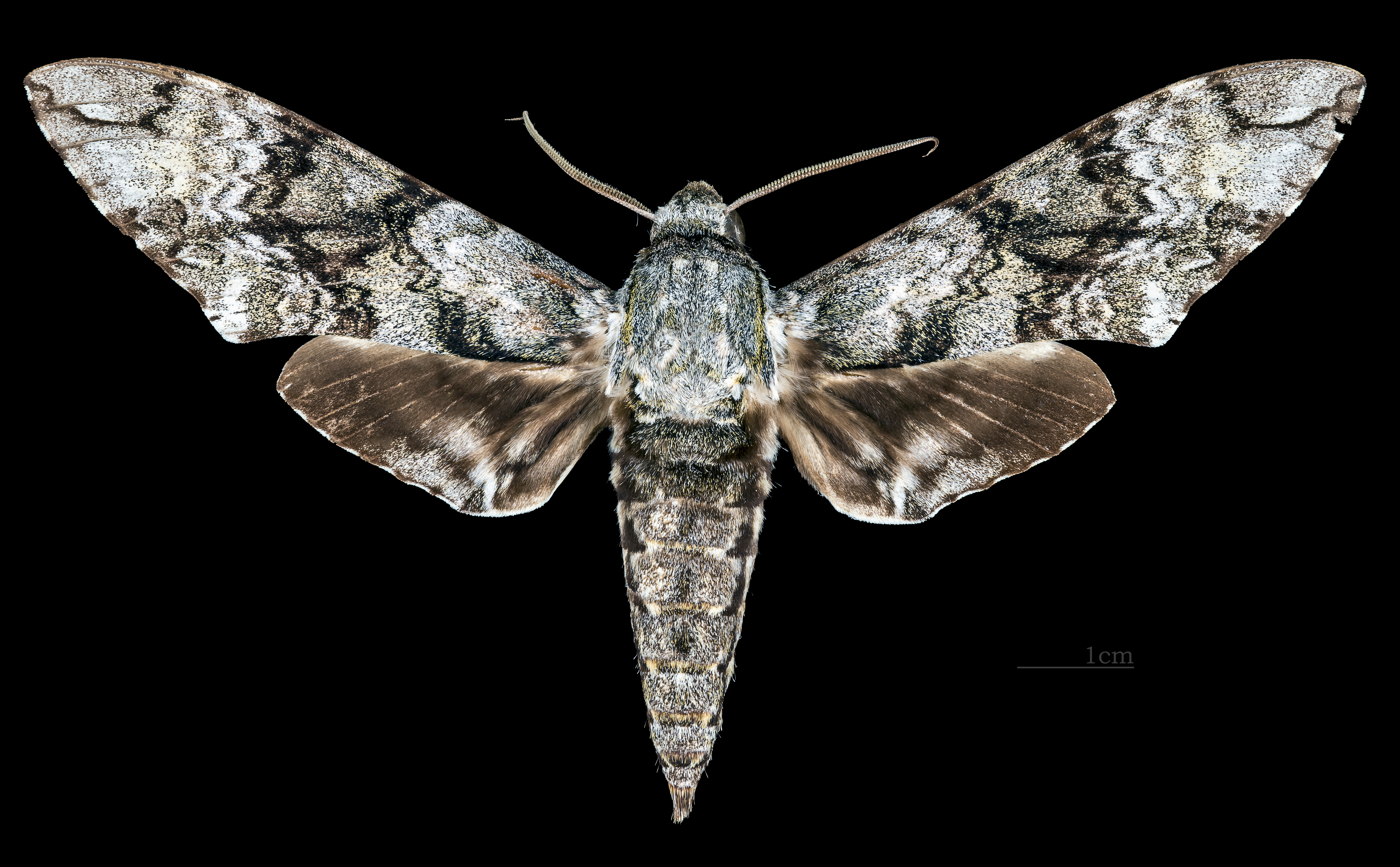
- Manduca huascara Dorsal
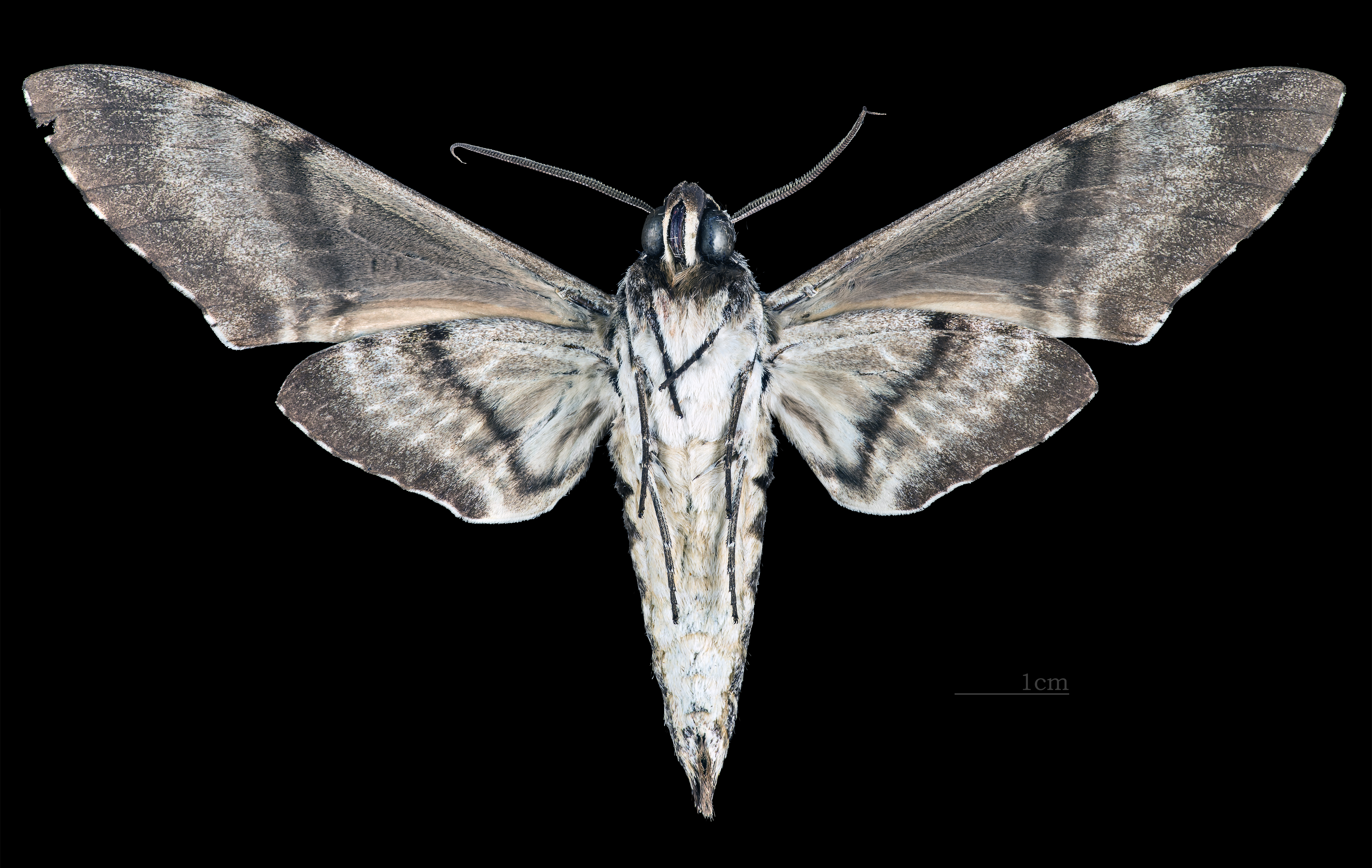
- Manduca huascara ventral

Scientific classification
- Kingdom: Animalia
- Phylum: Arthropoda
- Clade: Pancrustacea
- Class: Insecta
- Order: Lepidoptera
- Family: Sphingidae
- Genus: Manduca
- Species: M. huascara

Binomial name
- Manduca huascara (Schaus, 1941)

Synonyms
- Protoparce huascara Schaus, 1941

= Manduca huascara =

Species of moth

Manduca huascara is a moth of the family Sphingidae. It is known from Colombia.
