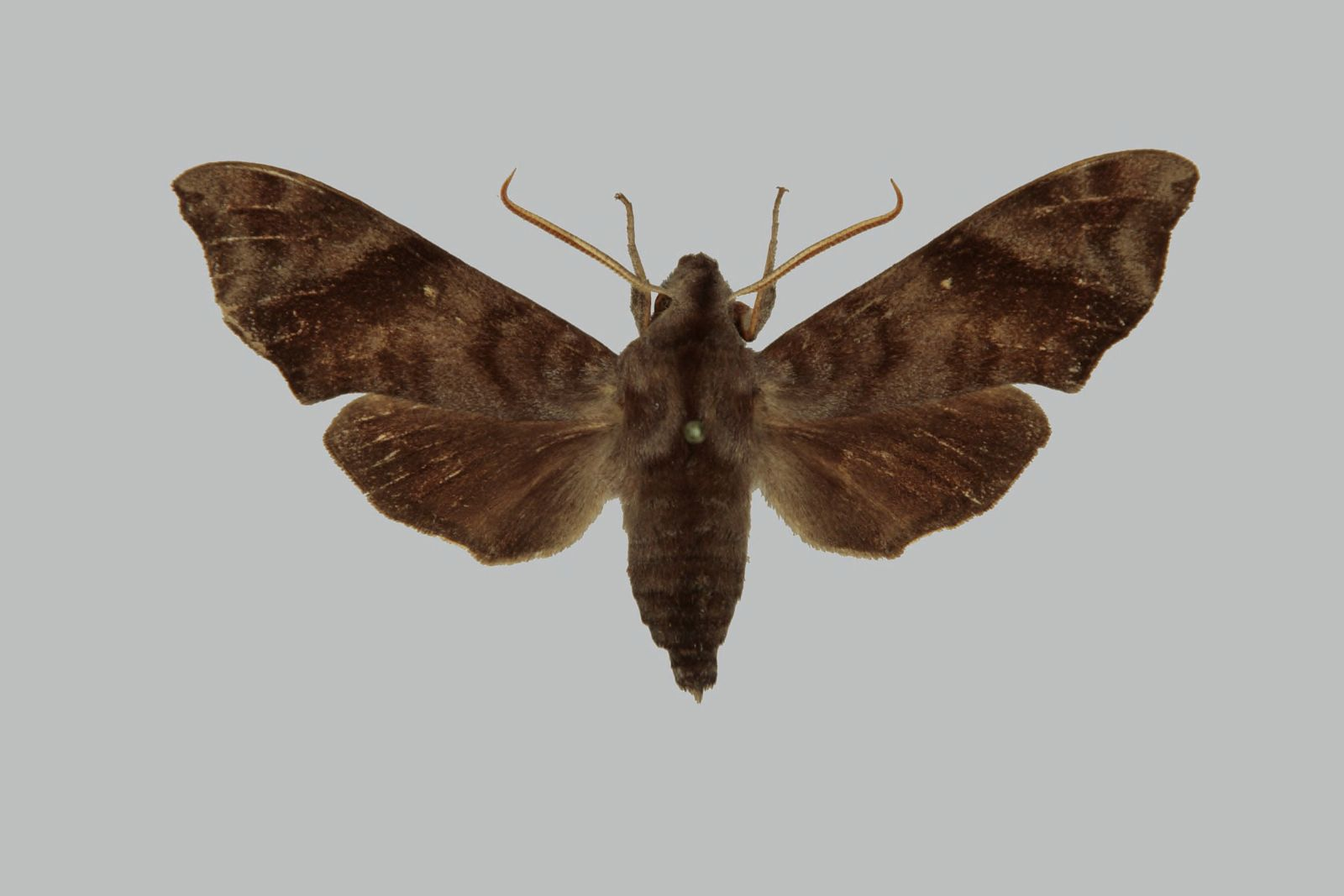
- Male

Scientific classification
- Kingdom: Animalia
- Phylum: Arthropoda
- Class: Insecta
- Order: Lepidoptera
- Family: Sphingidae
- Genus: Dahira
- Species: D. plutenkoi

Binomial name
- Dahira plutenkoi (Brechlin, 2002)

Synonyms
- Lepchina plutenkoi Brechlin, 2002

= Dahira plutenkoi =

Species of moth

Dahira plutenkoi is a moth of the family Sphingidae. It is known from Sichuan in China, where it occurs at between 2,600 and 3,200 meters altitude.
