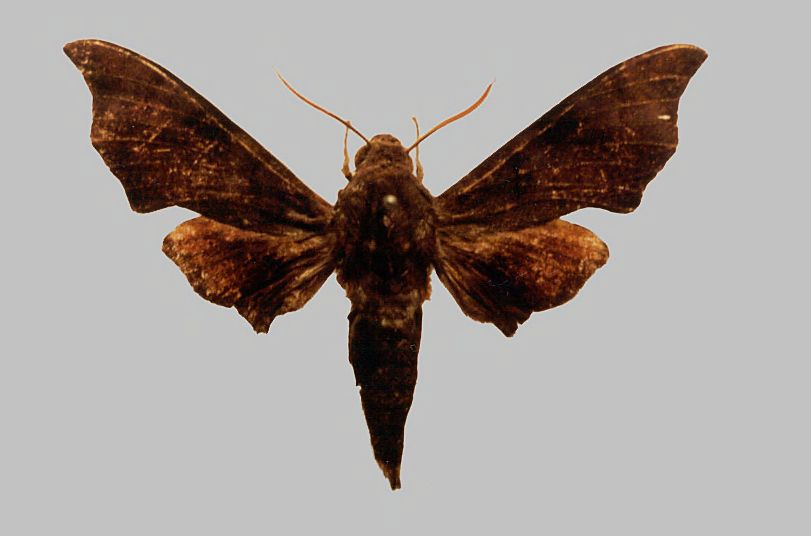

Scientific classification
- Kingdom: Animalia
- Phylum: Arthropoda
- Clade: Pancrustacea
- Class: Insecta
- Order: Lepidoptera
- Family: Sphingidae
- Genus: Dahira
- Species: D. pinratanai

Binomial name
- Dahira pinratanai (Cadiou, 1991)

Synonyms
- Gehlenia pinratanai Cadiou, 1991

= Dahira pinratanai =

Species of moth

Dahira pinratanai is a moth of the family Sphingidae. It is known from Thailand.
