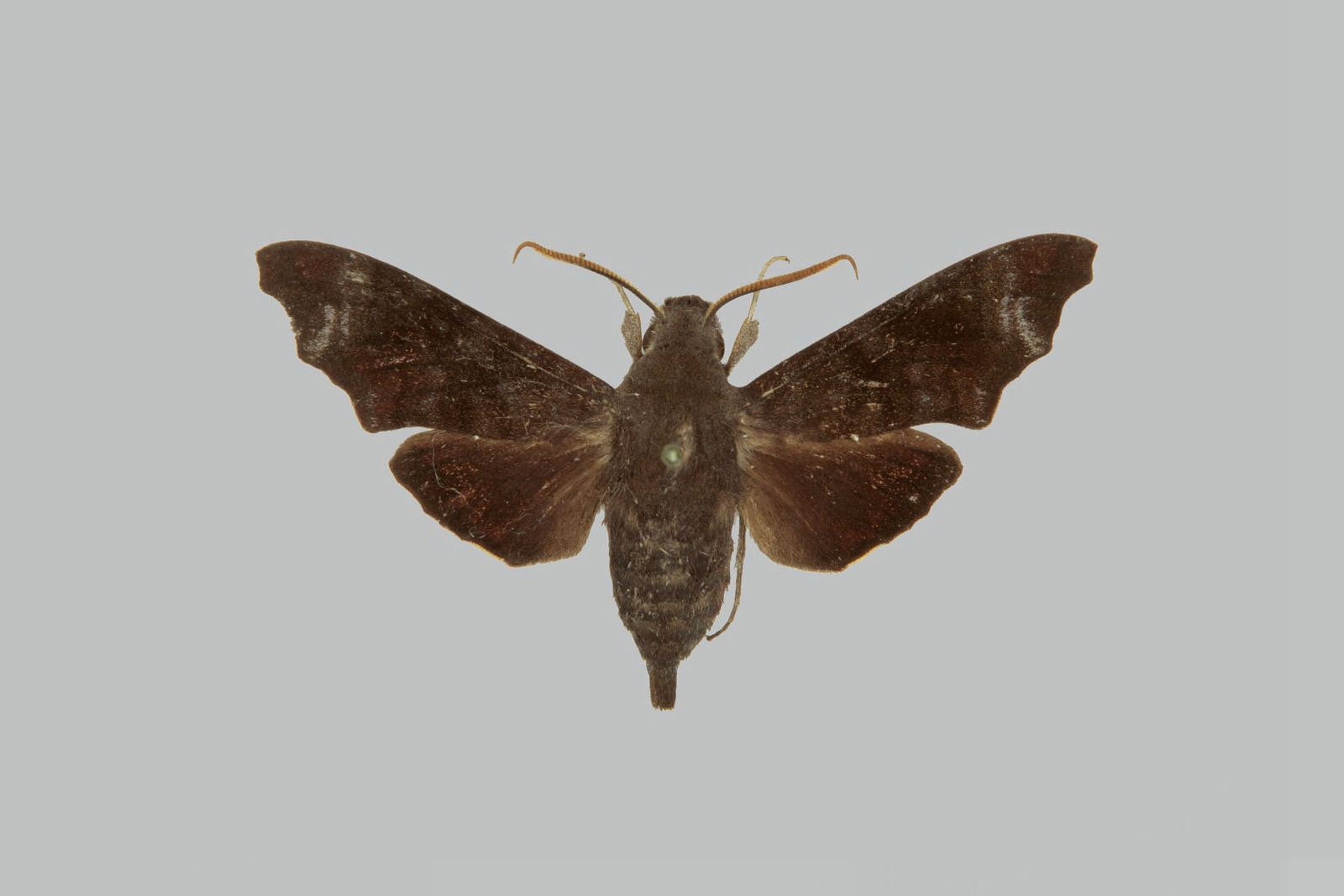
- Male

Scientific classification
- Kingdom: Animalia
- Phylum: Arthropoda
- Class: Insecta
- Order: Lepidoptera
- Family: Sphingidae
- Genus: Dahira
- Species: D. viksinjaevi

Binomial name
- Dahira viksinjaevi Brechlin, 2006

= Dahira viksinjaevi =

Species of moth

Dahira viksinjaevi is a moth of the family Sphingidae which is known from China.
