= Dahira uljanae =

Scientific classification
- Kingdom: Animalia
- Phylum: Arthropoda
- Class: Insecta
- Order: Lepidoptera
- Family: Sphingidae
- Genus: Dahira
- Species: D. uljanae

Binomial name
- Dahira uljanae Brechlin & Melichar, 2006

Species of moth

Dahira uljanae is a moth of the family Sphingidae which is endemic to China.
