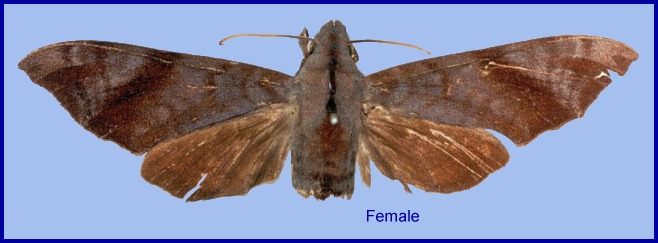

Scientific classification
- Kingdom: Animalia
- Phylum: Arthropoda
- Class: Insecta
- Order: Lepidoptera
- Family: Sphingidae
- Genus: Dahira
- Species: D. bruno

Binomial name
- Dahira bruno (Bryk, 1944)

Synonyms
- Gehlenia bruno Bryk, 1944

= Dahira bruno =

Species of moth

Dahira bruno is a moth of the family Sphingidae first described by Felix Bryk in 1944. It is known from Myanmar and possibly south-western China.
