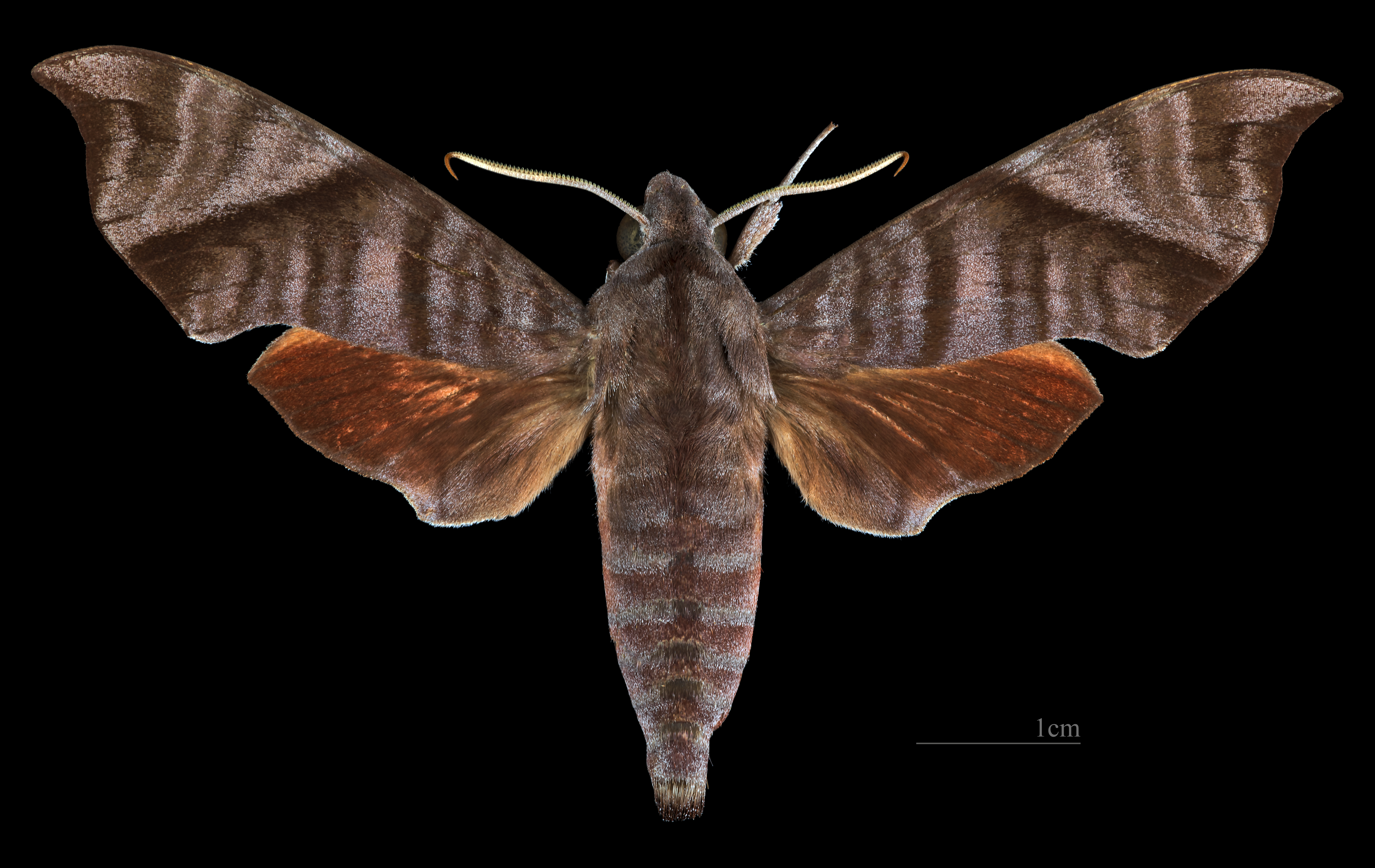
- Dahira falcata ♂
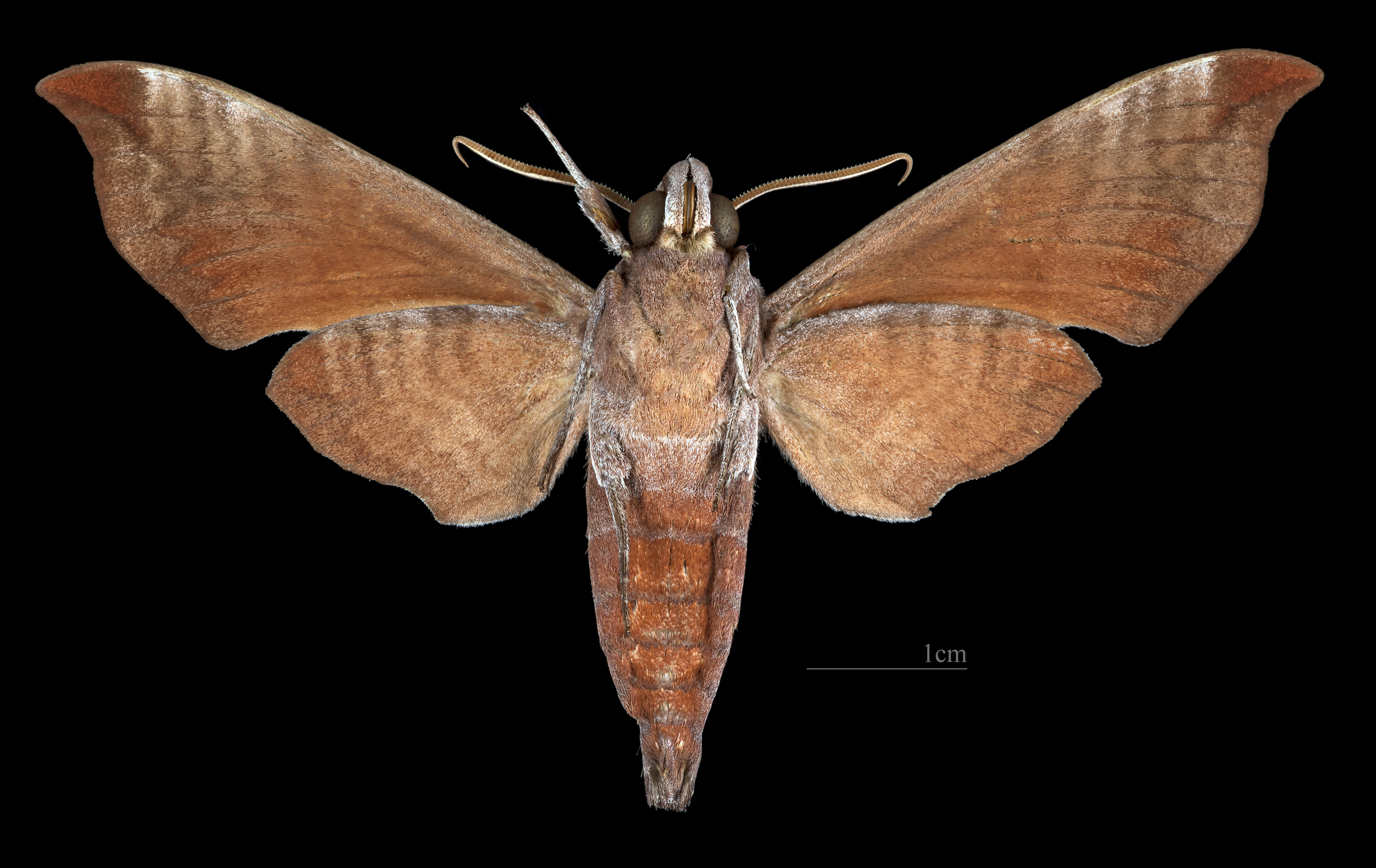
- Dahira falcata ♂ △

Scientific classification
- Kingdom: Animalia
- Phylum: Arthropoda
- Class: Insecta
- Order: Lepidoptera
- Family: Sphingidae
- Genus: Dahira
- Species: D. falcata

Binomial name
- Dahira falcata (Hayes, 1963)

Synonyms
- Gehlenia falcata Hayes, 1963

= Dahira falcata =

Species of moth

Dahira falcata is a moth of the family Sphingidae. It is known from Burma, Thailand, Malaysia and Indonesia.
