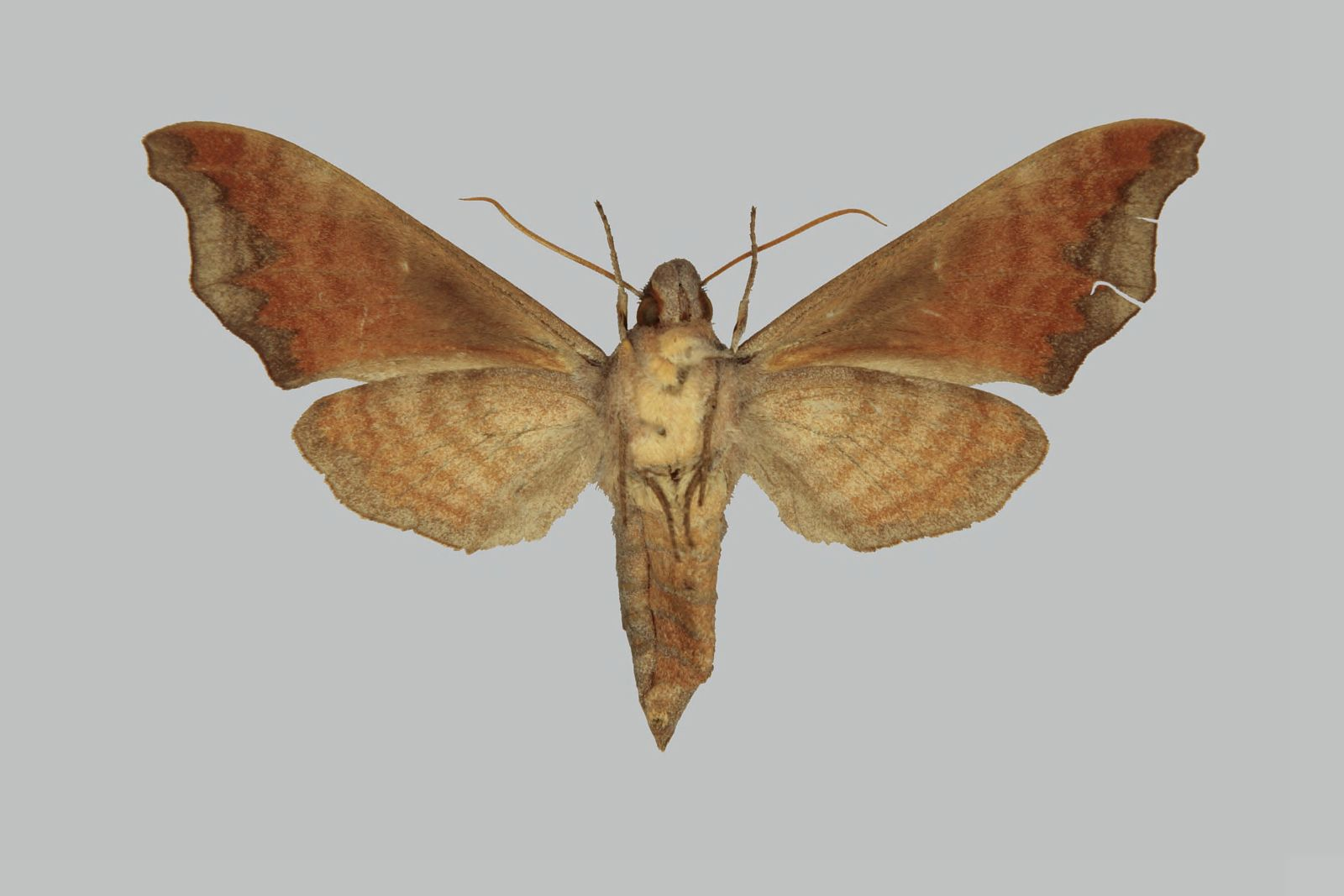
- Dahira yunlongensis, female, underside

Scientific classification
- Kingdom: Animalia
- Phylum: Arthropoda
- Class: Insecta
- Order: Lepidoptera
- Family: Sphingidae
- Genus: Dahira
- Species: D. yunlongensis

Binomial name
- Dahira yunlongensis (Brechlin, 2000)

Synonyms
- Lepchina yunlongensis Brechlin, 2000

= Dahira yunlongensis =

Species of moth

Dahira yunlongensis is a moth of the family Sphingidae. It is known from Yunnan in China.
