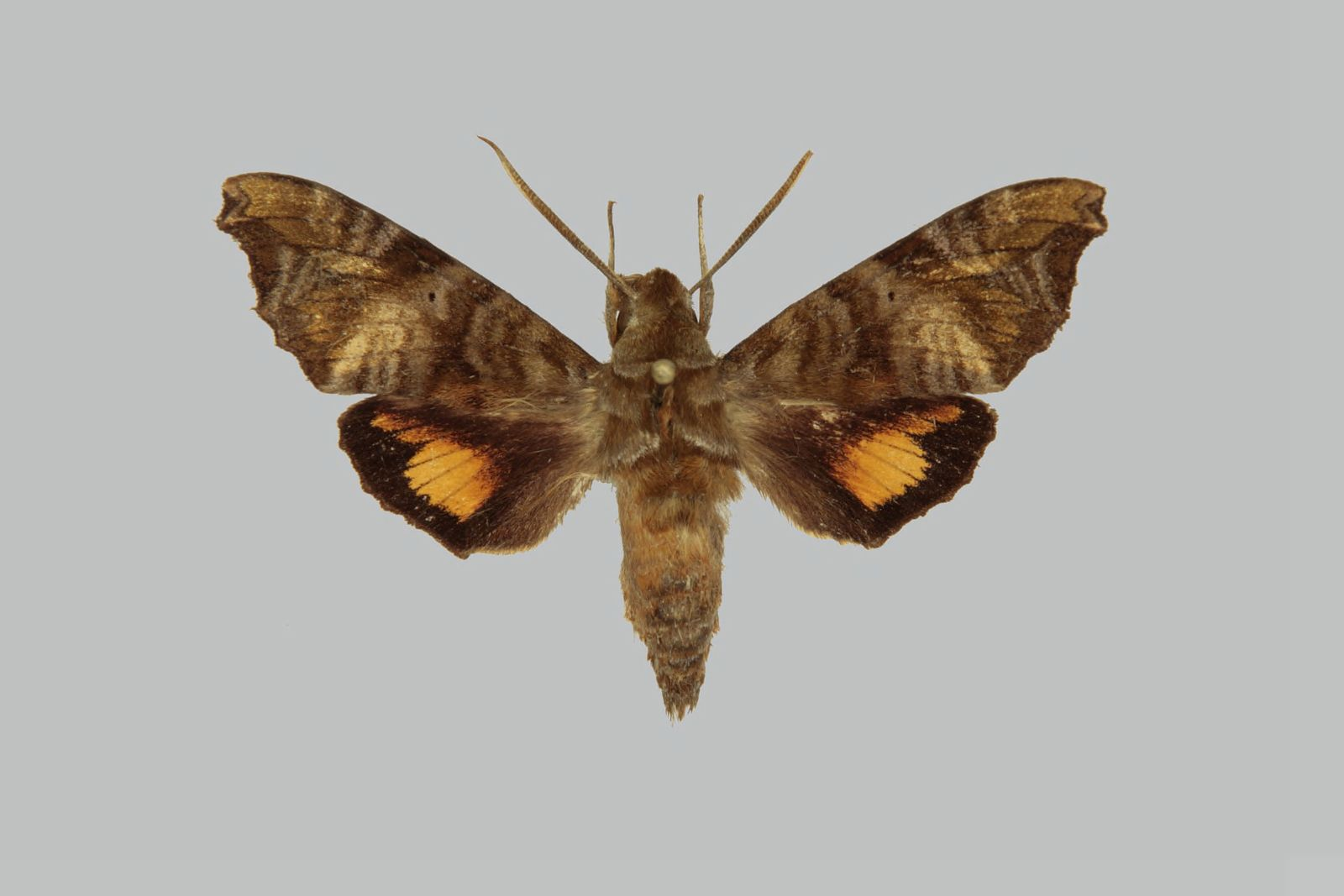
- Male

Scientific classification
- Kingdom: Animalia
- Phylum: Arthropoda
- Class: Insecta
- Order: Lepidoptera
- Family: Sphingidae
- Genus: Dahira
- Species: D. nili

Binomial name
- Dahira nili Brechlin, 2006

= Dahira nili =

Species of moth

Dahira nili is a moth of the family Sphingidae which is endemic to China.
