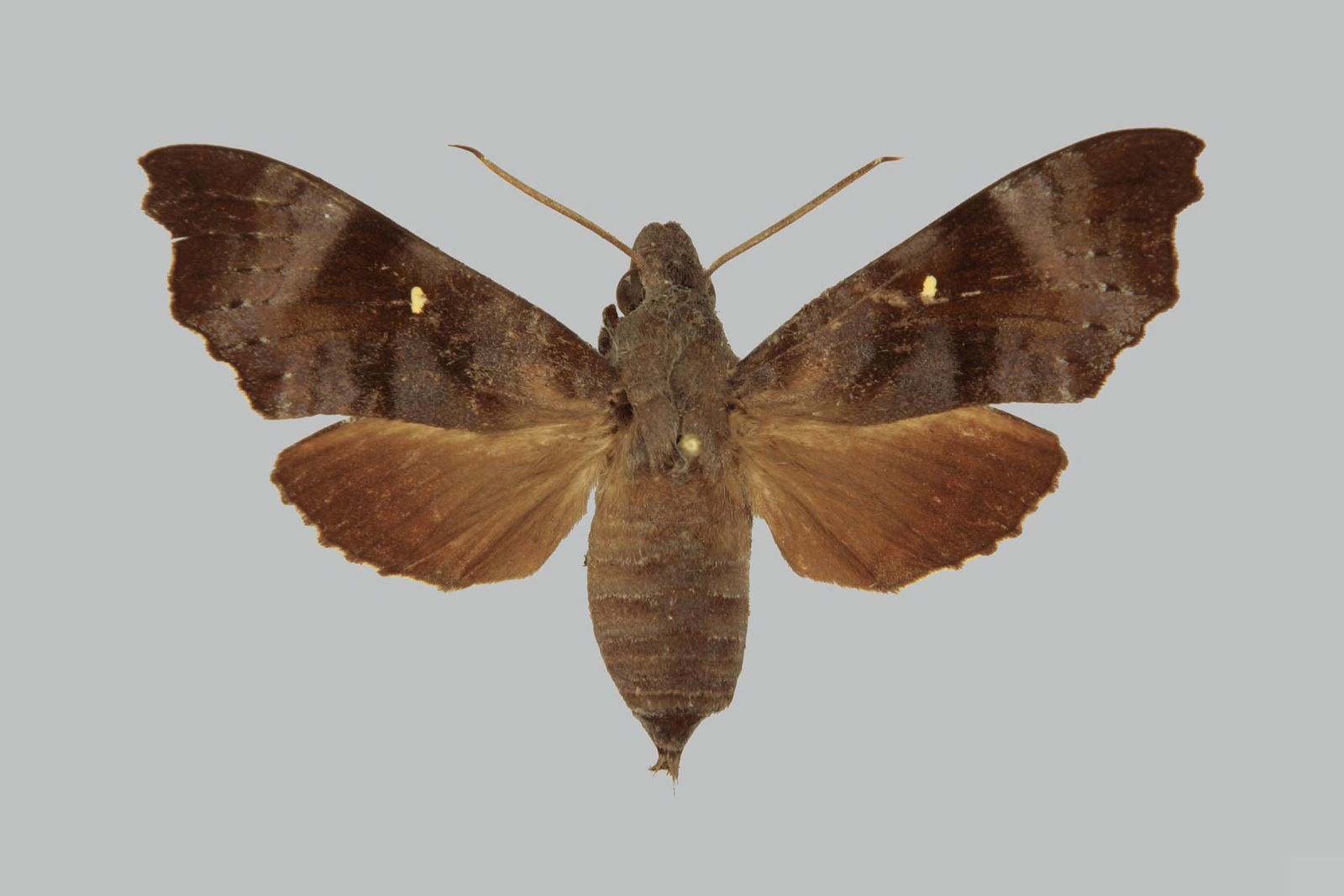
- Female

Scientific classification
- Kingdom: Animalia
- Phylum: Arthropoda
- Class: Insecta
- Order: Lepidoptera
- Family: Sphingidae
- Genus: Dahira
- Species: D. rebeccae

Binomial name
- Dahira rebeccae (Hogenes & Treadaway, 1999)

Synonyms
- Acosmeryx rebeccae Hogenes & Treadaway, 1999

= Dahira rebeccae =

Species of moth

Dahira rebeccae is a moth of the family Sphingidae. It was described by Willem Hogenes and Colin G. Treadaway in 1999. It is known from the Philippines.
