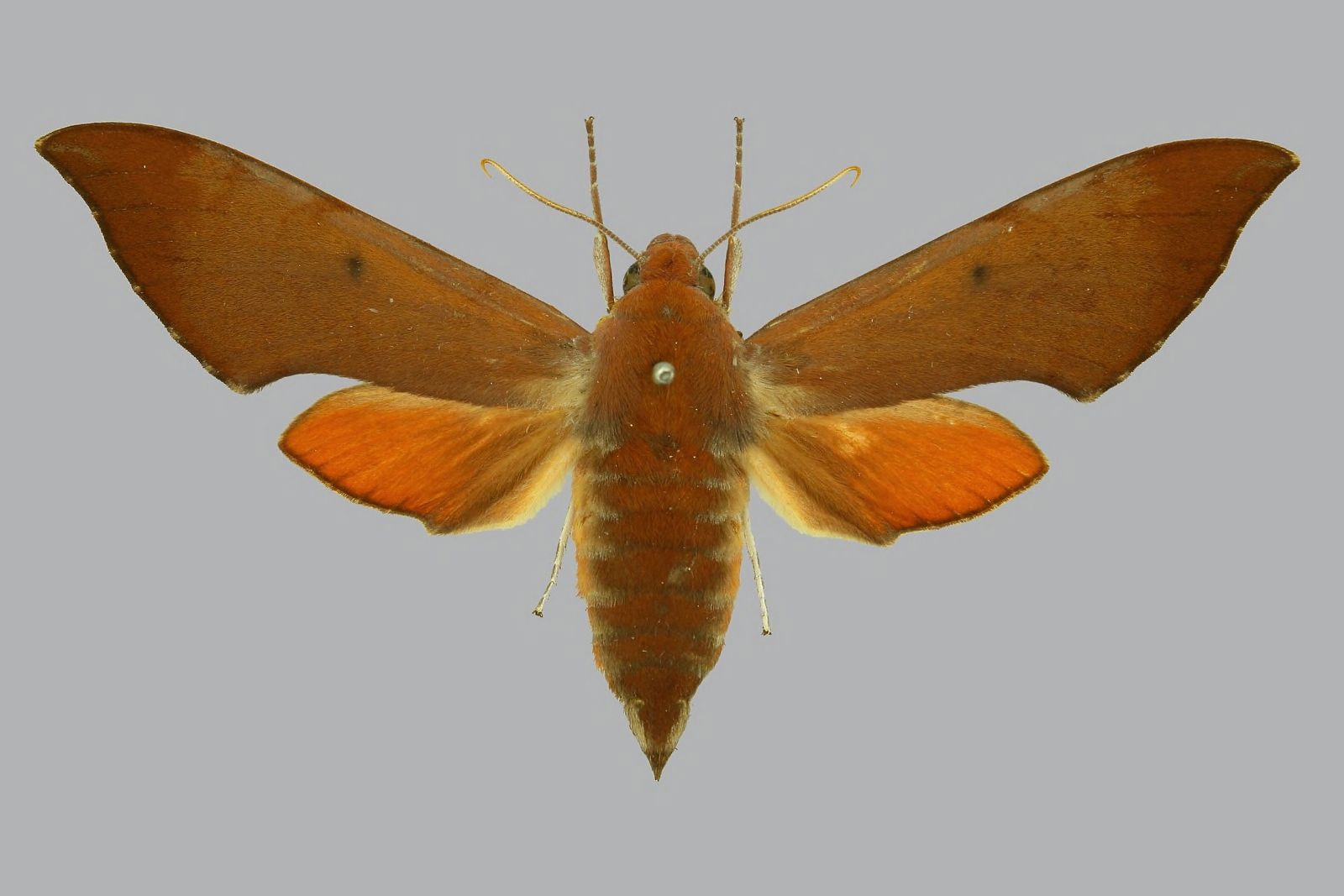
- Female

Scientific classification
- Kingdom: Animalia
- Phylum: Arthropoda
- Class: Insecta
- Order: Lepidoptera
- Family: Sphingidae
- Genus: Dahira
- Species: D. rubiginosa

Binomial name
- Dahira rubiginosa Moore, 1888

Synonyms
- Ambulyx rubescens Butler, 1889; Theretra fukienensis Meng, 1986

= Dahira rubiginosa =

Species of moth

Dahira rubiginosa, the rosy dahira, is a moth of the family Sphingidae. It is found from north-western India across Nepal and southern China to northern Taiwan and southern Japan.

The wingspan is 75–86 mm. The forewing upperside is almost uniformly brown with a small dark discal spot. The hindwing upperside is almost uniform orange with a narrow dark brown fringe and blackish-grey basal and tornal area. Adults rests with their body parallel to the surface, the wings held slightly below the horizontal. When disturbed the moth presses its head against the surface and raises the body at an angle to it.

The larvae have been recorded feeding on Ilex rotunda in Japan.
