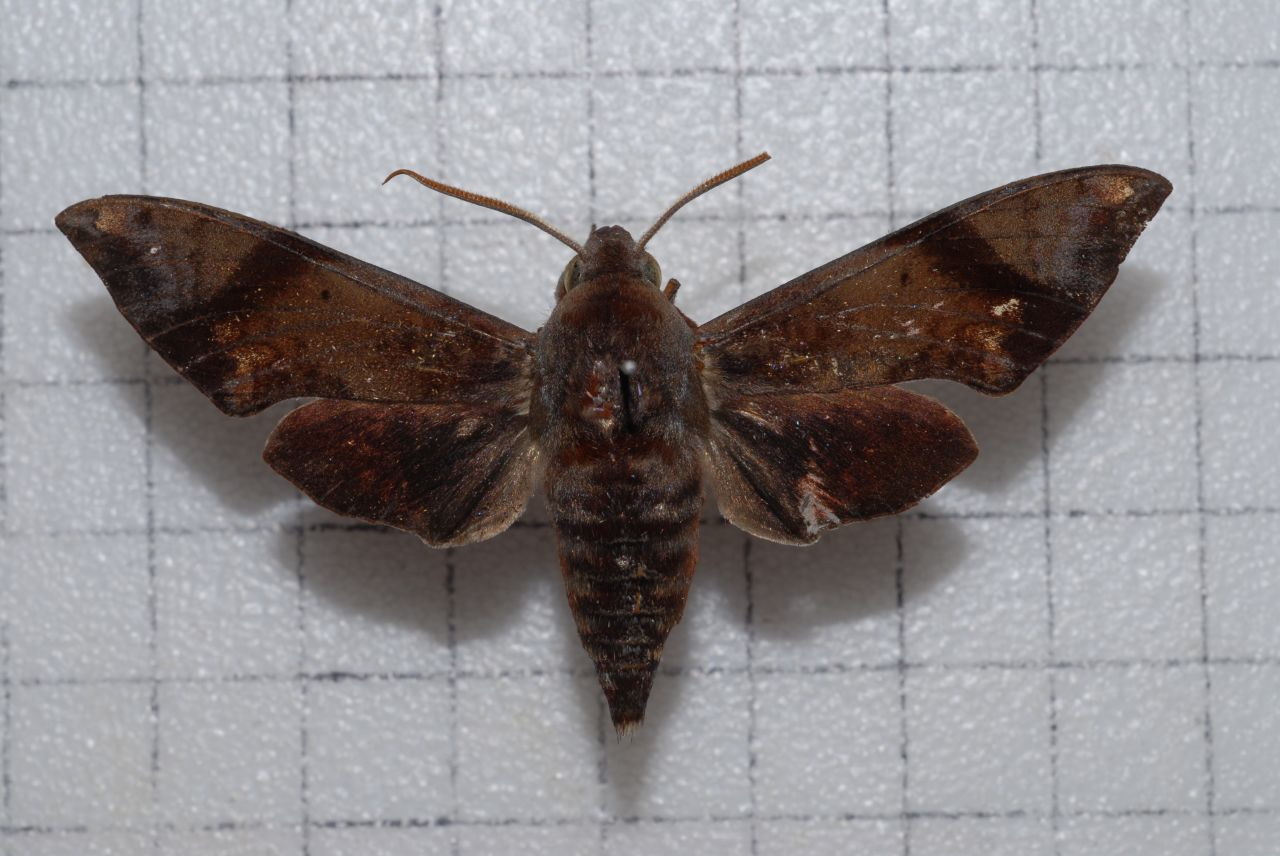
- Dahira obliquifascia

Scientific classification
- Kingdom: Animalia
- Phylum: Arthropoda
- Clade: Pancrustacea
- Class: Insecta
- Order: Lepidoptera
- Family: Sphingidae
- Subtribe: Macroglossina
- Genus: Dahira; Moore, 1888

Species
- See text

Synonyms
- Gehlenia Bryk, 1944; Lepchina Oberthür, 1904; Thibetia Joicey & Kaye, 1917

= Dahira =

Genus of moths

Dahira is a genus of moths in the family Sphingidae.

== Species ==
- Dahira bruno (Bryk, 1944)
- Dahira falcata (Hayes, 1963)
- Dahira jitkae Haxaire & Melichar, 2007
- Dahira kitchingi (Brechlin, 2000)
- Dahira klaudiae Brechlin, Melichar & Haxaire, 2006
- Dahira marisae Schnitzler & Stüning, 2009
- Dahira nili Brechlin, 2006
- Dahira niphaphylla (Joicey & Kaye, 1917)
- Dahira obliquifascia (Hampson, 1910)
- Dahira pinratanai (Cadiou, 1991)
- Dahira plutenkoi (Brechlin, 2002)
- Dahira rebeccae (Hogenes & Treadaway, 1999)
- Dahira rubiginosa Moore, 1888
- Dahira svetsinjaevae Brechlin, 2006
- Dahira taiwana (Brechlin, 1998)
- Dahira tridens (Oberthür, 1904)
- Dahira uljanae Brechlin & Melichar, 2006
- Dahira viksinjaevi Brechlin, 2006
- Dahira yunlongensis (Brechlin, 2000)
- Dahira yunnanfuana (Clark, 1925)
