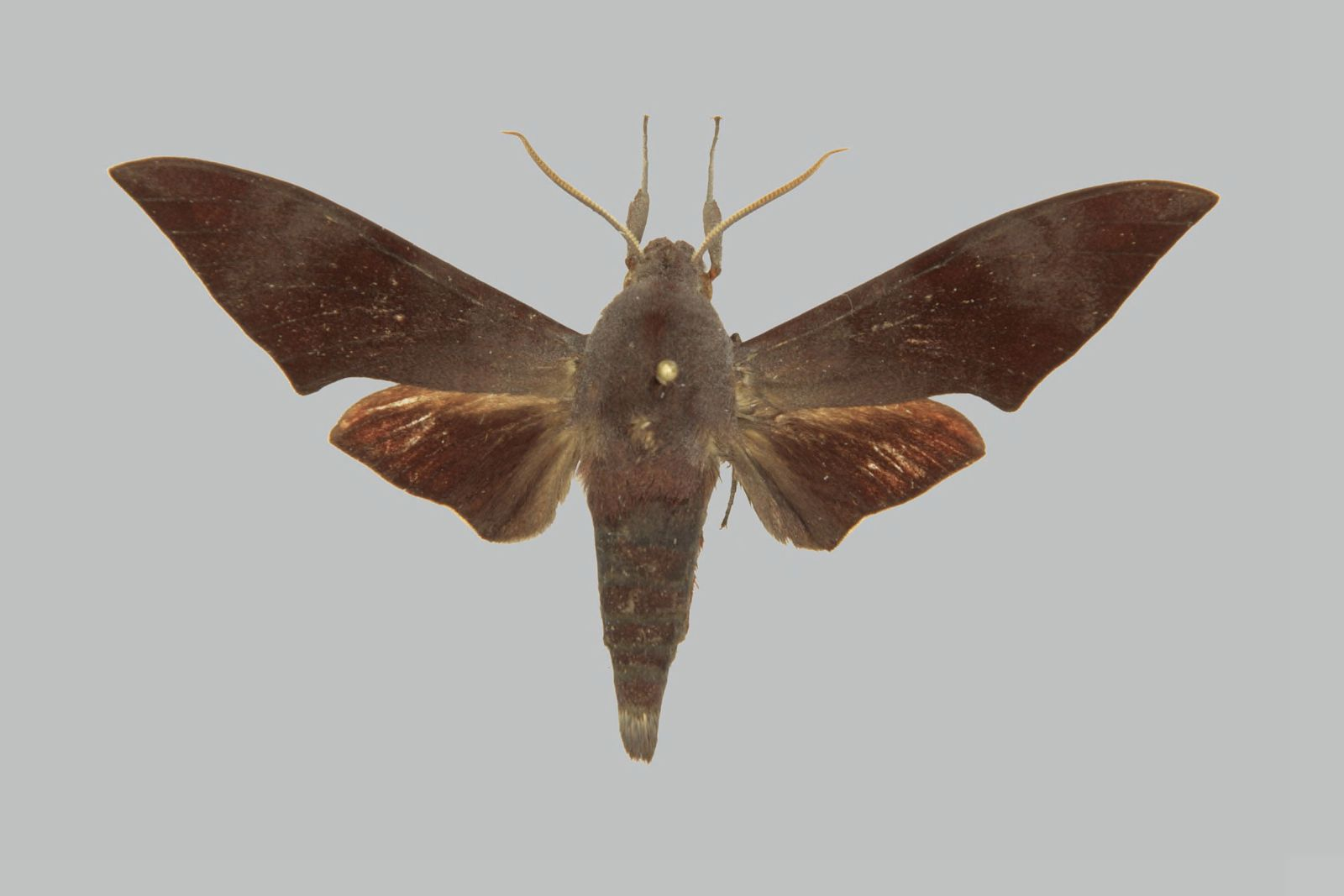
- Male

Scientific classification
- Kingdom: Animalia
- Phylum: Arthropoda
- Class: Insecta
- Order: Lepidoptera
- Family: Sphingidae
- Genus: Dahira
- Species: D. svetsinjaevae

Binomial name
- Dahira svetsinjaevae Brechlin, 2006

= Dahira svetsinjaevae =

Species of moth

Dahira svetsinjaevae is a moth of the family Sphingidae that is endemic to China.

The length of the forewings is 27–29 millimetres (1.1–1.1 in).
