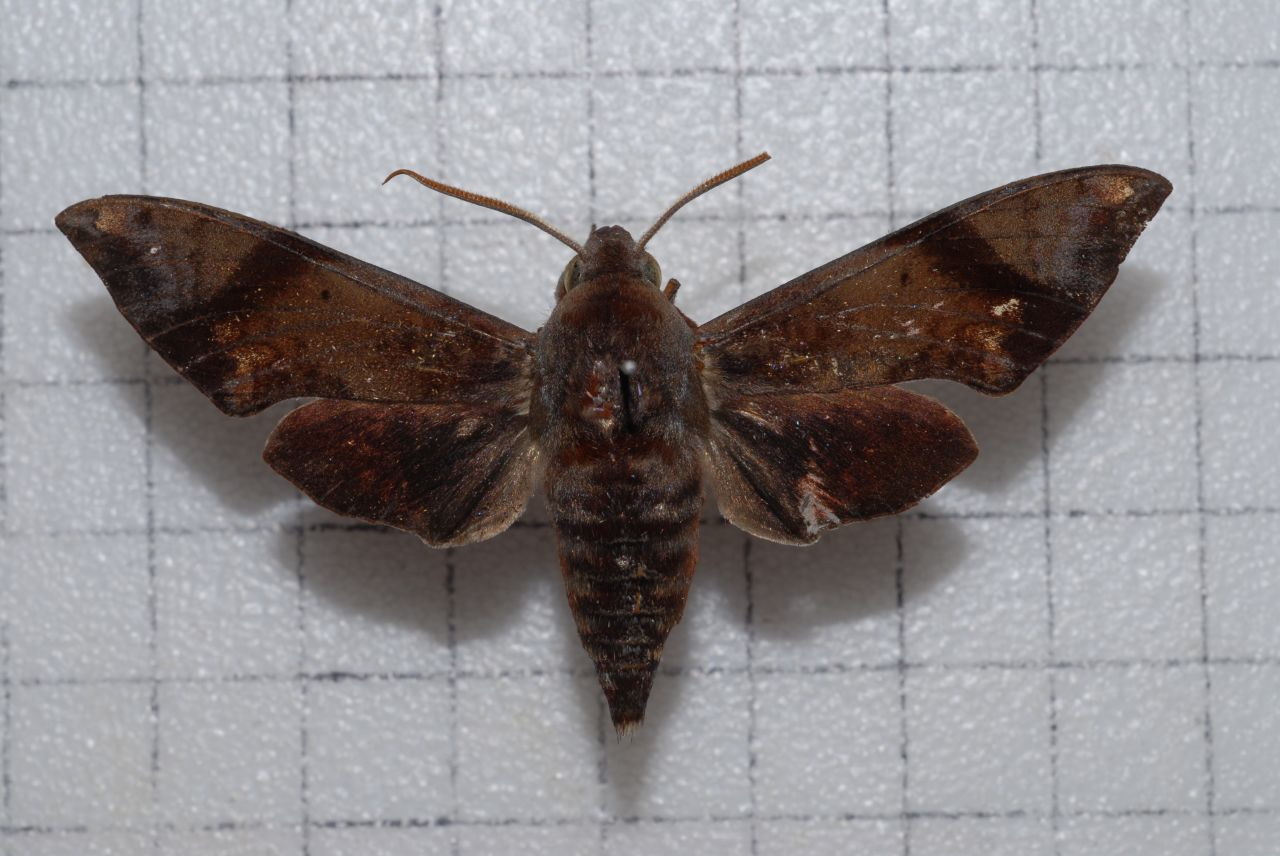

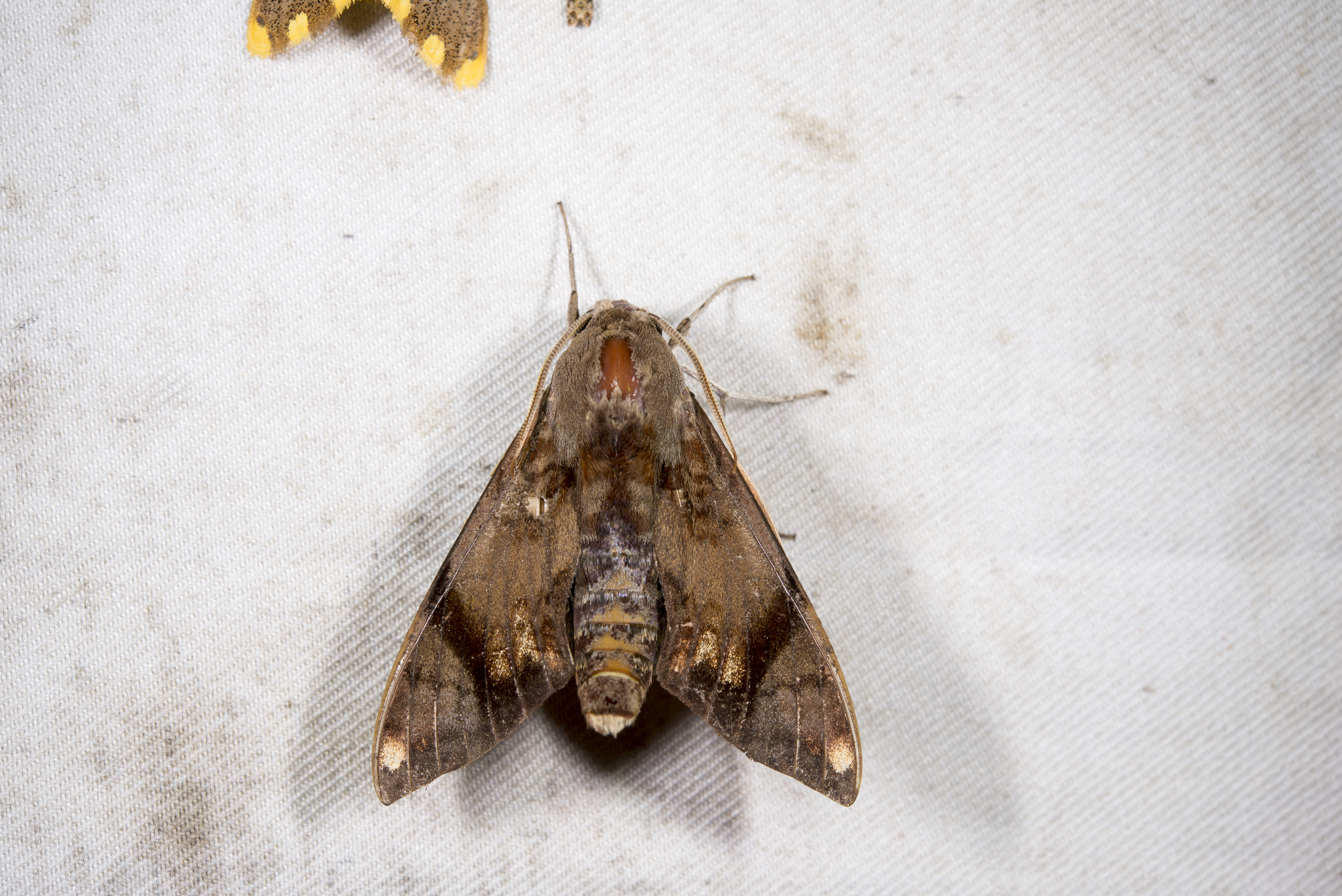

Scientific classification
- Kingdom: Animalia
- Phylum: Arthropoda
- Class: Insecta
- Order: Lepidoptera
- Family: Sphingidae
- Genus: Dahira
- Species: D. obliquifascia

Binomial name
- Dahira obliquifascia (Hampson, 1910)

Synonyms
- Ampelophaga obliquifascia Hampson, 1910; Acosmeryx huangshana Meng, 1982; Ampelophaga baibarana Matsumura, 1927; Ampelophaga fujiana Zhu & Wang, 1997; Gehlenia obliguifascia Hampson

= Dahira obliquifascia =

Black-striped dahira

Species of moth

Dahira obliquifascia, the black-striped dahira, is a moth of the family Sphingidae. It is known from north-eastern India, Nepal, Thailand, southern China, Taiwan, Vietnam and Peninsular Malaysia.

The wingspan is about 78 mm.
