= Dahira marisae =

Scientific classification
- Kingdom: Animalia
- Phylum: Arthropoda
- Class: Insecta
- Order: Lepidoptera
- Family: Sphingidae
- Genus: Dahira
- Species: D. marisae

Binomial name
- Dahira marisae Schnitzler & Stüning, 2009

Species of moth

Dahira marisae is a moth of the family Sphingidae. It is known from Bhutan.
