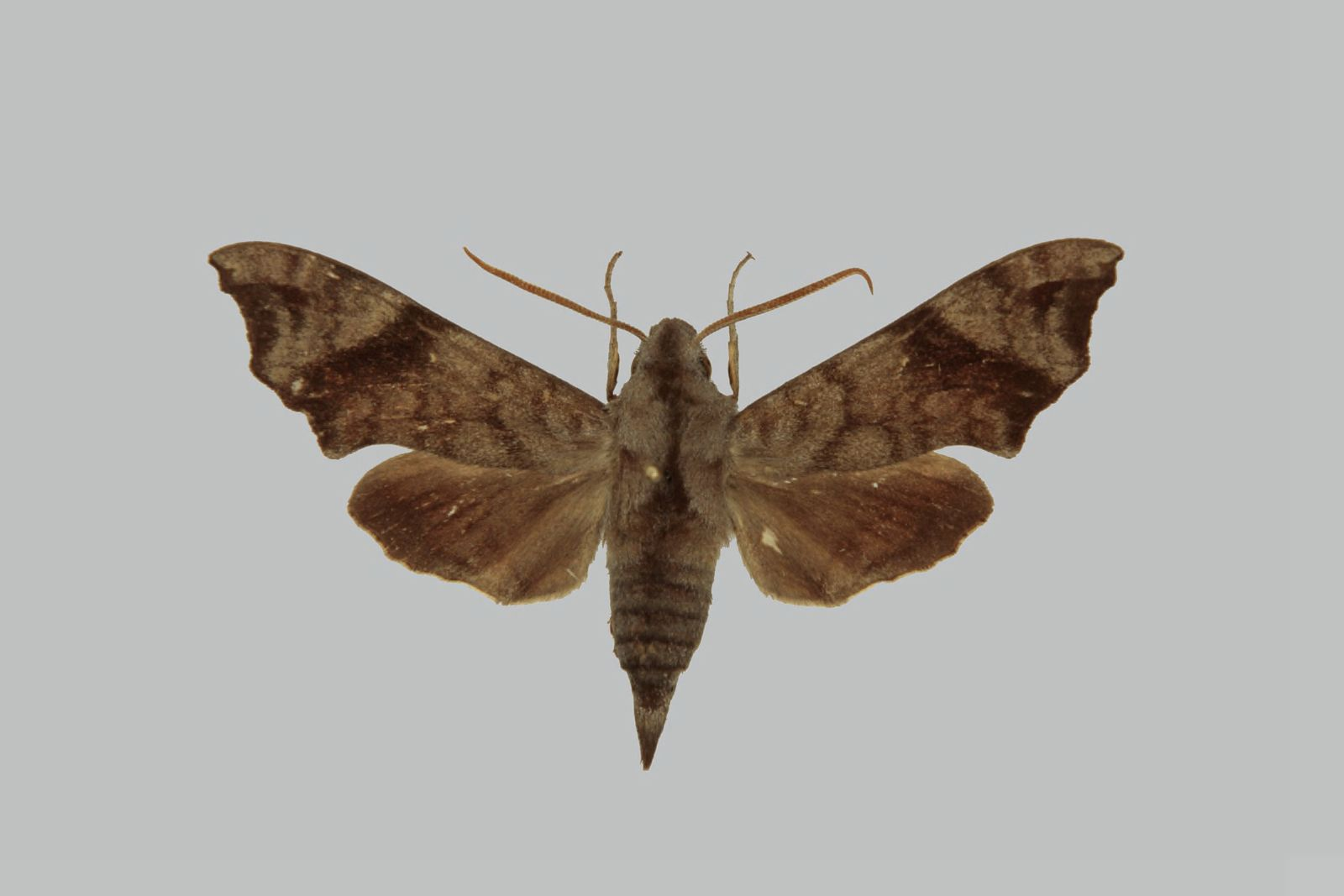
- Male

Scientific classification
- Kingdom: Animalia
- Phylum: Arthropoda
- Class: Insecta
- Order: Lepidoptera
- Family: Sphingidae
- Genus: Dahira
- Species: D. kitchingi

Binomial name
- Dahira kitchingi (Brechlin, 2000)

Synonyms
- Lepchina kitchingi Brechlin, 2000

= Dahira kitchingi =

Species of moth

Dahira kitchingi is a moth of the family Sphingidae. It is known from China.
