= Manduca empusa =

Scientific classification
- Kingdom: Animalia
- Phylum: Arthropoda
- Class: Insecta
- Order: Lepidoptera
- Family: Sphingidae
- Genus: Manduca
- Species: M. empusa

Binomial name
- Manduca empusa (Kernbach, 1965)

Synonyms
- Protoparce empusa Kernbach, 1965

Species of moth

Manduca empusa is a moth of the family Sphingidae. It is known from Venezuela.
