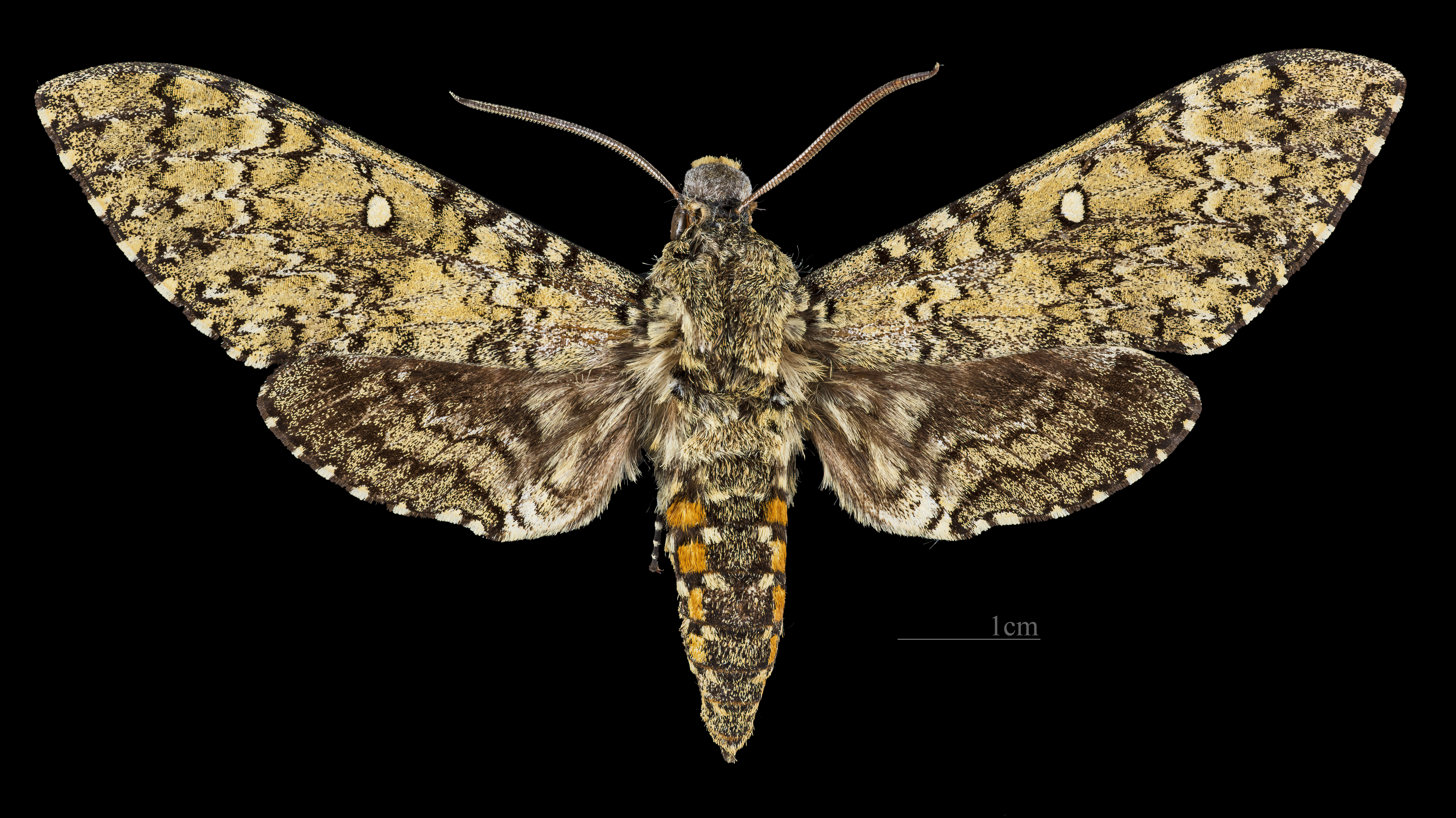
- Male dorsal
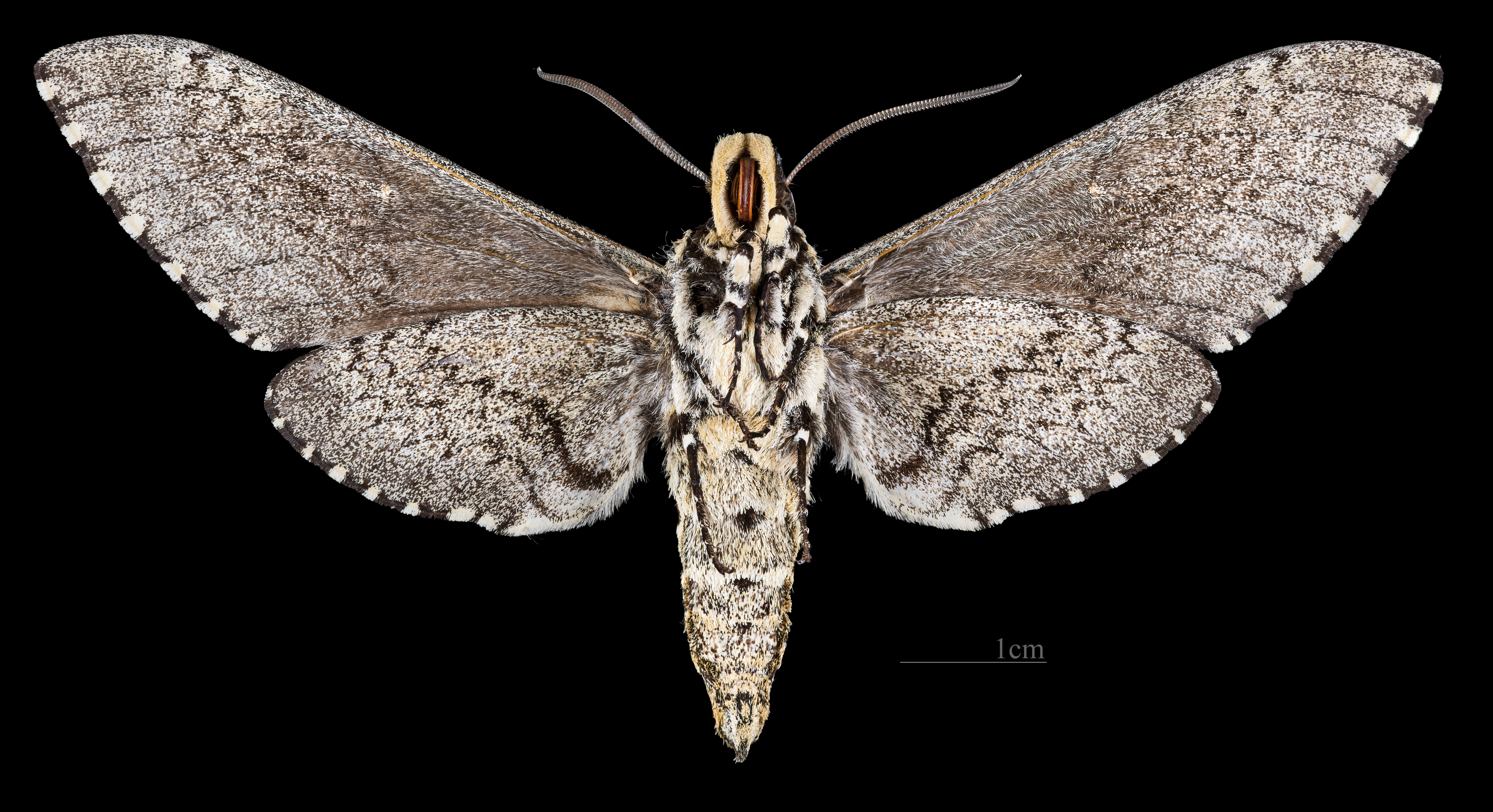
- Male ventral

Scientific classification
- Kingdom: Animalia
- Phylum: Arthropoda
- Class: Insecta
- Order: Lepidoptera
- Family: Sphingidae
- Genus: Manduca
- Species: M. stuarti

Binomial name
- Manduca stuarti (Rothschild, 1896)

Synonyms
- Phlegethontius stuarti Rothschild, 1896

= Manduca stuarti =

Species of moth

Manduca stuarti is a moth of the family Sphingidae.

== Distribution ==
It is known from Bolivia.

== Description ==
It can be distinguished from all other Manduca species by the pattern and structure. There is no lateral, yellow patch found on the abdomen underside, but there are intensely coloured patches present on the more distal segments.

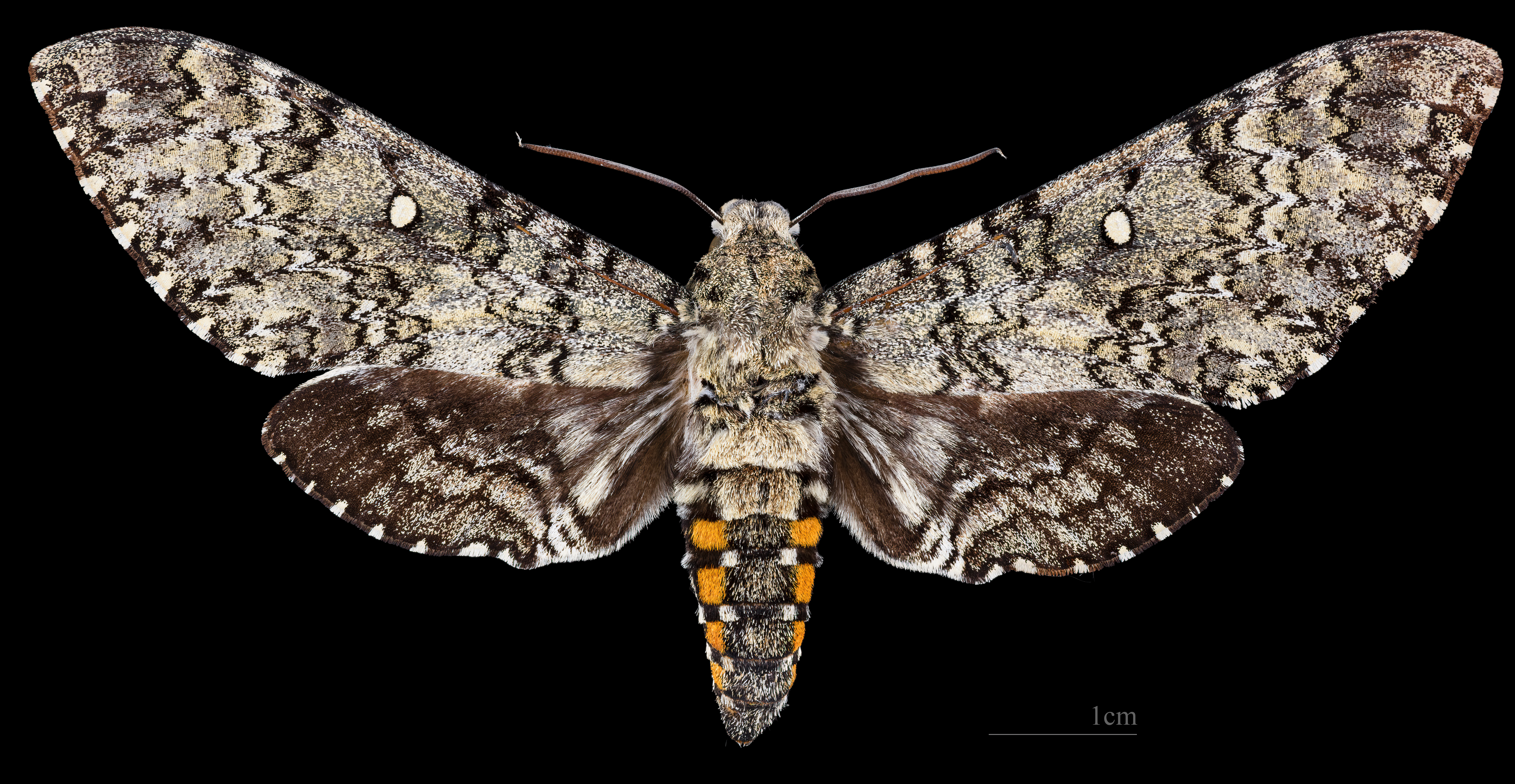
Female - Dorsal side

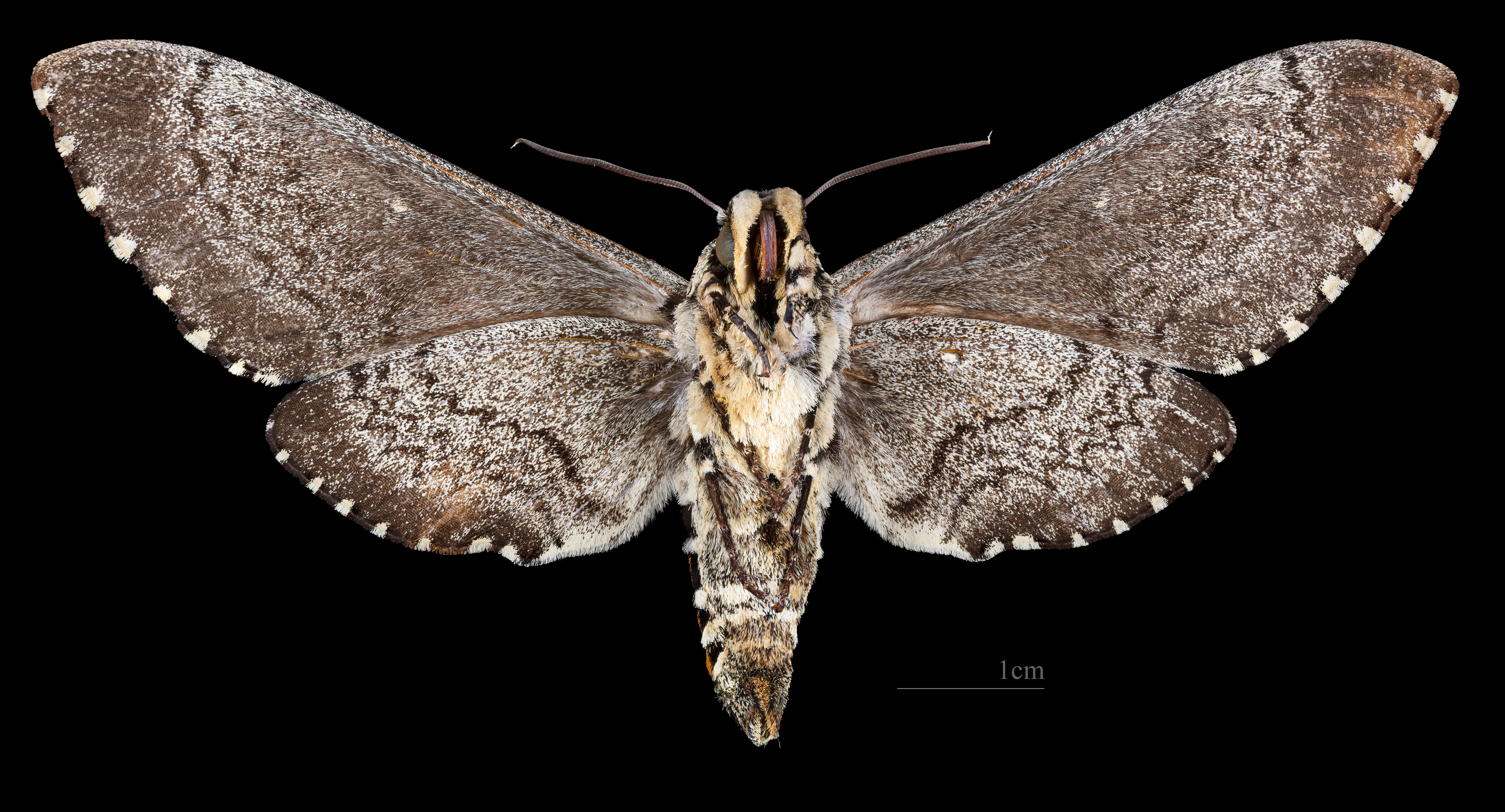
Female - △ Ventral side

== Biology ==
Adults have been recorded from October to December.
