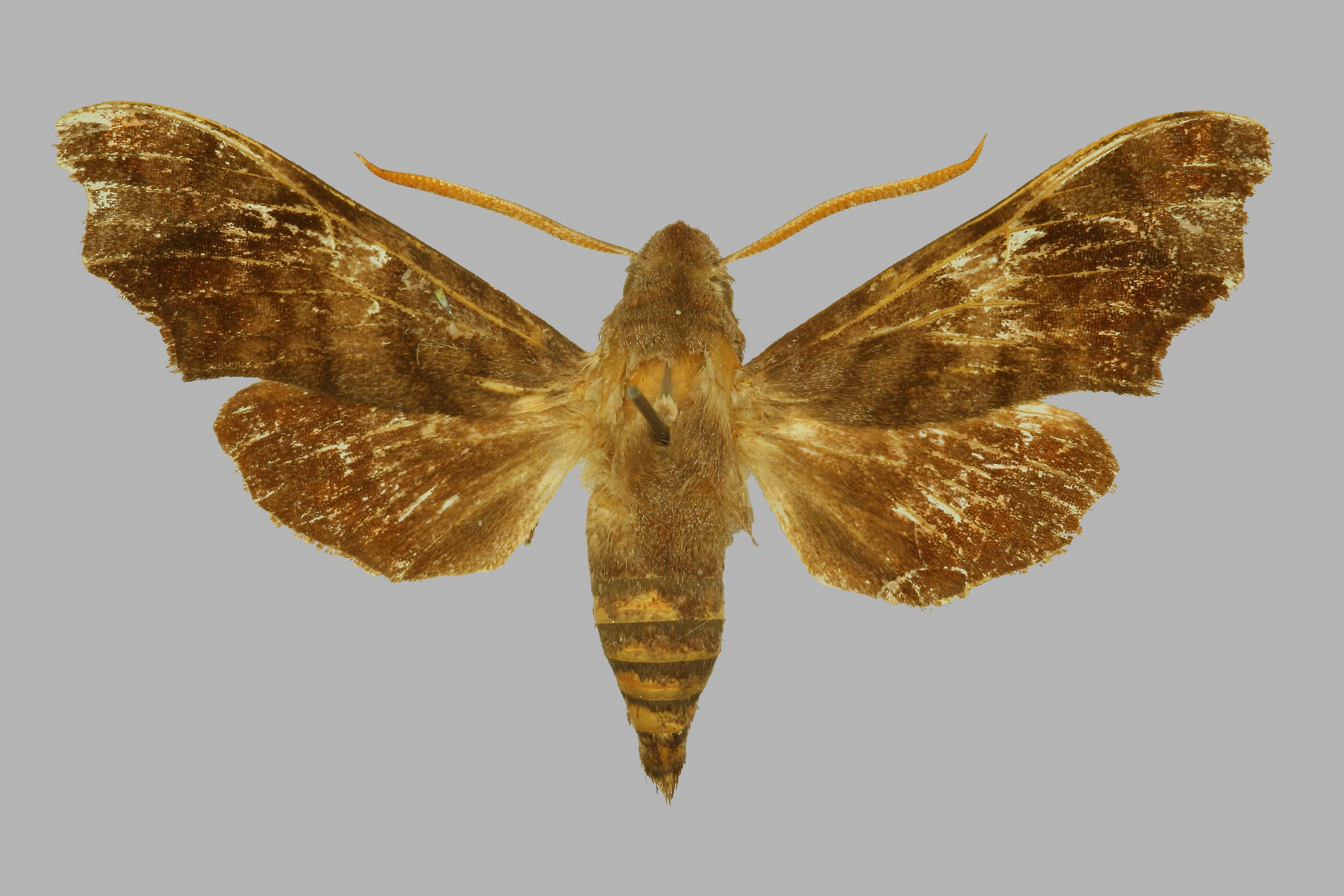

Scientific classification
- Kingdom: Animalia
- Phylum: Arthropoda
- Class: Insecta
- Order: Lepidoptera
- Family: Sphingidae
- Genus: Dahira
- Species: D. niphaphylla

Binomial name
- Dahira niphaphylla (Joicey & Kaye, 1917)

Synonyms
- Thibetia niphaphylla Joicey & Kaye, 1917

= Dahira niphaphylla =

Species of moth

Dahira niphaphylla is a moth of the family Sphingidae. It is known from China.
