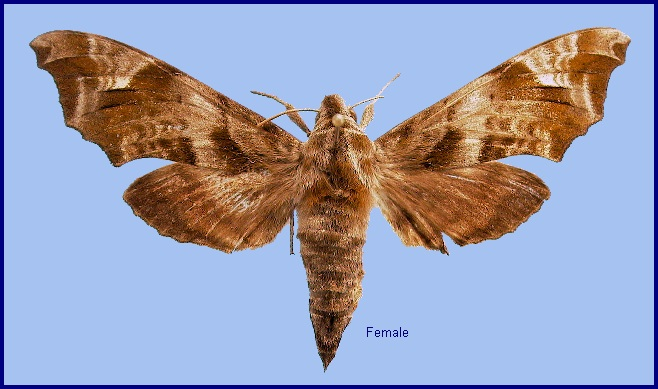
- Dahira yunnanfuana

Scientific classification
- Kingdom: Animalia
- Phylum: Arthropoda
- Class: Insecta
- Order: Lepidoptera
- Family: Sphingidae
- Genus: Dahira
- Species: D. yunnanfuana

Binomial name
- Dahira yunnanfuana (Clark, 1925)

Synonyms
- Acosmeryx yunnanfuana Clark, 1925; Acosmeryx montivaga Kernbach, 1966; Acosmeryx tibetana Chu & Wang, 1980

= Dahira yunnanfuana =

Species of moth

Dahira yunnanfuana is a moth of the family Sphingidae. It was described by Benjamin Preston Clark in 1925. It is found along the south-eastern slopes of the Himalaya, from Nepal through northern Myanmar to central Yunnan and Sichuan in China.
