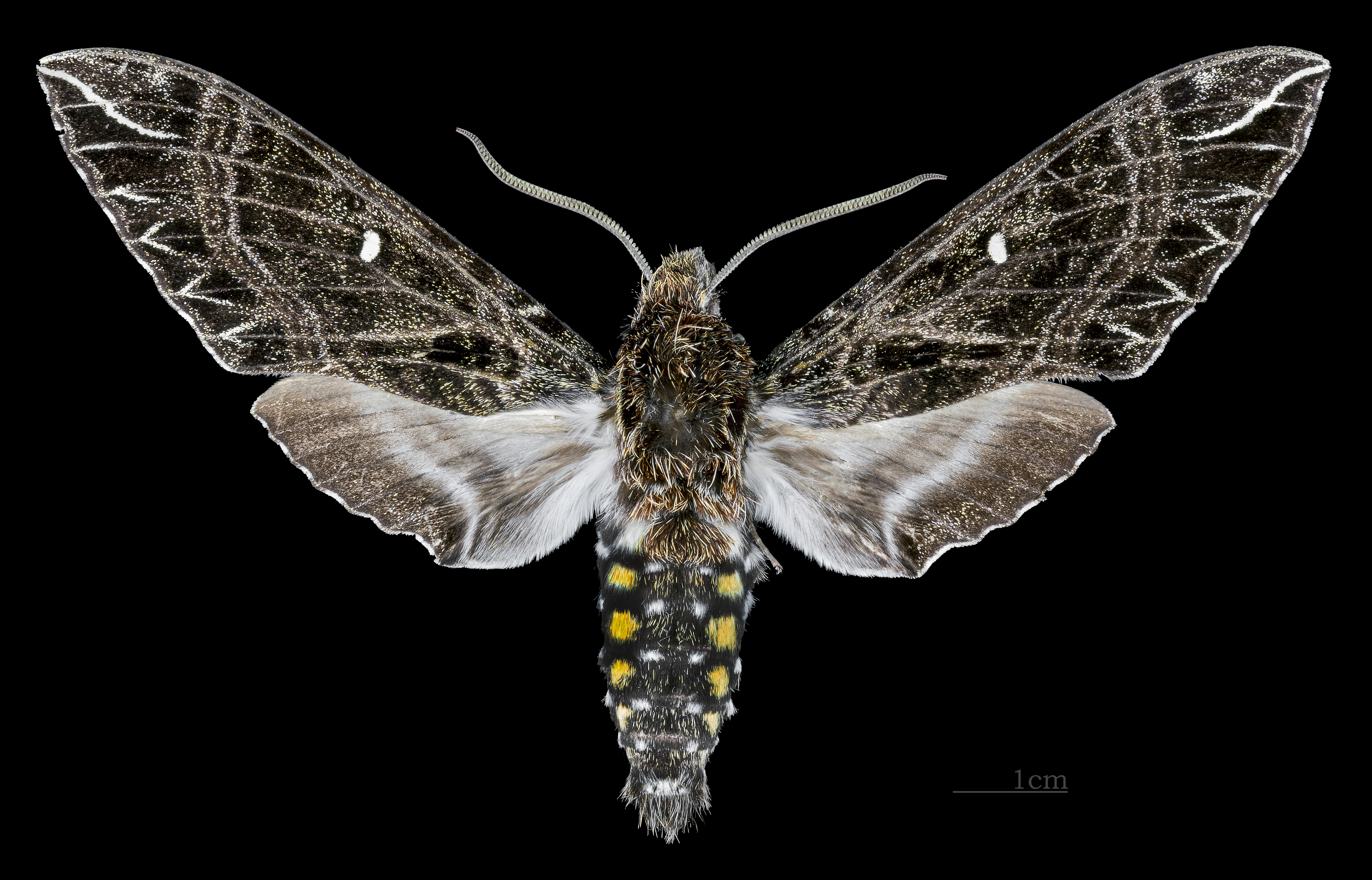
- Euryglottis guttiventris dorsal
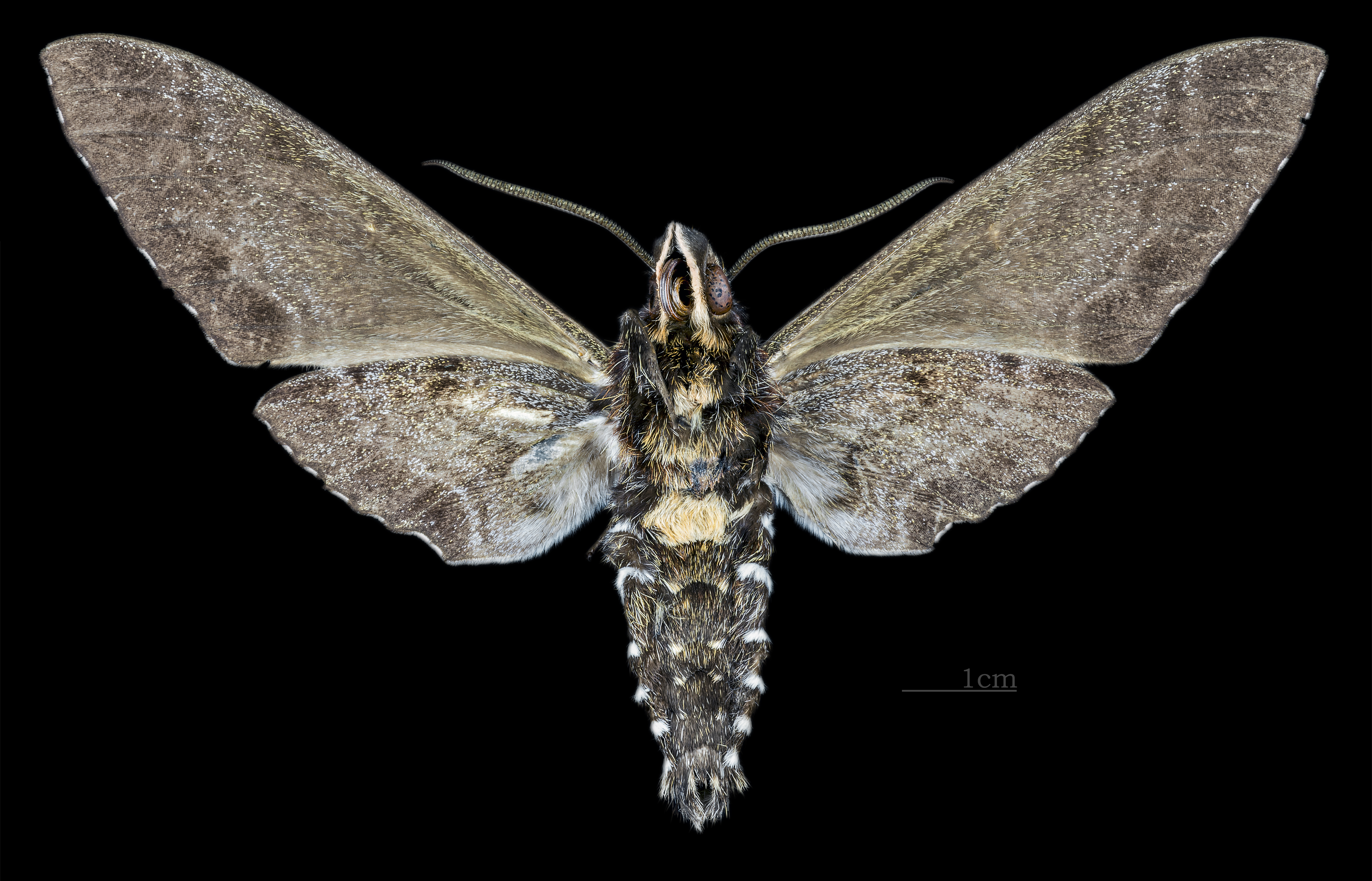
- Euryglottis guttiventris ventral

Scientific classification
- Domain: Eukaryota
- Kingdom: Animalia
- Phylum: Arthropoda
- Class: Insecta
- Order: Lepidoptera
- Family: Sphingidae
- Genus: Euryglottis
- Species: E. guttiventris

Binomial name
- Euryglottis guttiventris Rothschild & Jordan, 1903

= Euryglottis guttiventris =

Species of moth

Euryglottis guttiventris is a moth of the family Sphingidae. It is known from Bolivia, Ecuador, Peru and Argentina.

There are distinct apical spots on sternites three to five and a pale basal patch. Furthermore, the discal band and vein-streaks on the forewing upperside are less distinct than in similar Euryglottis aper.

Adults are on wing in June and December.
