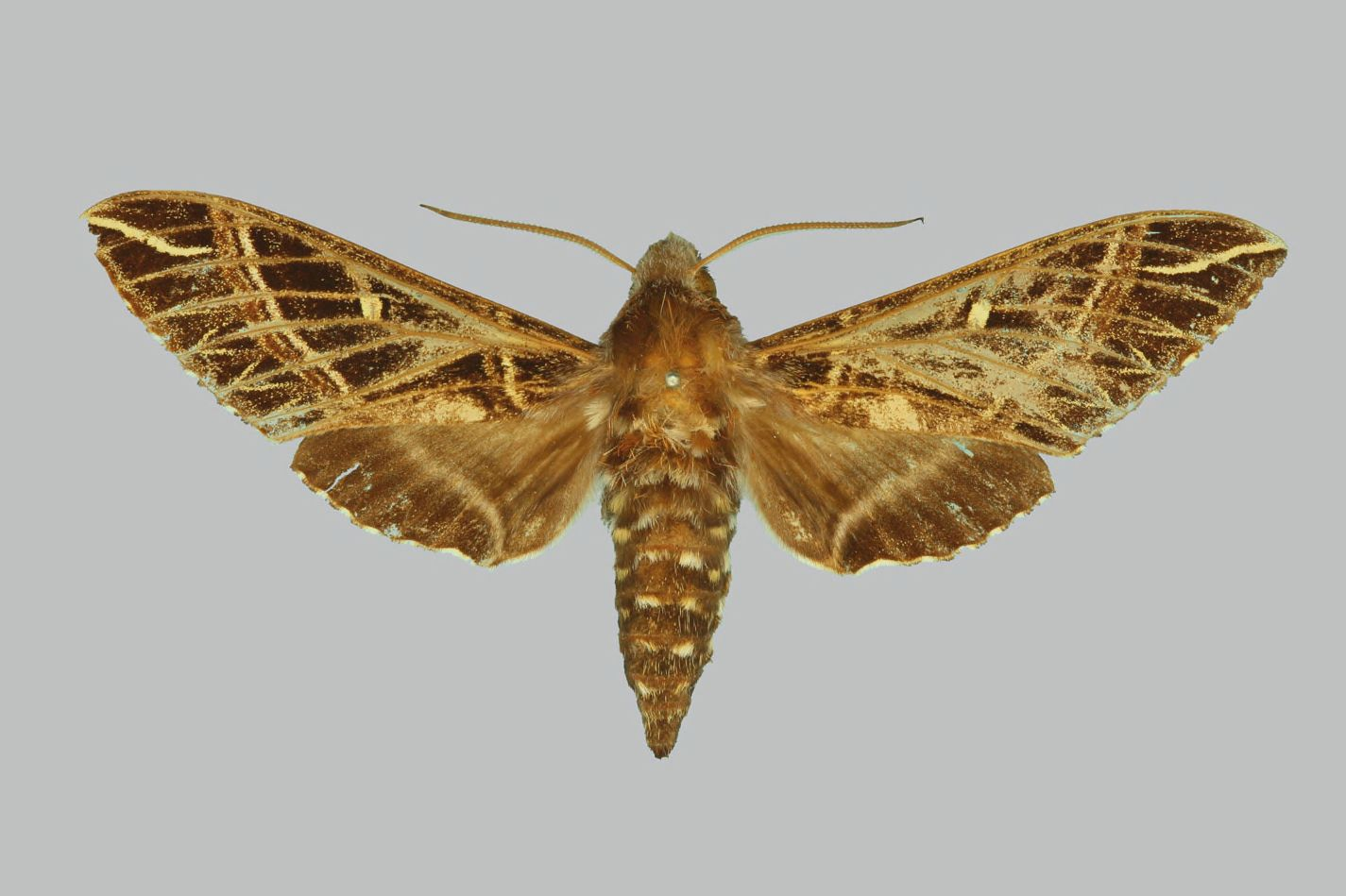
- Male

Scientific classification
- Kingdom: Animalia
- Phylum: Arthropoda
- Class: Insecta
- Order: Lepidoptera
- Family: Sphingidae
- Genus: Euryglottis
- Species: E. davidianus

Binomial name
- Euryglottis davidianus Dognin, 1891

= Euryglottis davidianus =

Species of moth

Euryglottis davidianus is a moth of the family Sphingidae. It is known from Ecuador and western Peru.

The wingspan is about 80 mm. It is similar to Euryglottis aper but can be distinguished by the paler head, paler and smaller yellow abdominal spots, and straighter subbasal and discal lines on the forewing upperside.

Adults have been recorded in March and April.
