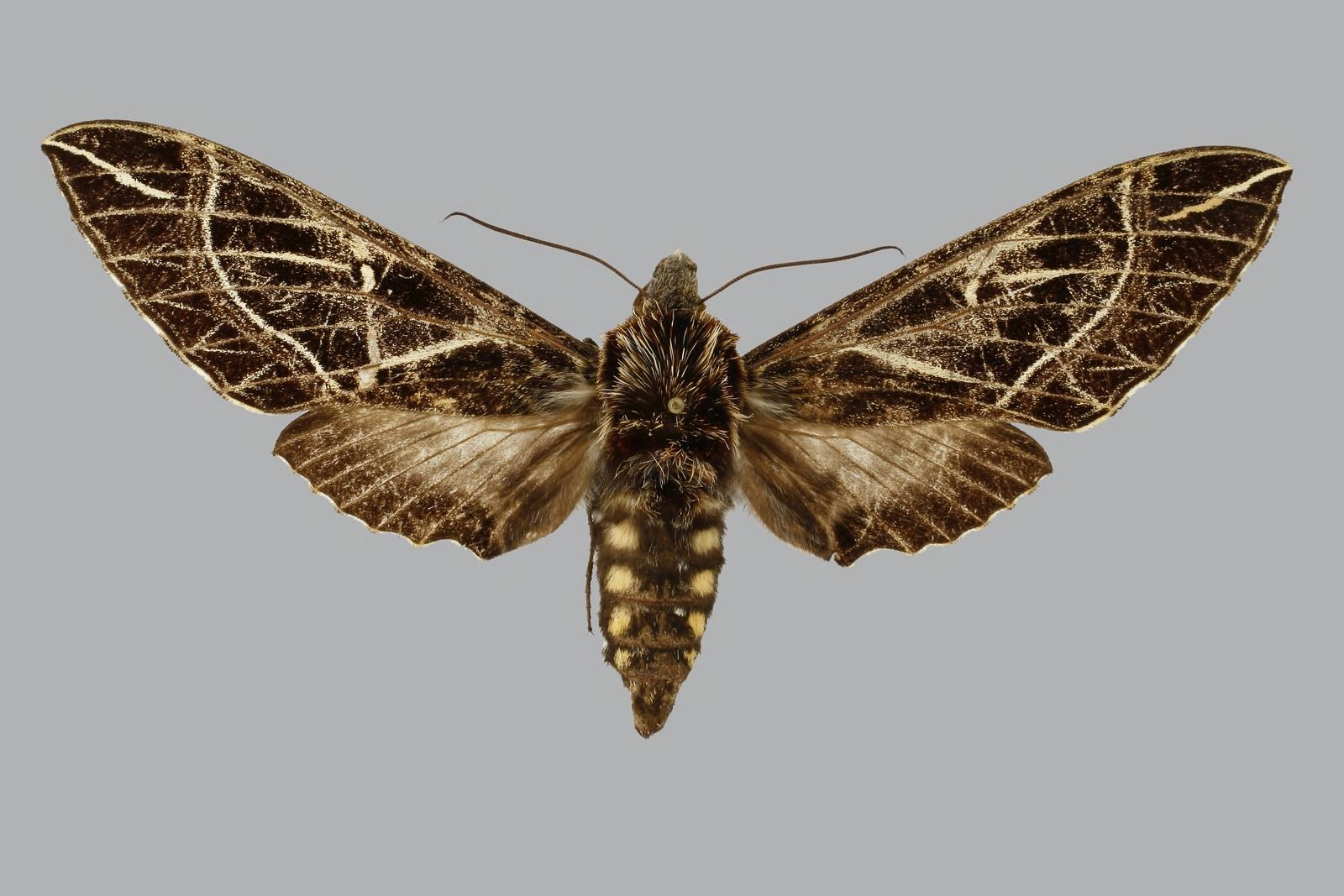

Scientific classification
- Kingdom: Animalia
- Phylum: Arthropoda
- Class: Insecta
- Order: Lepidoptera
- Family: Sphingidae
- Genus: Euryglottis
- Species: E. johannes

Binomial name
- Euryglottis johannes Eitschberger, 1998

= Euryglottis johannes =

Species of moth

Euryglottis johannes is a moth of the family Sphingidae. It is known from Venezuela.
