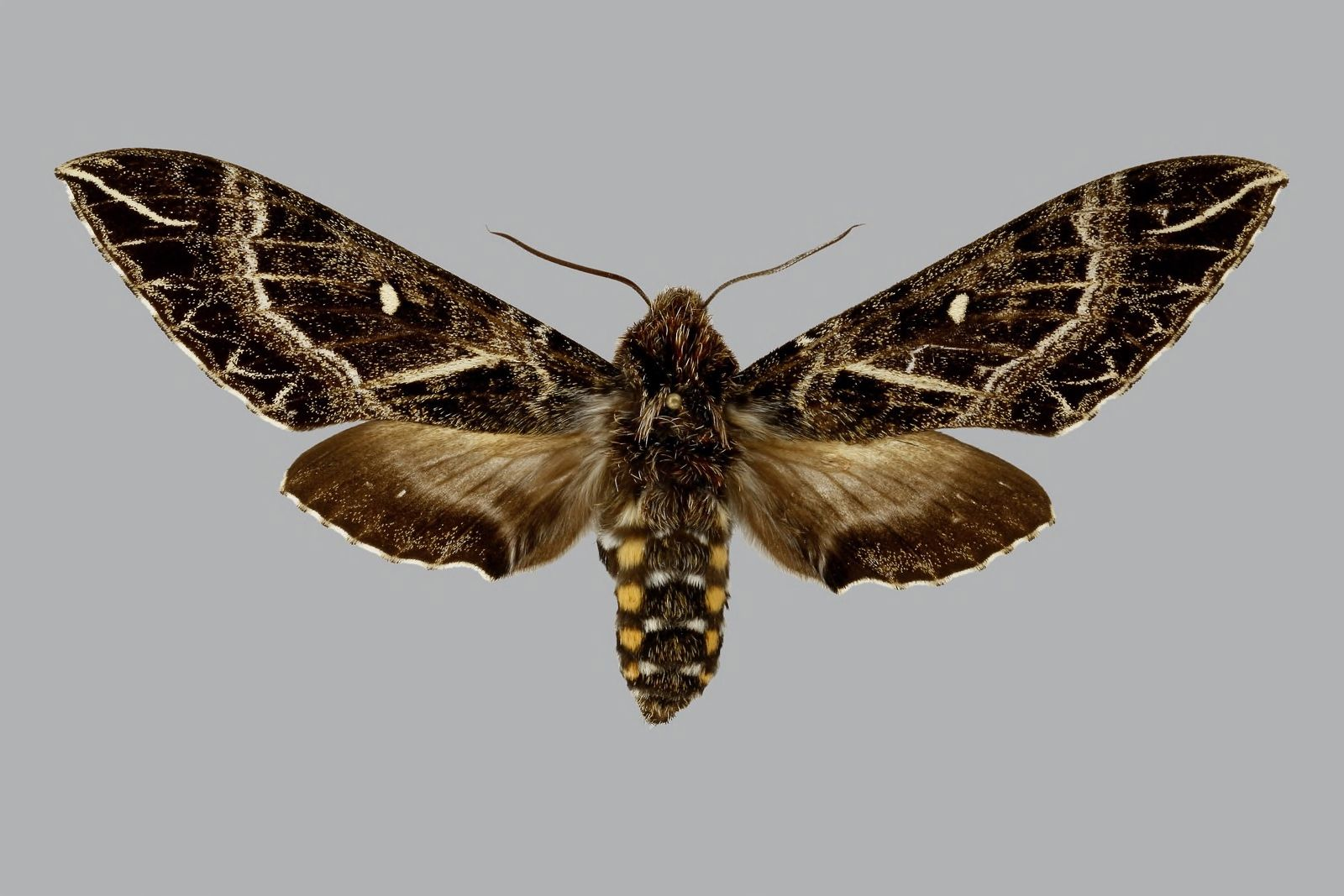
- Female

Scientific classification
- Kingdom: Animalia
- Phylum: Arthropoda
- Class: Insecta
- Order: Lepidoptera
- Family: Sphingidae
- Genus: Euryglottis
- Species: E. oliver

Binomial name
- Euryglottis oliver Eitschberger, 1998

= Euryglottis oliver =

Species of moth

Euryglottis oliver is a moth of the family Sphingidae. It is known from Peru.
