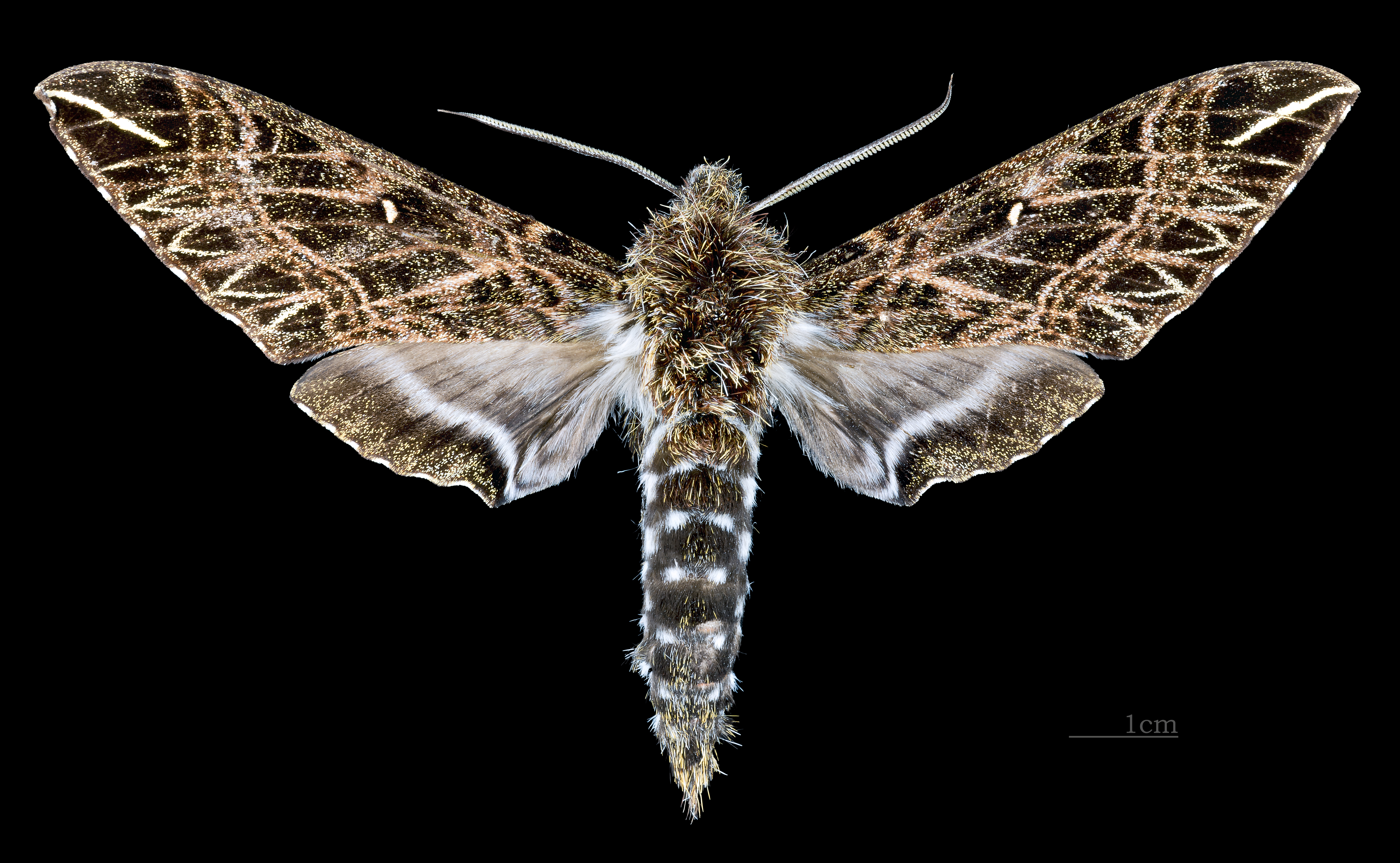
- Euryglottis dognini dorsal male
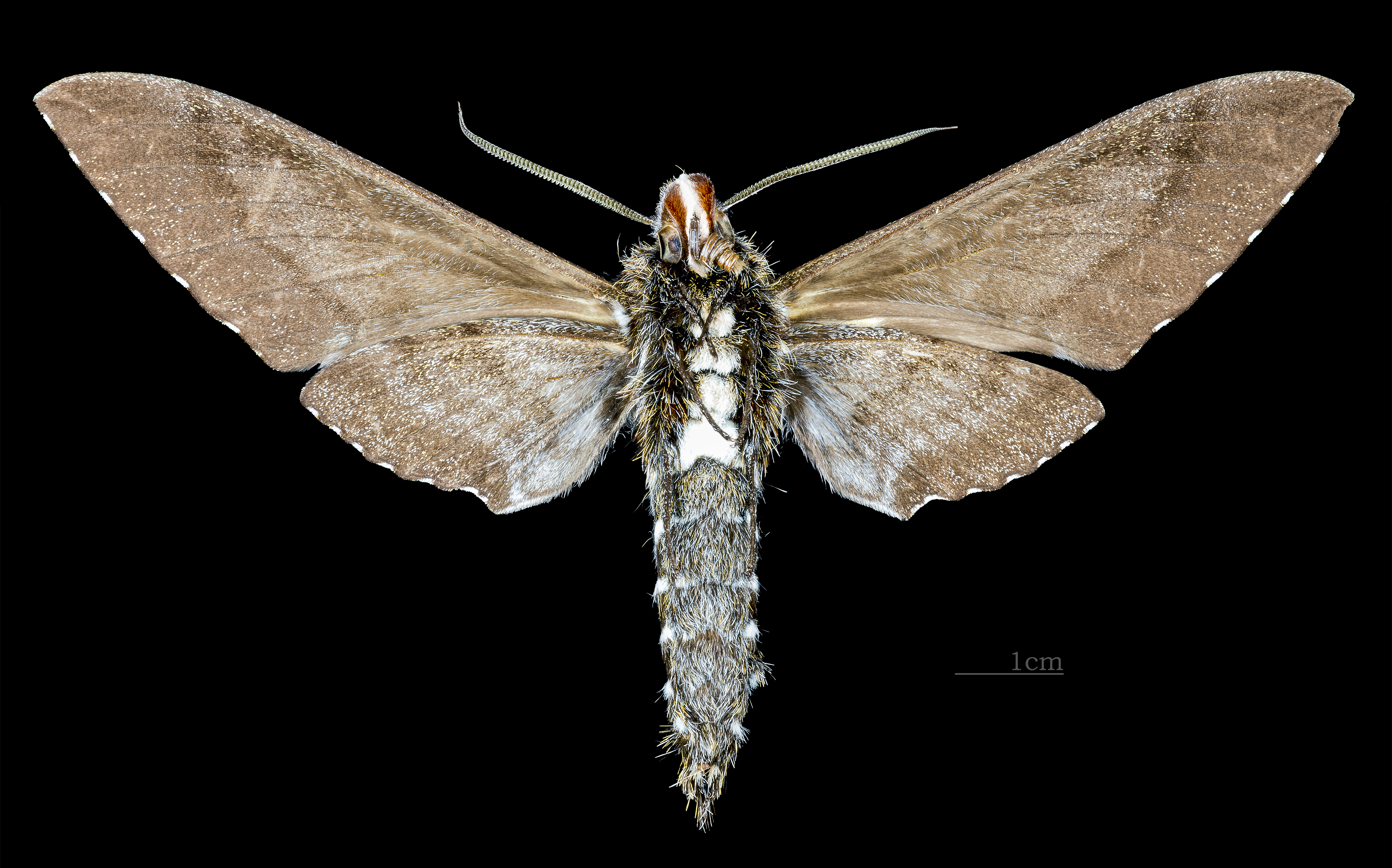
- Euryglottis dognini ventral male

Scientific classification
- Domain: Eukaryota
- Kingdom: Animalia
- Phylum: Arthropoda
- Class: Insecta
- Order: Lepidoptera
- Family: Sphingidae
- Genus: Euryglottis
- Species: E. dognini

Binomial name
- Euryglottis dognini Rothschild, 1896

= Euryglottis dognini =

Species of moth

Euryglottis dognini is a moth of the family Sphingidae.

== Distribution ==
It is known from Colombia, Peru, Bolivia and Venezuela.

== Description ==
The wingspan is about 117 mm. There are three rows of white spots on each side of the abdomen and a large white patch at the base on the abdomen underside.

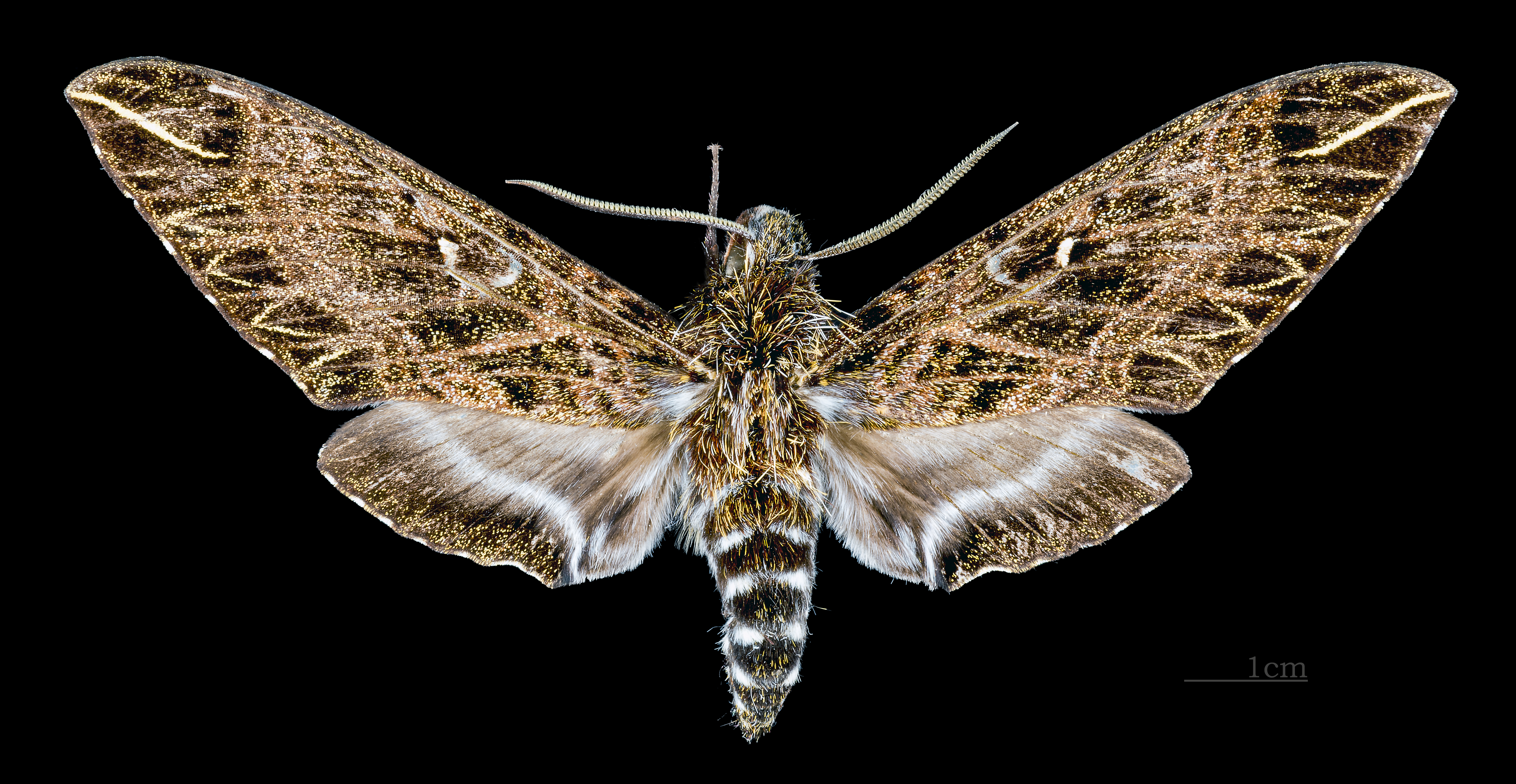
Euryglottis dognini female, dorsal

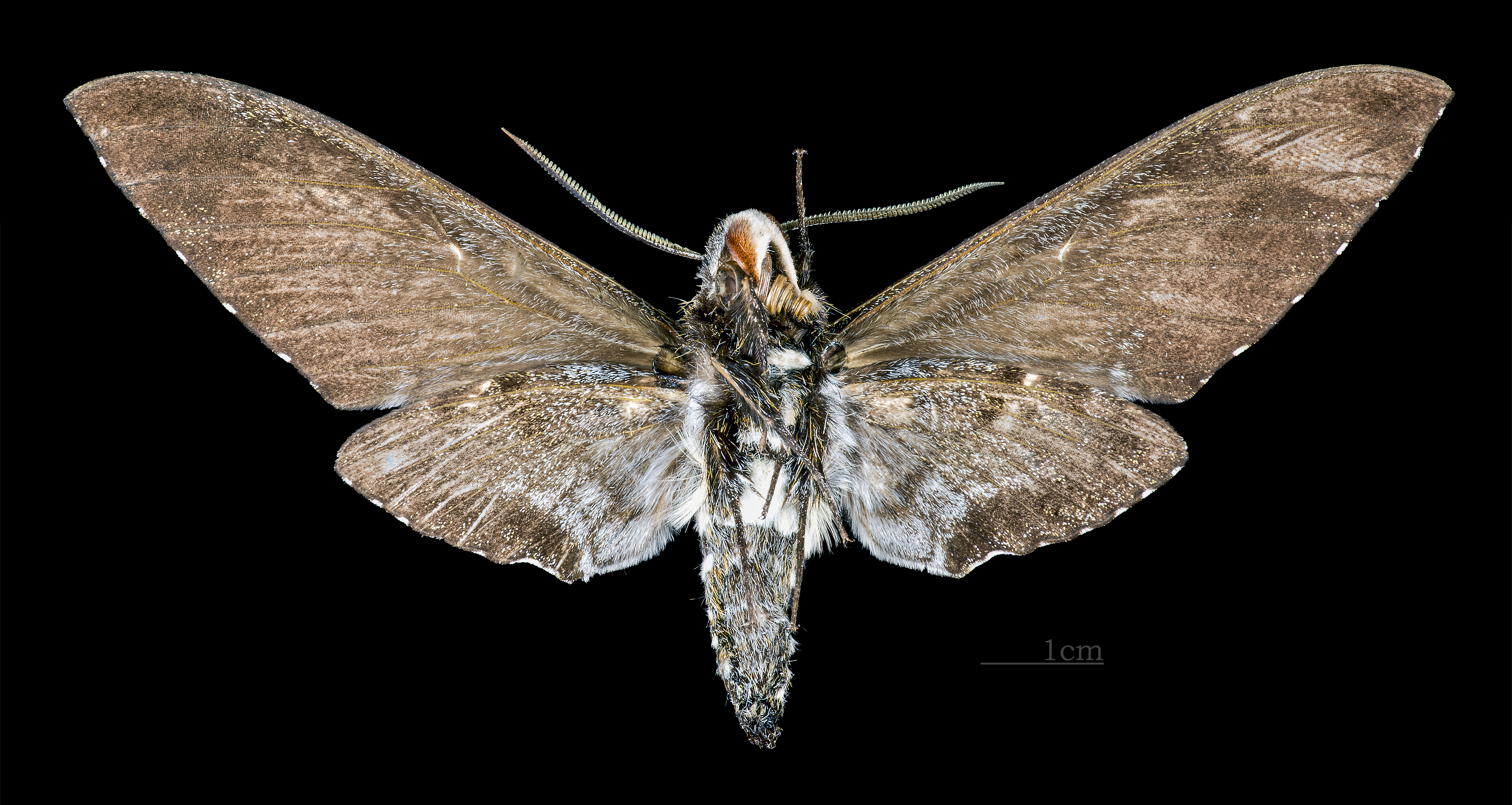
Euryglottis dognini female, ventral

== Biology ==
Adults are on wing in February and August.
