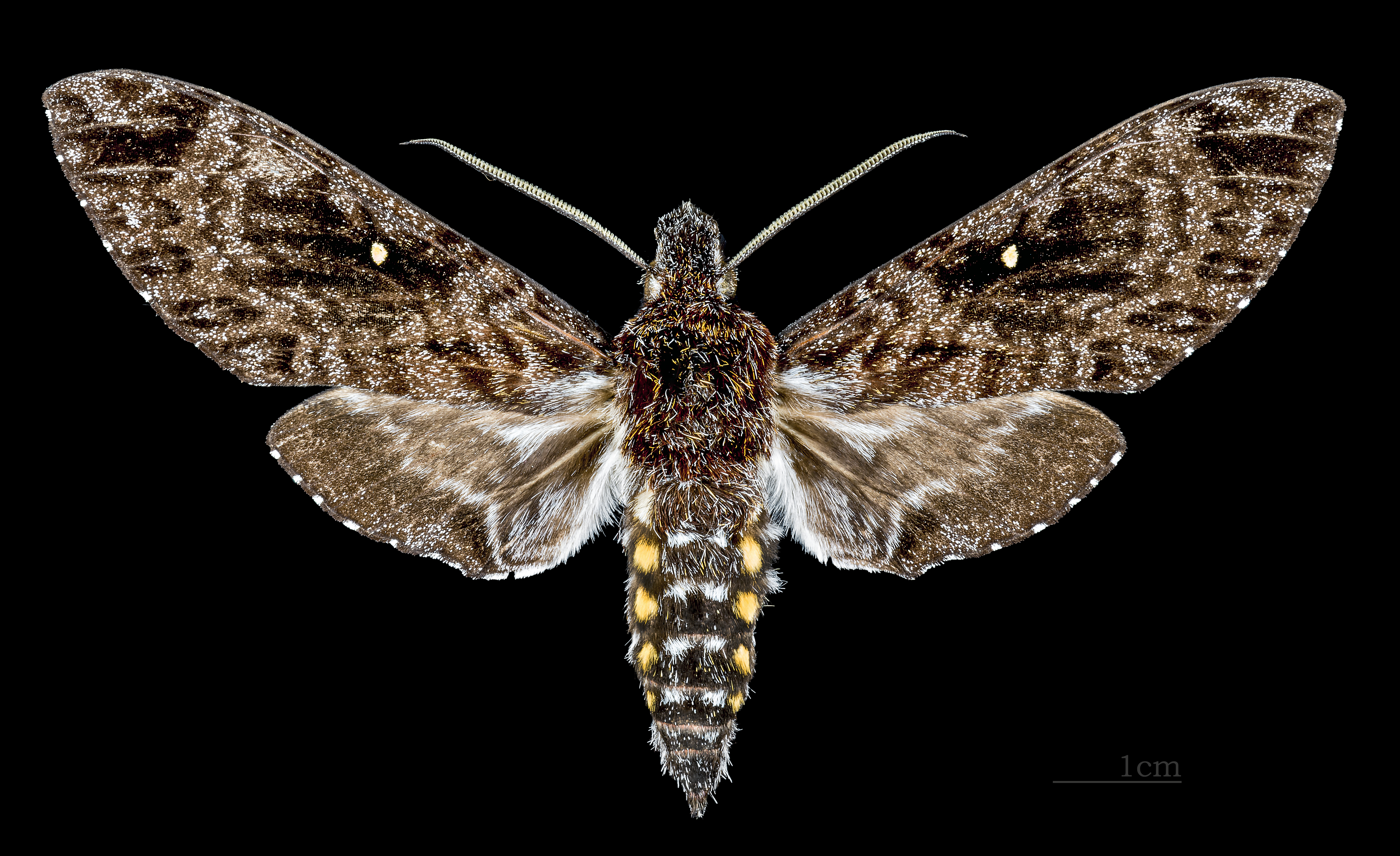
- Male dorsal view
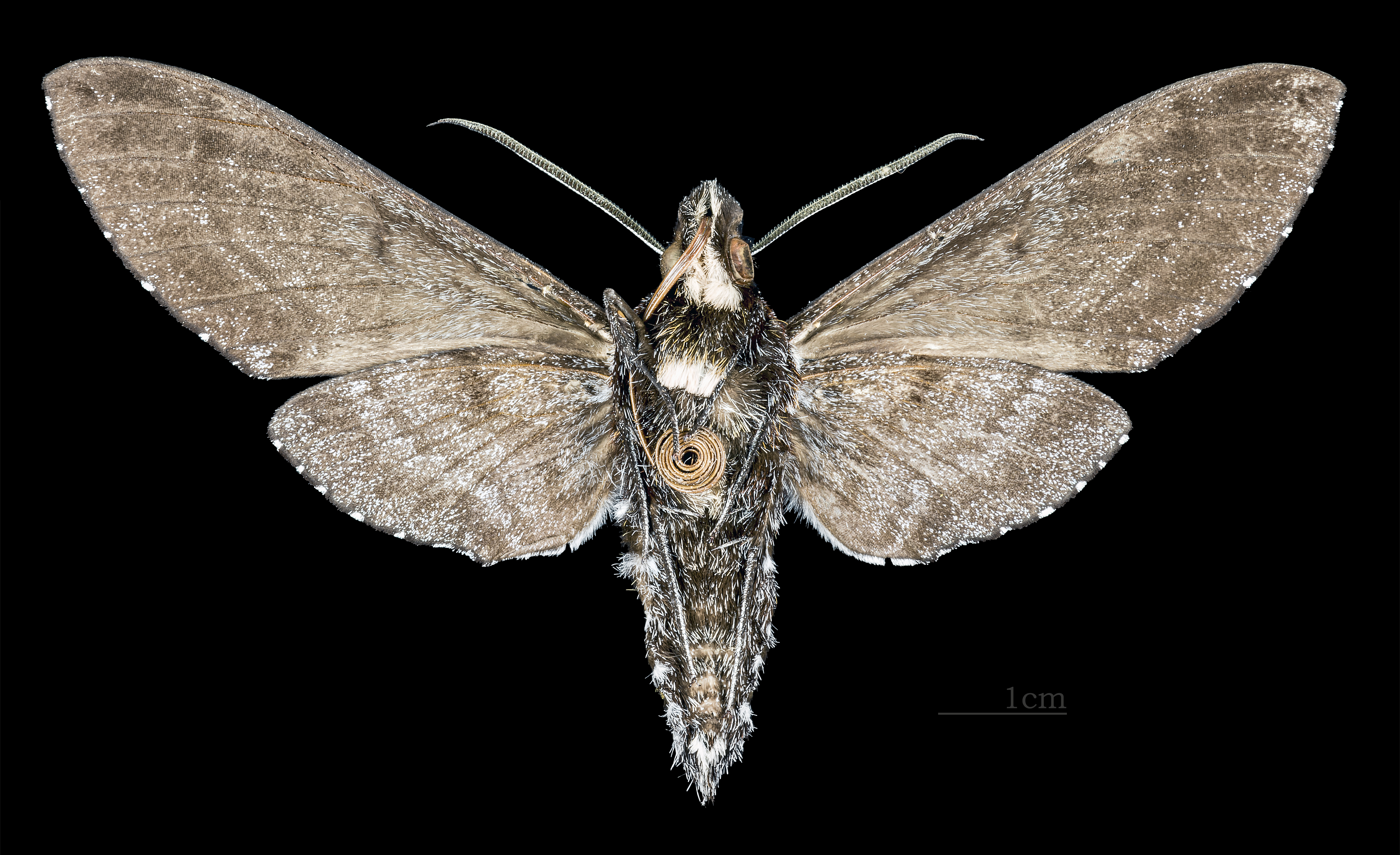
- Male ventral view

Scientific classification
- Domain: Eukaryota
- Kingdom: Animalia
- Phylum: Arthropoda
- Class: Insecta
- Order: Lepidoptera
- Family: Sphingidae
- Genus: Euryglottis
- Species: E. albostigmata

Binomial name
- Euryglottis albostigmata Rothschild, 1895

= Euryglottis albostigmata =

Species of moth

Euryglottis albostigmata is a moth of the family Sphingidae first described by Walter Rothschild in 1895.

== Distribution ==
It is known from Colombia and Peru.

== Description ==
It is very different from other species in the genus Euryglottis, particularly in colour as well as the absence of a pale angle-shaped marking in submarginal area on the forewing upperside. The hindwing upperside of the females is more extensively white than in males.

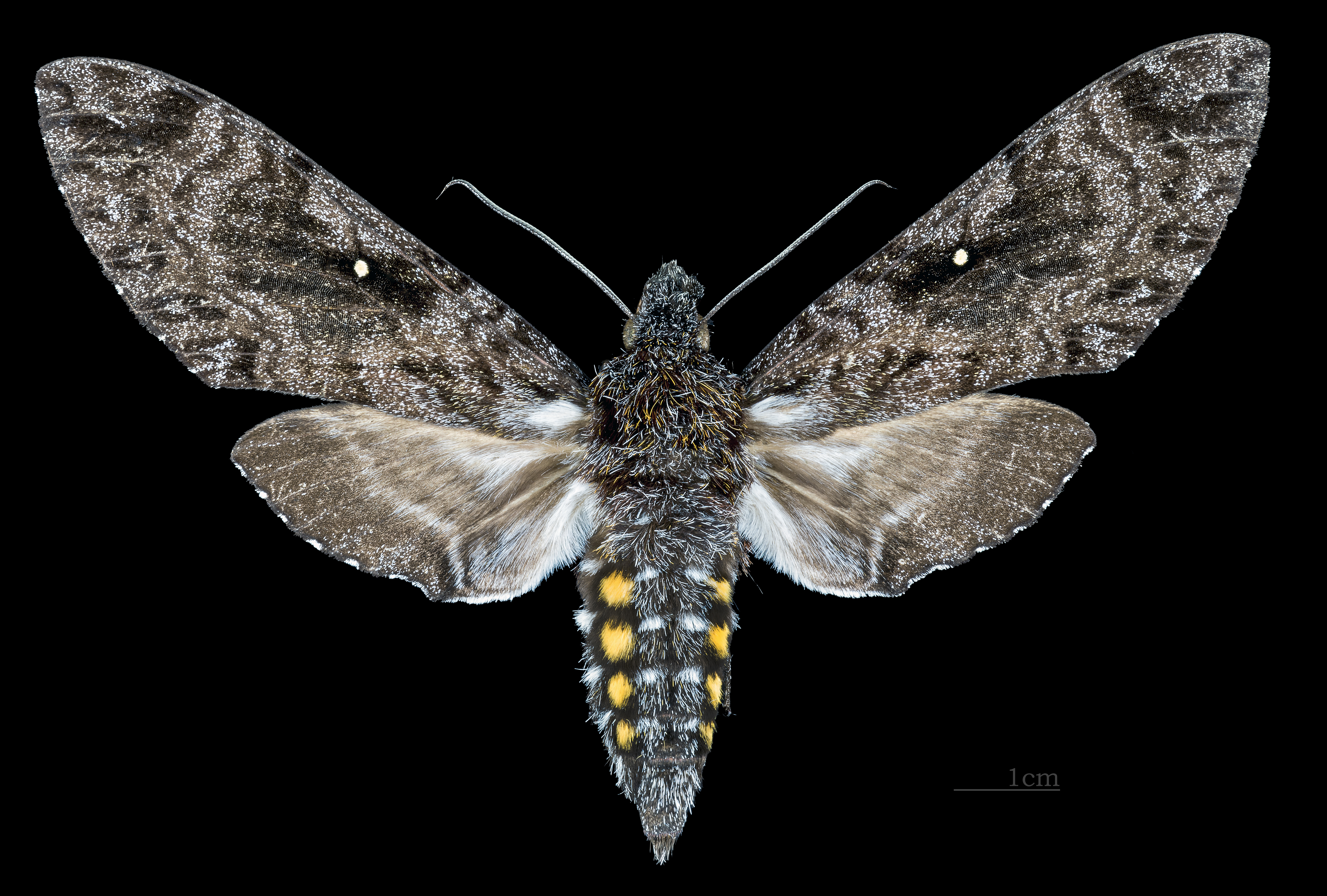
Female

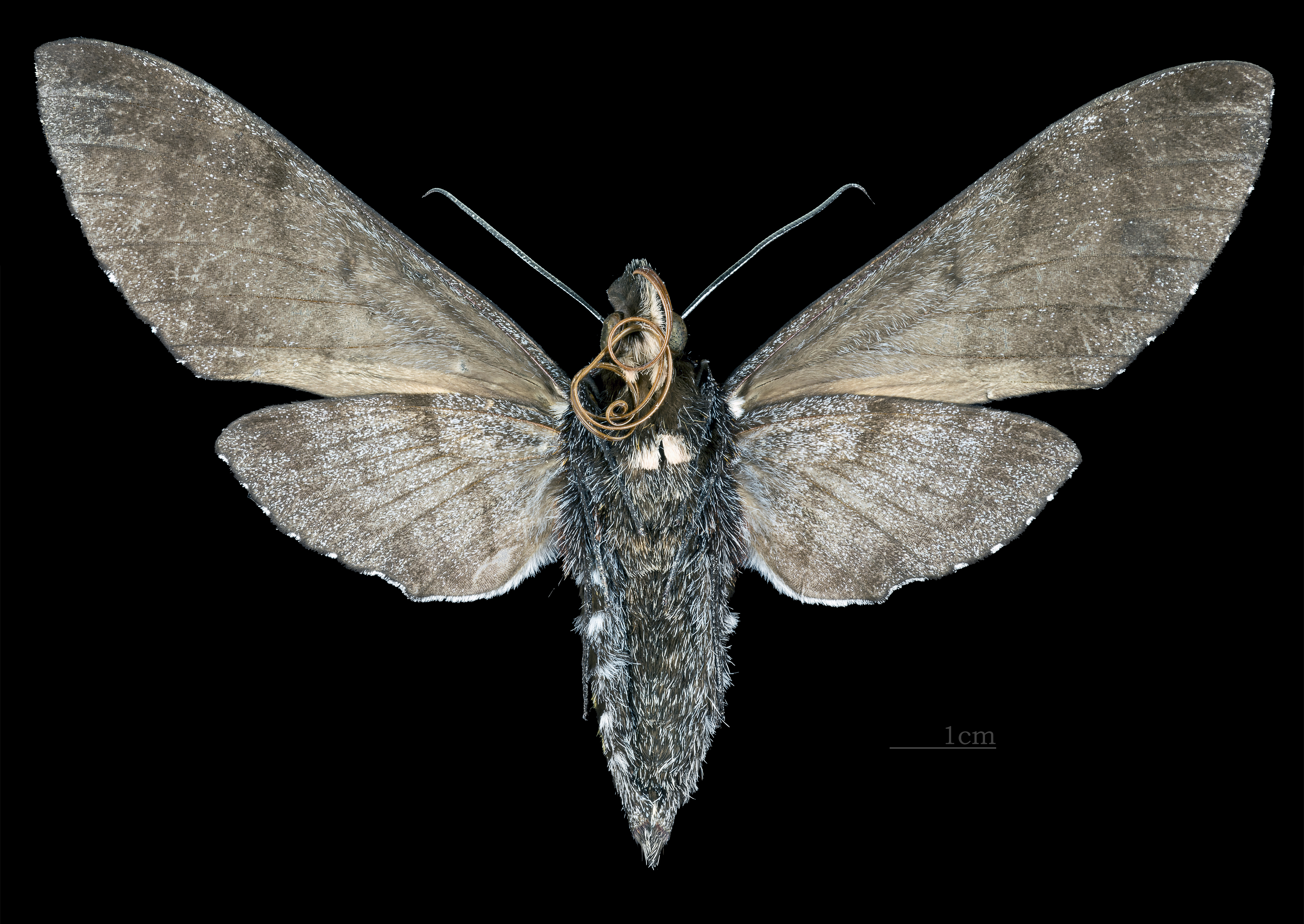
Female underside

== Subspecies ==
- Euryglottis albostigmata albostigmata (Colombia)
- Euryglottis albostigmata basalis Rothschild & Jordan, 1906 (Peru)
