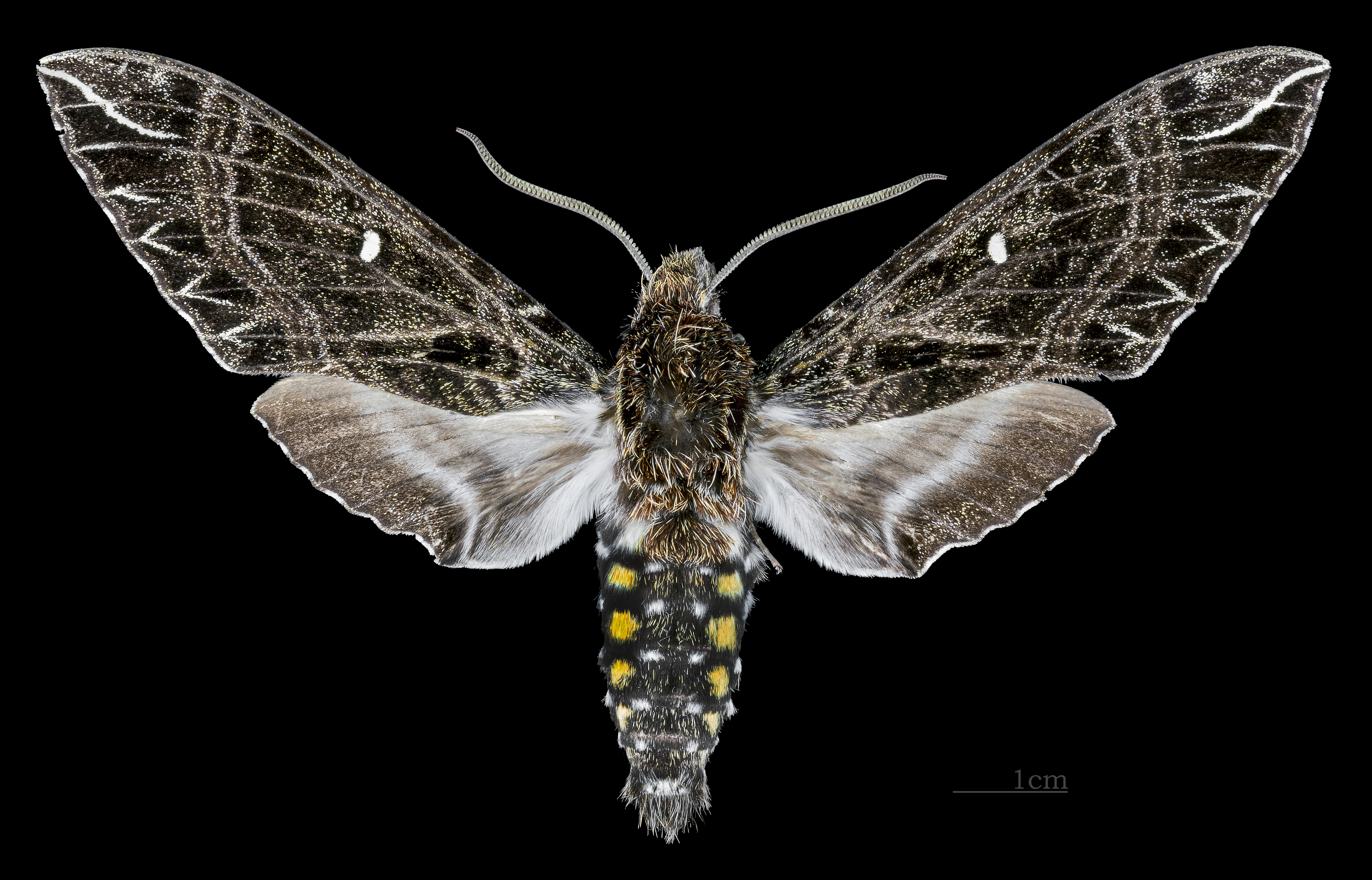
- Euryglottis guttiventris

Scientific classification
- Domain: Eukaryota
- Kingdom: Animalia
- Phylum: Arthropoda
- Class: Insecta
- Order: Lepidoptera
- Family: Sphingidae
- Tribe: Sphingini
- Genus: Euryglottis; Boisduval, [1875]

= Euryglottis =

Genus of moths

Euryglottis is a genus of moths in the family Sphingidae. The genus was erected by Jean Baptiste Boisduval in 1875.

== Species ==
- Euryglottis albostigmata Rothschild 1895
- Euryglottis aper (Walker 1856)
- Euryglottis davidianus Dognin 1891
- Euryglottis dognini Rothschild 1896
- Euryglottis guttiventris (Rothschild & Jordan 1903)
- Euryglottis johannes Eitschberger 1998
- Euryglottis oliver Eitschberger 1998

== Gallery ==
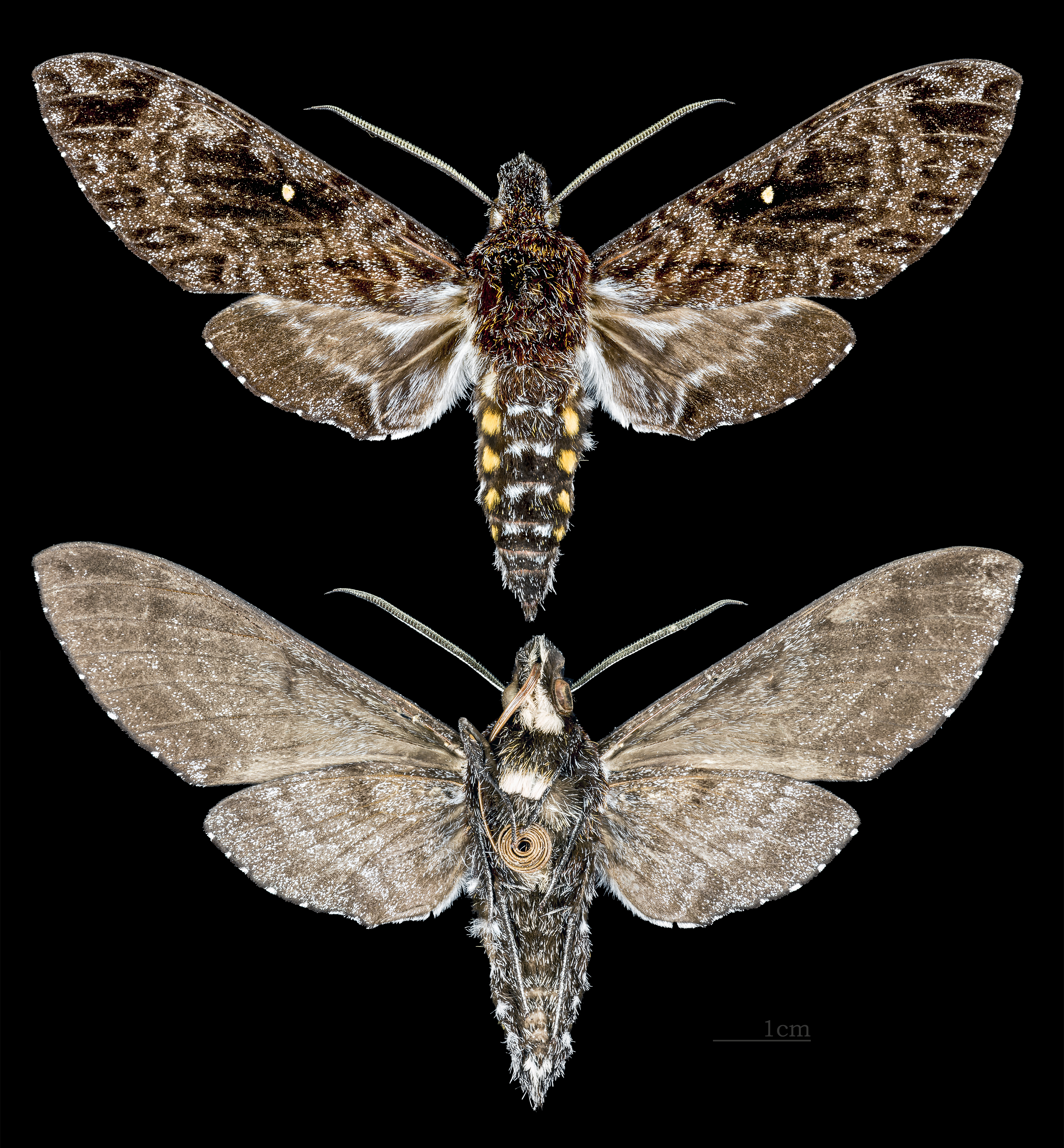
Euryglottis albostigmata

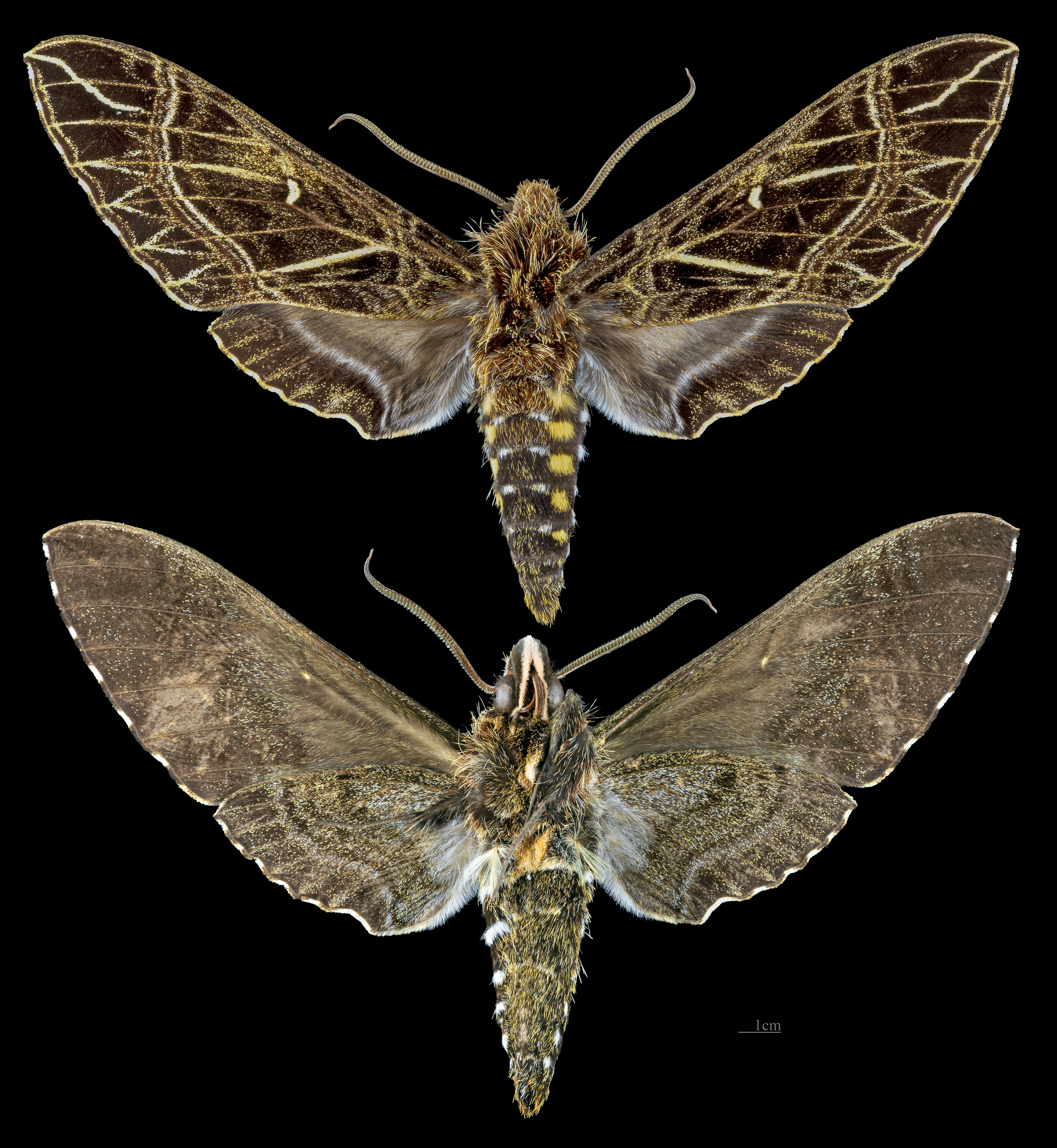
Euryglottis aper

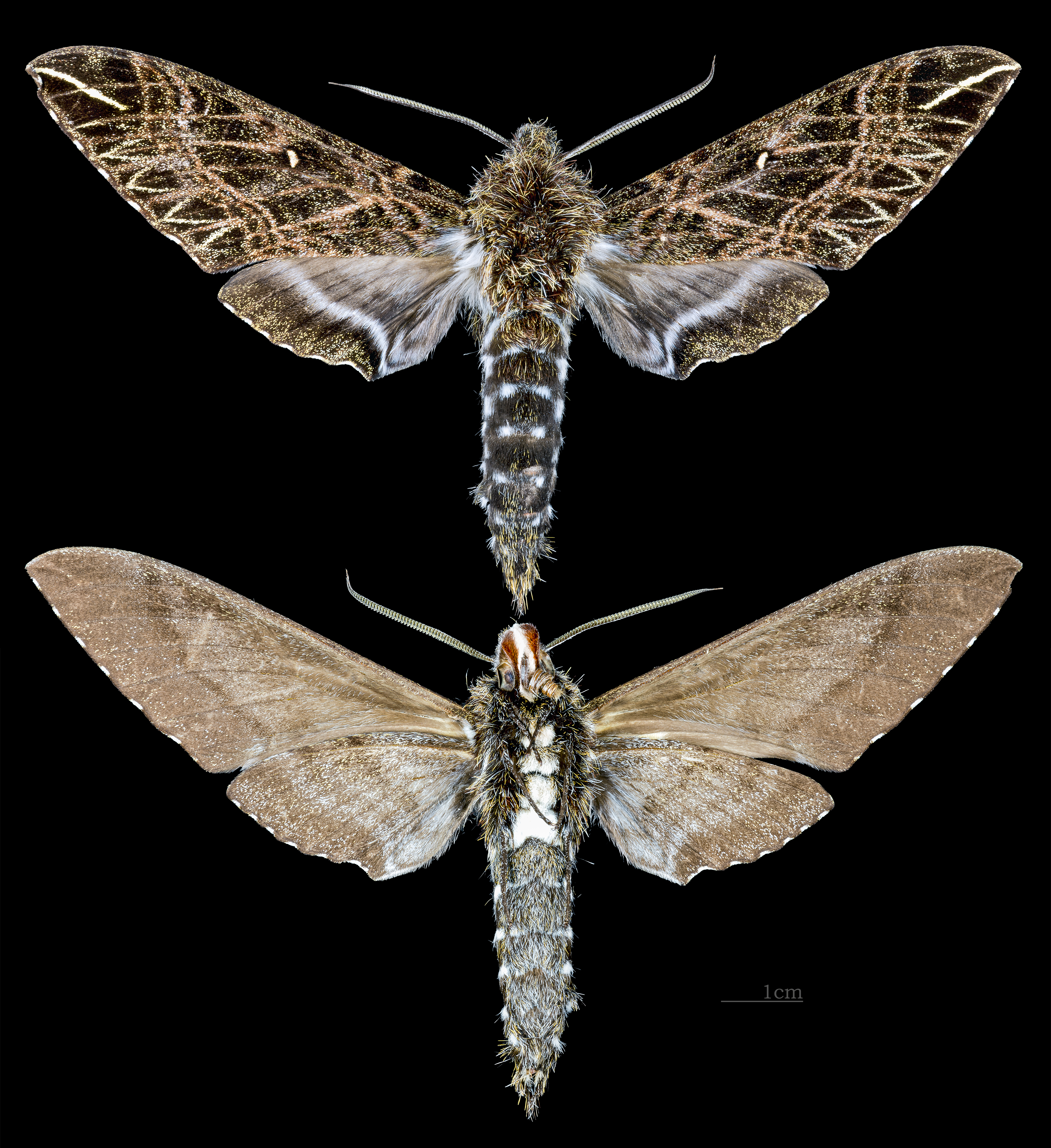
Euryglottis dognini

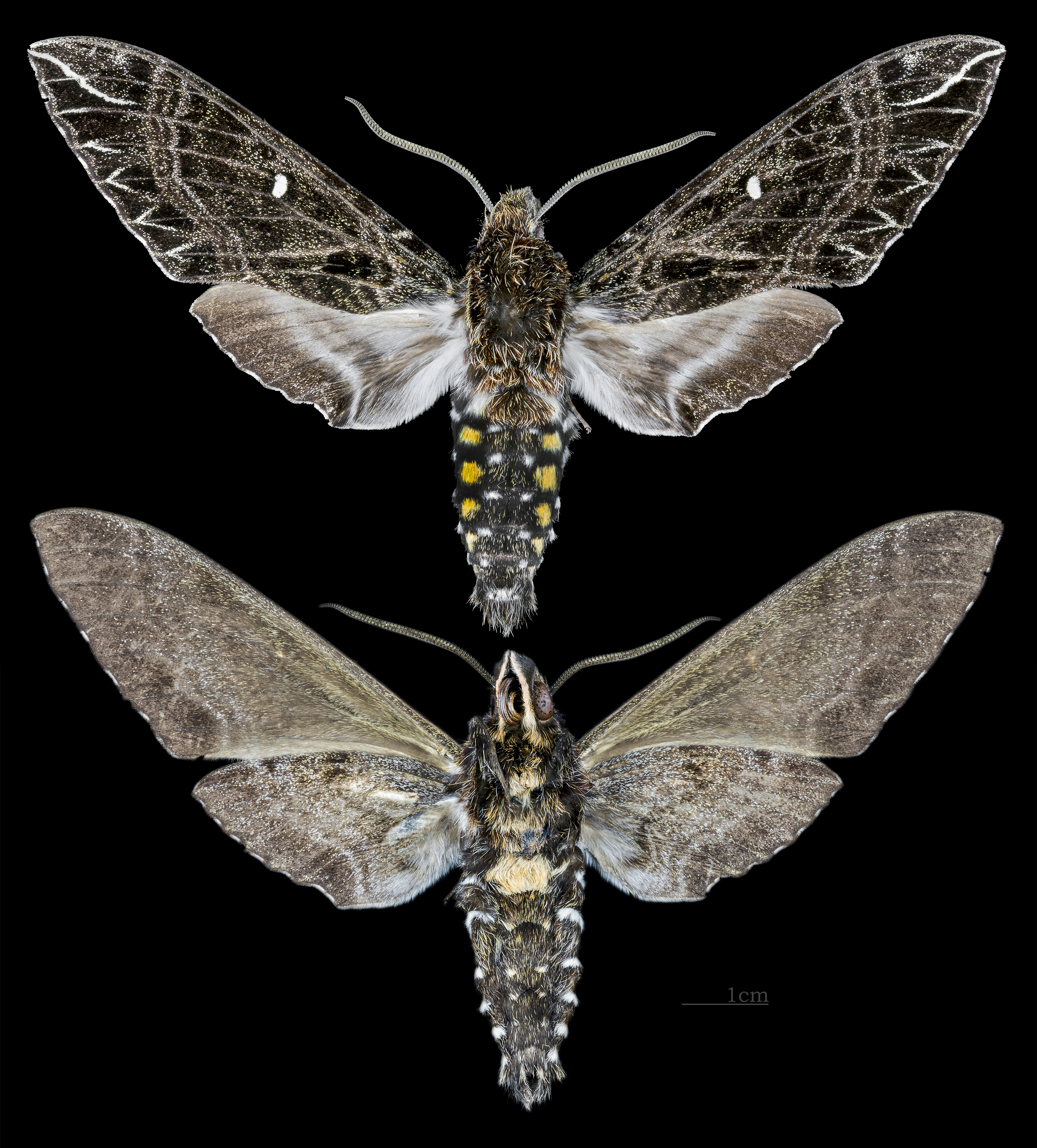
Euryglottis guttiventris
