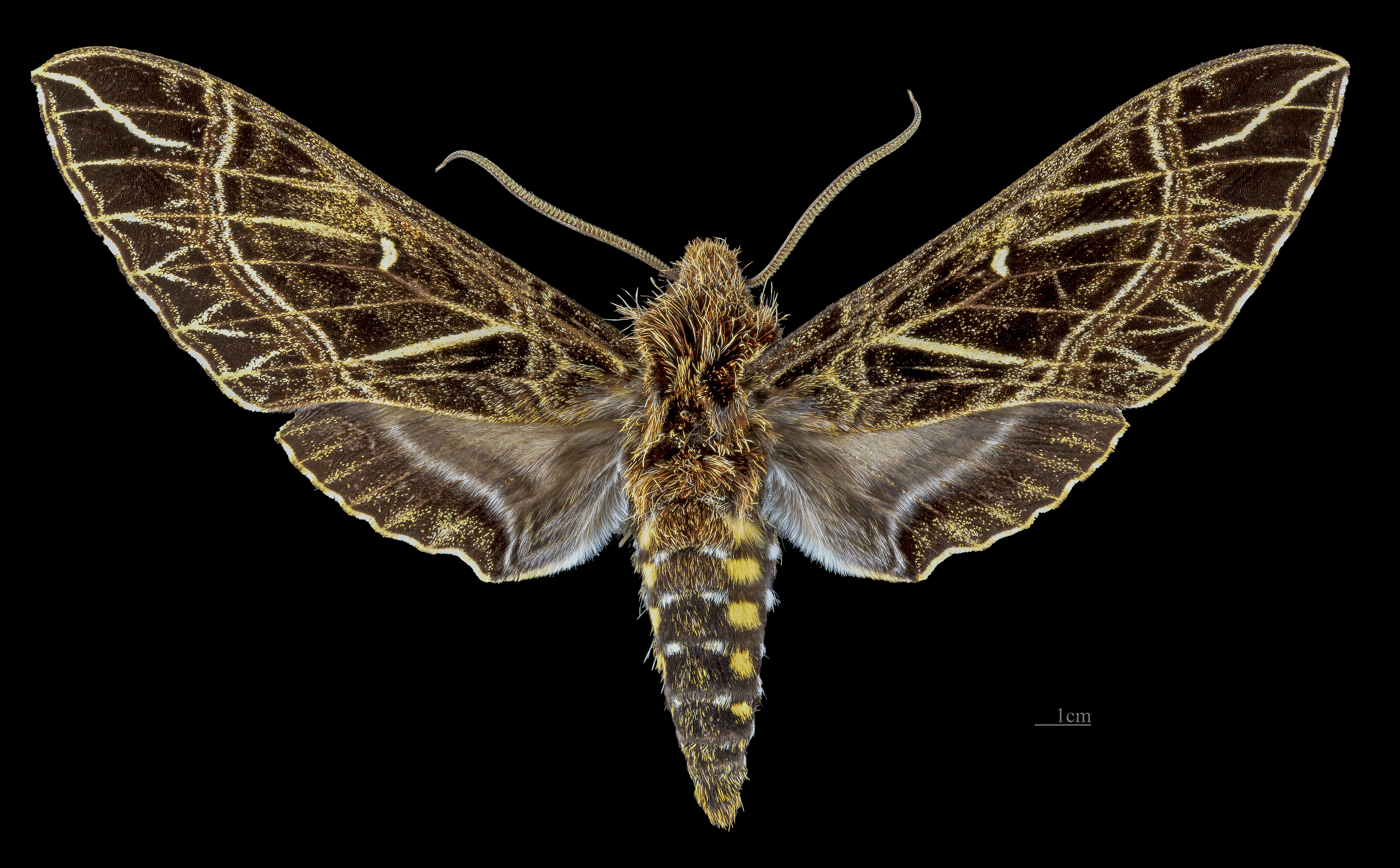
- Male dorsal
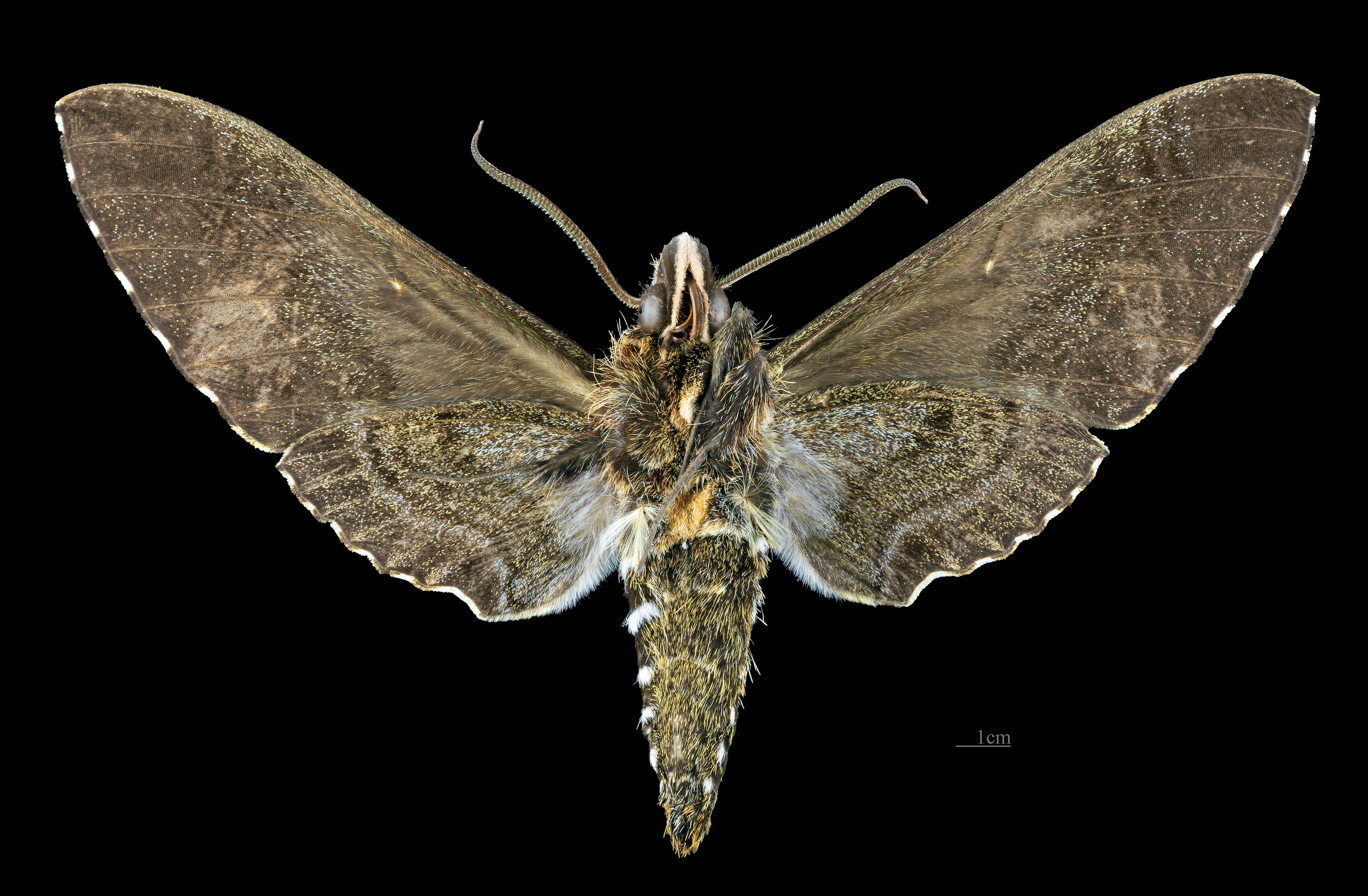
- male ventral

Scientific classification
- Domain: Eukaryota
- Kingdom: Animalia
- Phylum: Arthropoda
- Class: Insecta
- Order: Lepidoptera
- Family: Sphingidae
- Genus: Euryglottis
- Species: E. aper

Binomial name
- Euryglottis aper (Walker, 1856)

Synonyms
- Macrosila aper Walker, 1856; Sphinx aper Herrich-Schäffer, 1856

= Euryglottis aper =

Species of moth

Euryglottis aper is a moth of the family Sphingidae.

== Distribution ==
It is known from Colombia, Ecuador, Venezuela and Bolivia.

== Description ==
There are rather indistinct apical dots on sternites three to five and three lines forming a well-marked discal band on the forewing upperside.

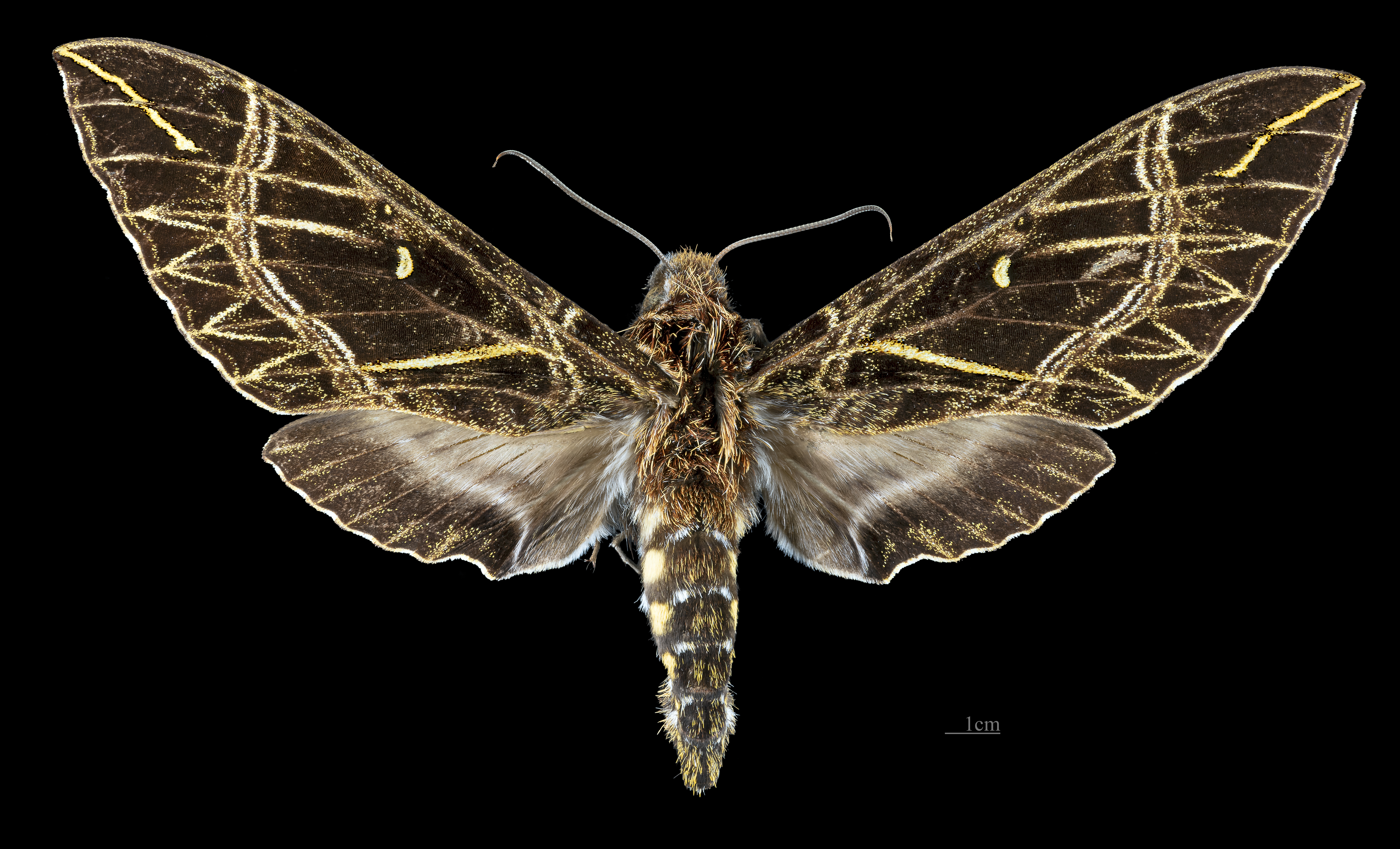
Female dorsal

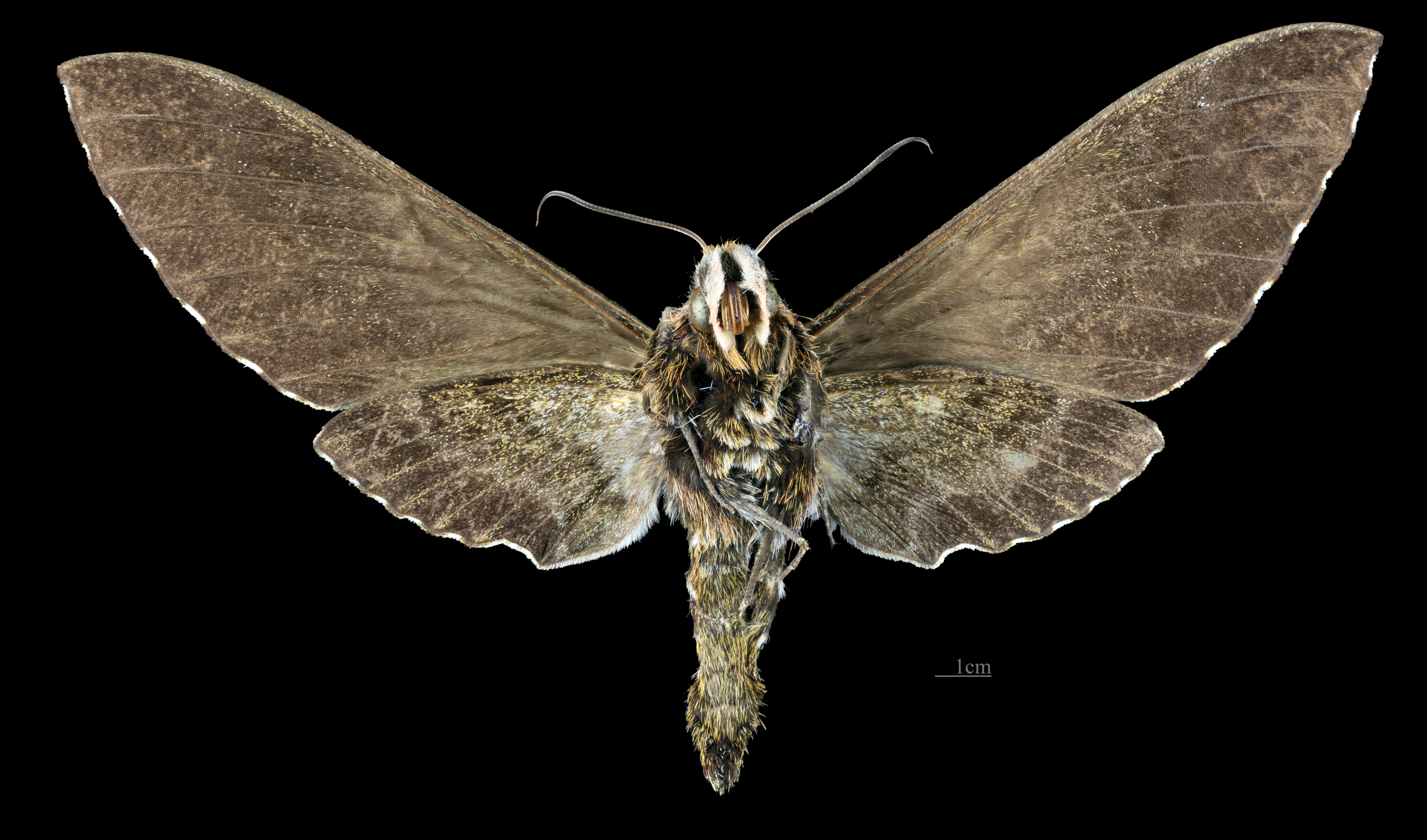
Female ventral
