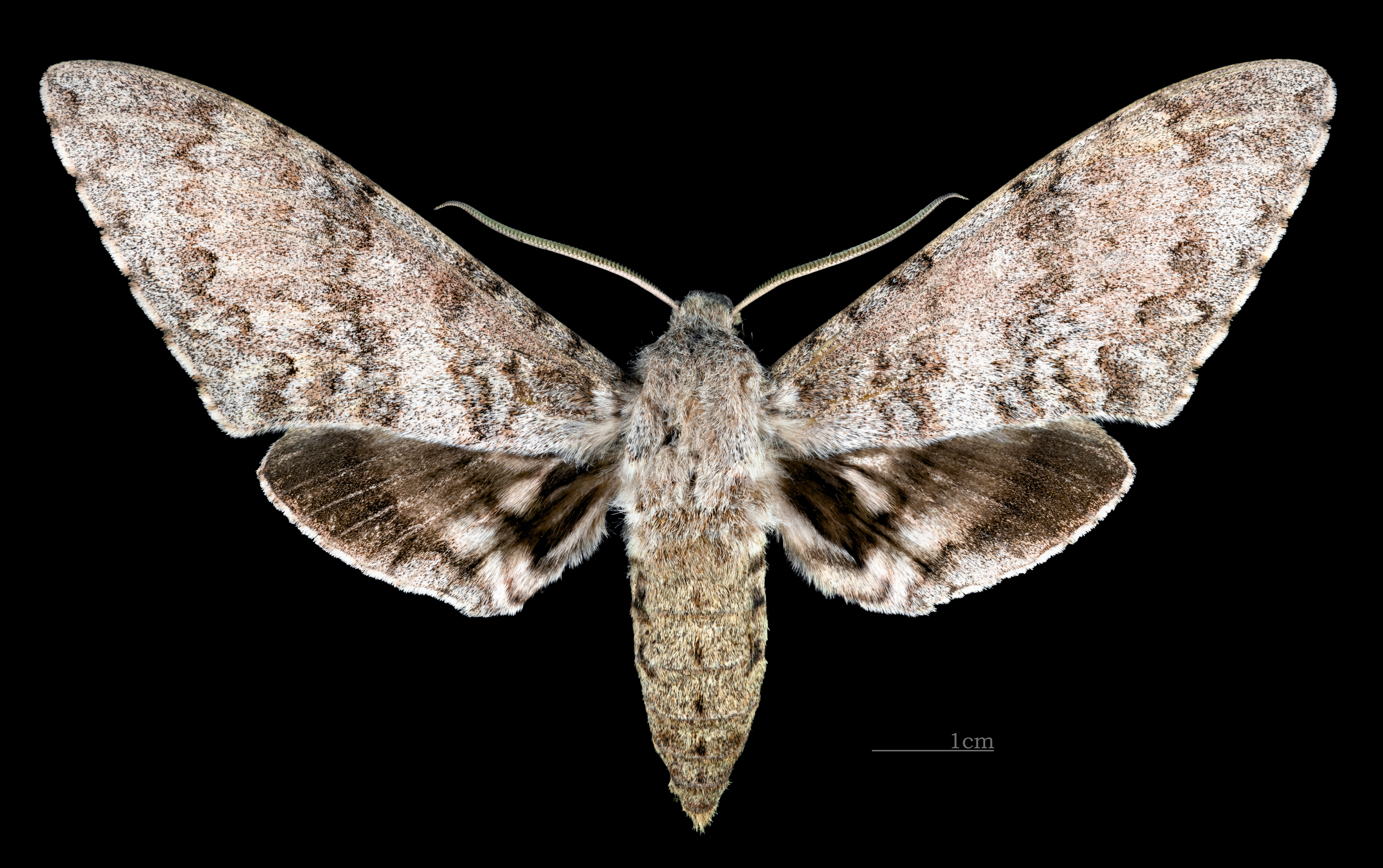
- Male dorsal
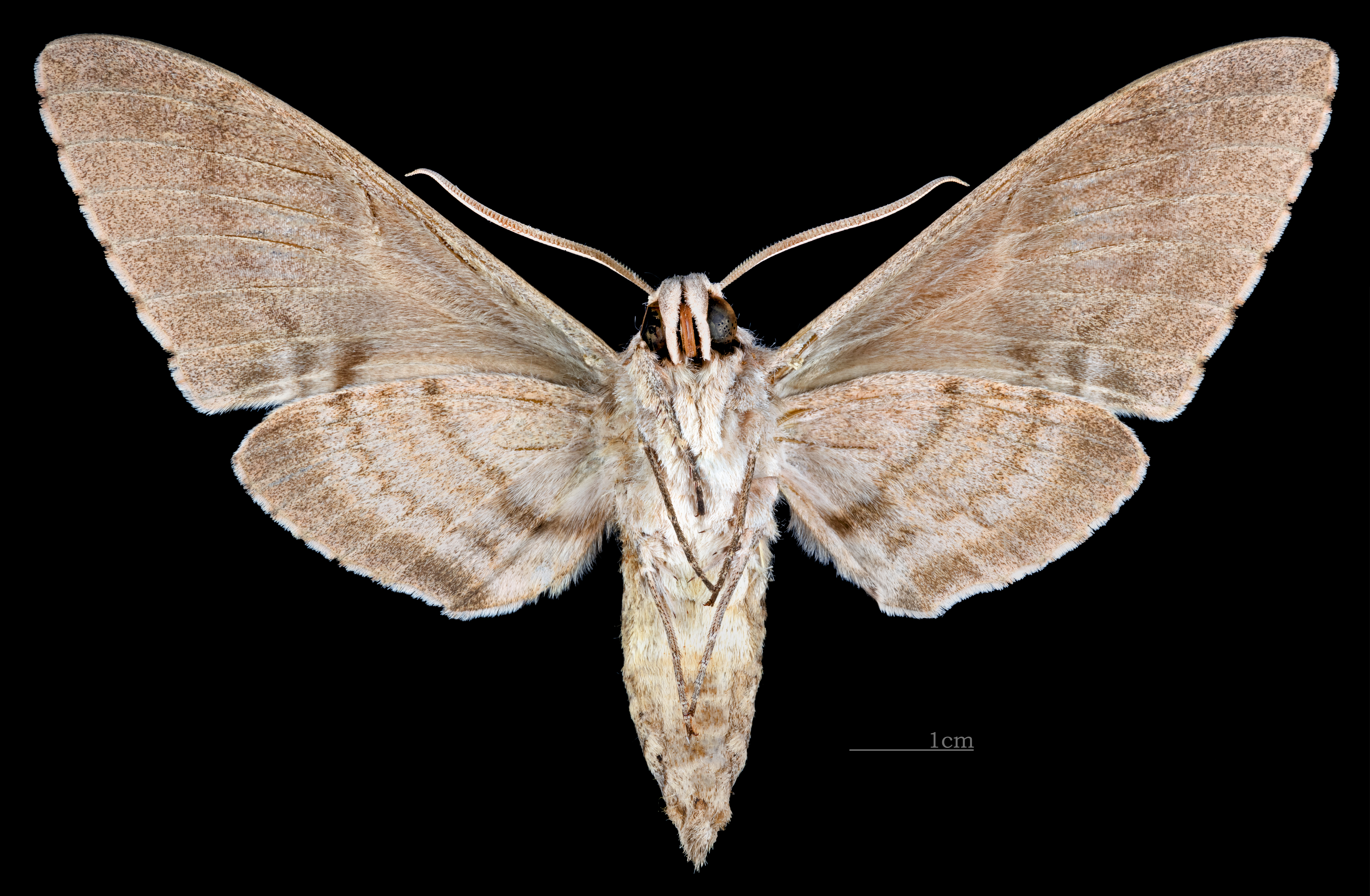
- Male ventral

Scientific classification
- Kingdom: Animalia
- Phylum: Arthropoda
- Class: Insecta
- Order: Lepidoptera
- Family: Sphingidae
- Genus: Manduca
- Species: M. bergi

Binomial name
- Manduca bergi (Rothschild & Jordan, 1903)

Synonyms
- Protoparce bergi Rothschild & Jordan, 1903

= Manduca bergi =

Species of moth

Manduca bergi is a moth of the family Sphingidae first described by Walter Rothschild and Karl Jordan in 1903.

== Distribution ==
It is found in Argentina and Bolivia.

== Description ==
The wingspan is about 83 mm. The body and wings are greyish creamy buff, dusted with brown and ochreous scales. The head and thorax are without markings, but there are small black lateral patches on the abdomen. The underside of both wings is slightly pinkish. The forewing underside is much more shaded with brown than the upperside. The hindwing upperside is blackish brown.

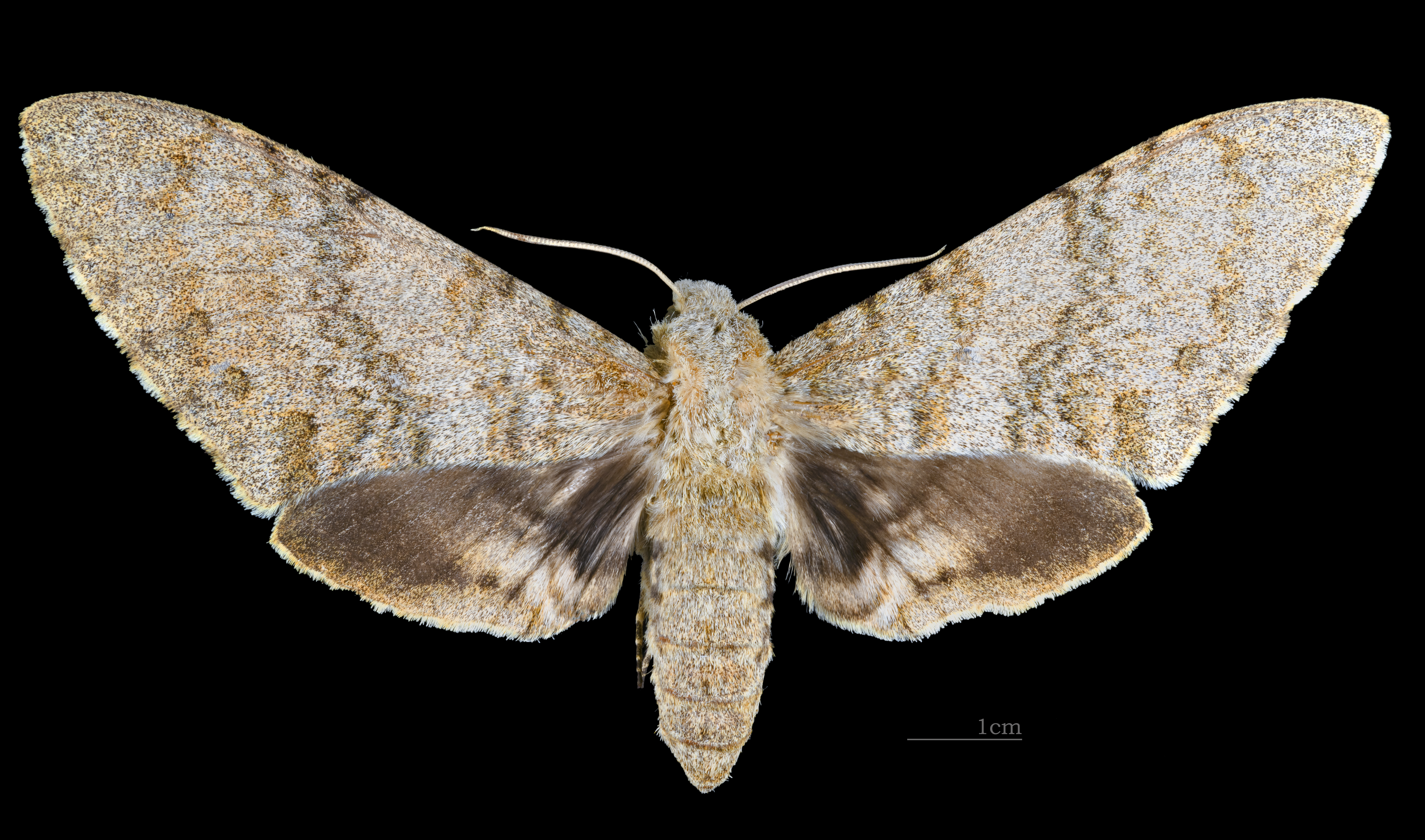
Female dorsal

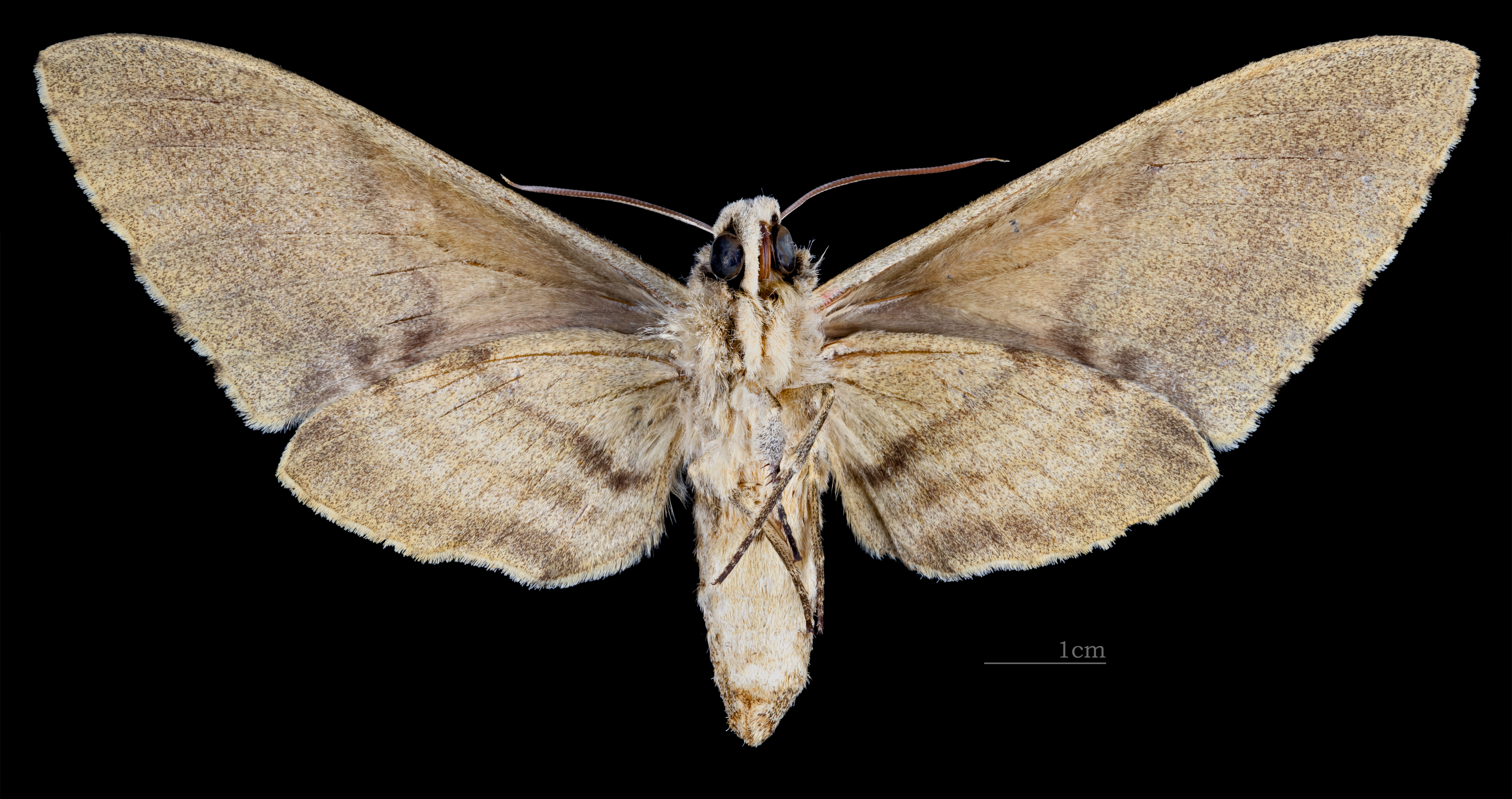
Female ventral

== Biology ==
Adults are on wing from January to February, in April, September and November.
