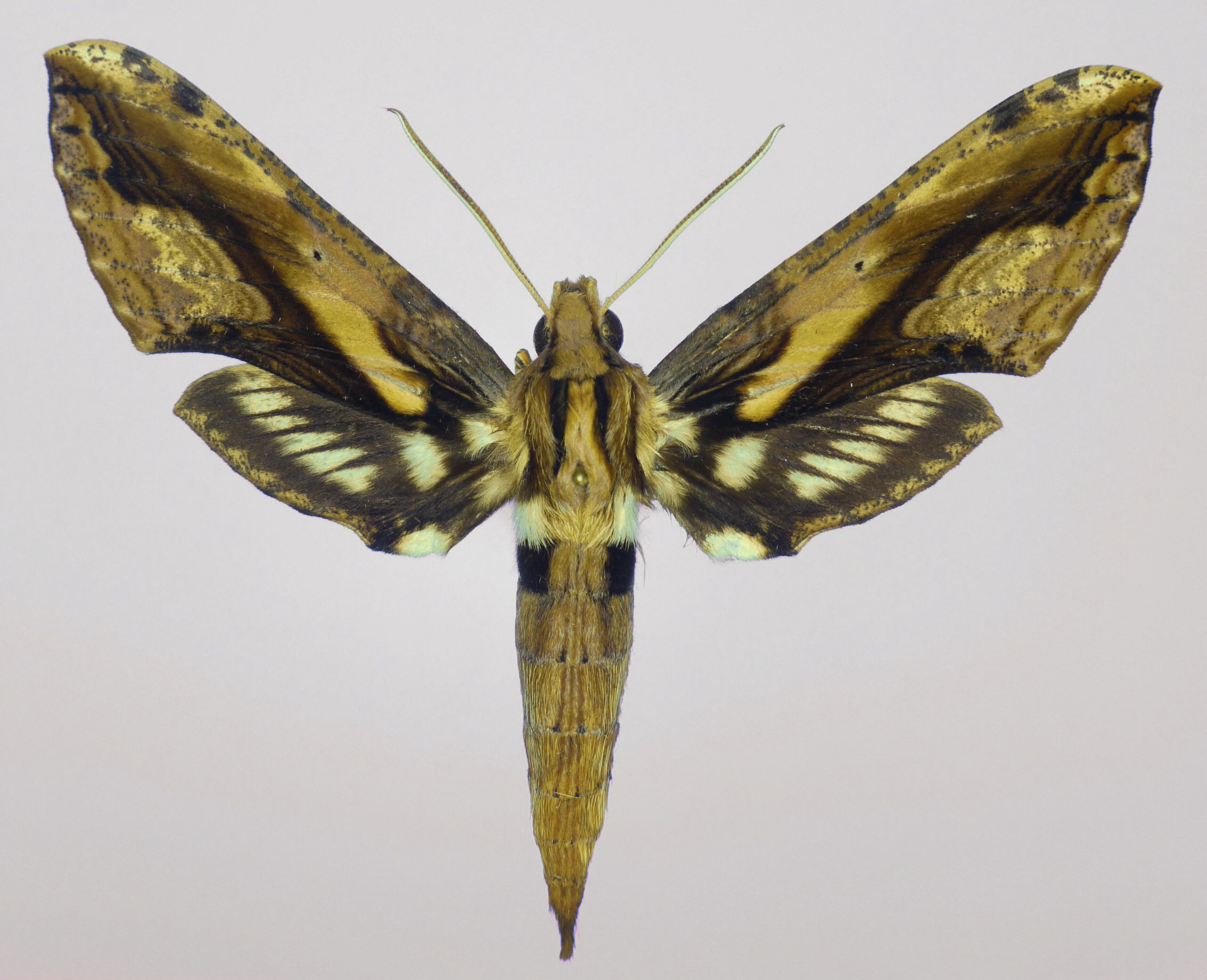

Scientific classification
- Domain: Eukaryota
- Kingdom: Animalia
- Phylum: Arthropoda
- Class: Insecta
- Order: Lepidoptera
- Family: Sphingidae
- Genus: Xylophanes
- Species: X. lamontagnei

Binomial name
- Xylophanes lamontagnei Vaglia & Haxaire, 2007

= Xylophanes lamontagnei =

Species of moth

Xylophanes lamontagnei is a moth of the family Sphingidae. It is known from Venezuela, Ecuador and Peru.
