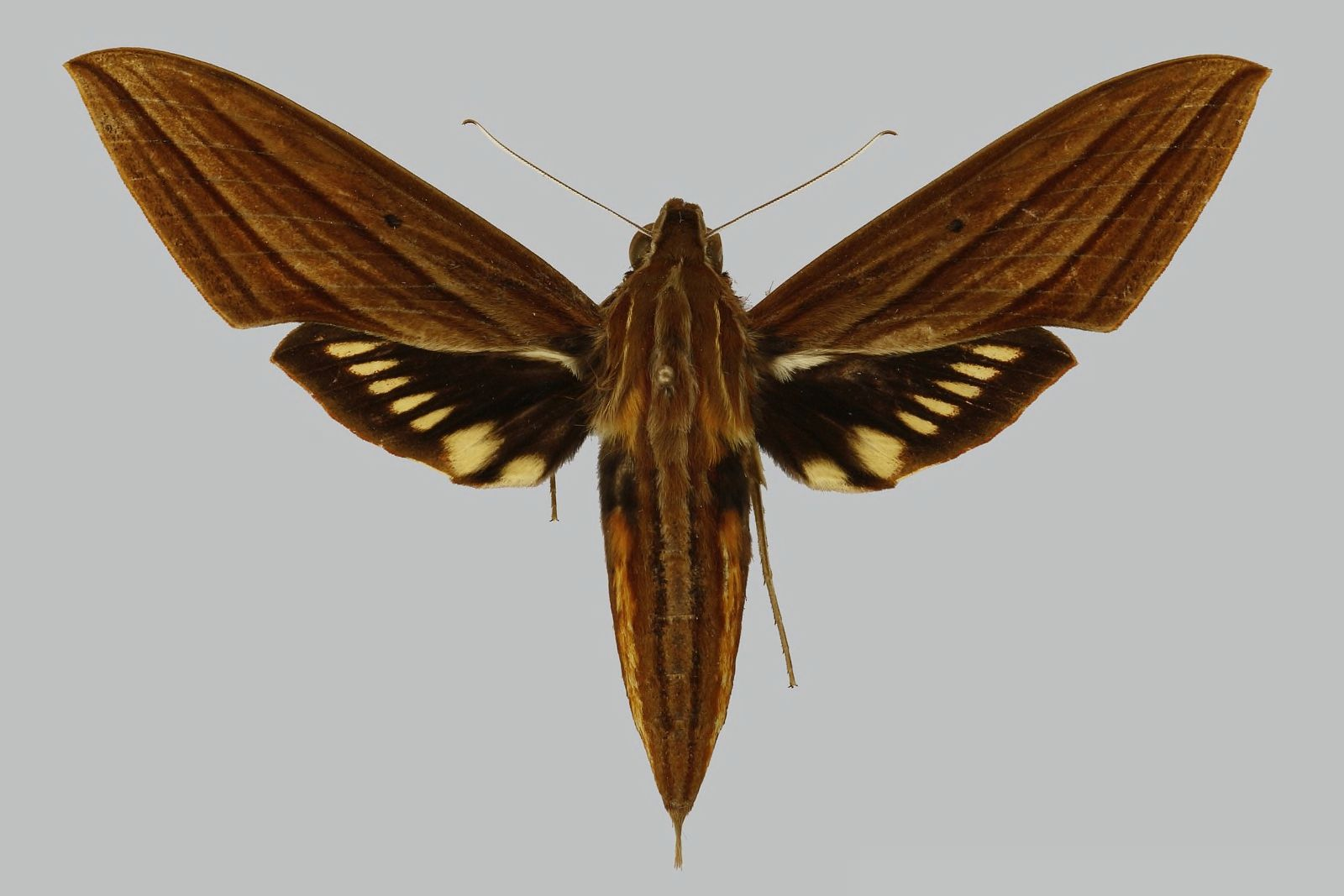

Scientific classification
- Kingdom: Animalia
- Phylum: Arthropoda
- Clade: Pancrustacea
- Class: Insecta
- Order: Lepidoptera
- Family: Sphingidae
- Genus: Xylophanes
- Species: X. kiefferi

Binomial name
- Xylophanes kiefferi Cadiou, 1995

= Xylophanes kiefferi =

Species of moth

Xylophanes kiefferi is a species of moth in the family Sphingidae. It is known from Colombia.

== Description ==
Adults are probably on wing year-round.

The larvae probably feed on Rubiaceae and Malvaceae species.
