= Macroglossum incredibile =

Scientific classification
- Kingdom: Animalia
- Phylum: Arthropoda
- Class: Insecta
- Order: Lepidoptera
- Family: Sphingidae
- Genus: Macroglossum
- Species: M. incredibile

Binomial name
- Macroglossum incredibile Eitschberger, 2006

Species of moth

Macroglossum incredibile is a moth of the family Sphingidae.
