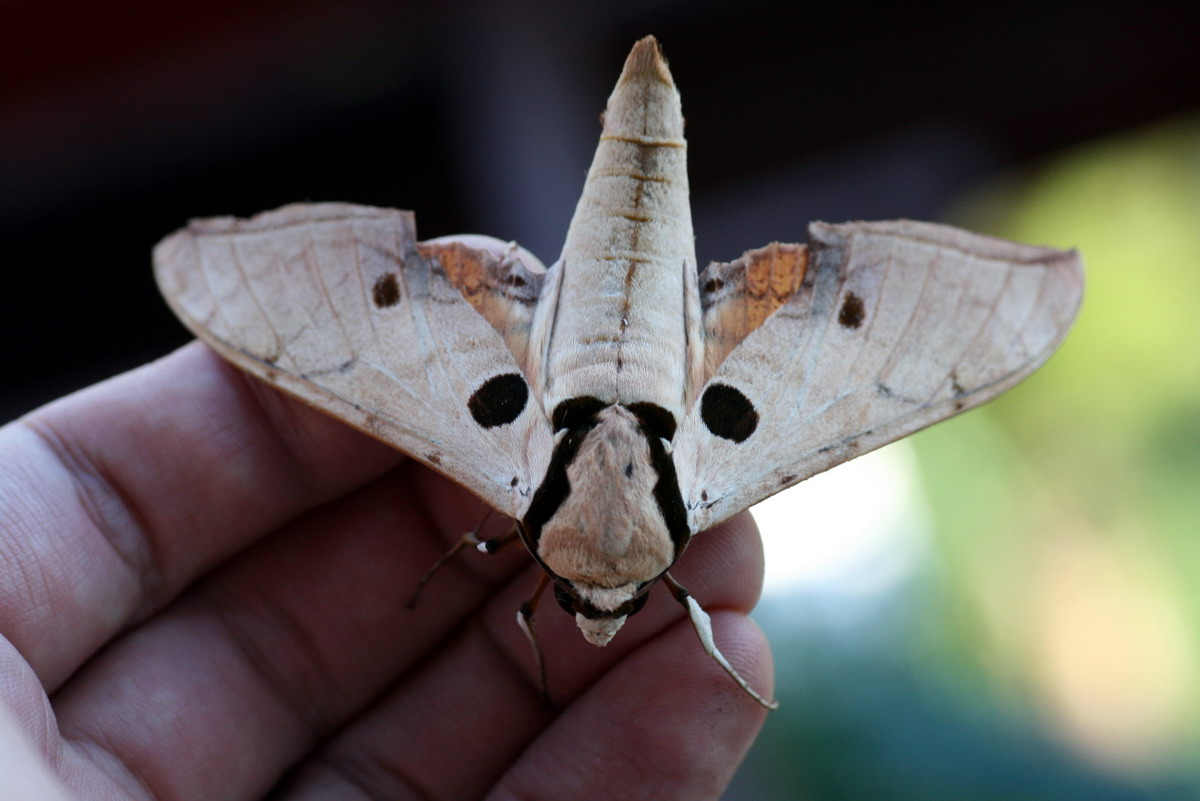

Scientific classification
- Kingdom: Animalia
- Phylum: Arthropoda
- Class: Insecta
- Order: Lepidoptera
- Family: Sphingidae
- Genus: Ambulyx
- Species: A. obliterata

Binomial name
- Ambulyx obliterata Rothschild, 1920

Synonyms
- Ambulyx liturata obliterata Rothschild, 1920; Oxyambulyx macromaculata Gehlen, 1940; Oxyambulyx obliterata Rothschild; Diehl, 1980

= Ambulyx obliterata =

Species of moth

Ambulyx obliterata is a moth of the family Sphingidae first described by Walter Rothschild in 1920.

== Distribution ==
It is found in Sumatra, Peninsular Malaysia and Borneo.

== Description ==
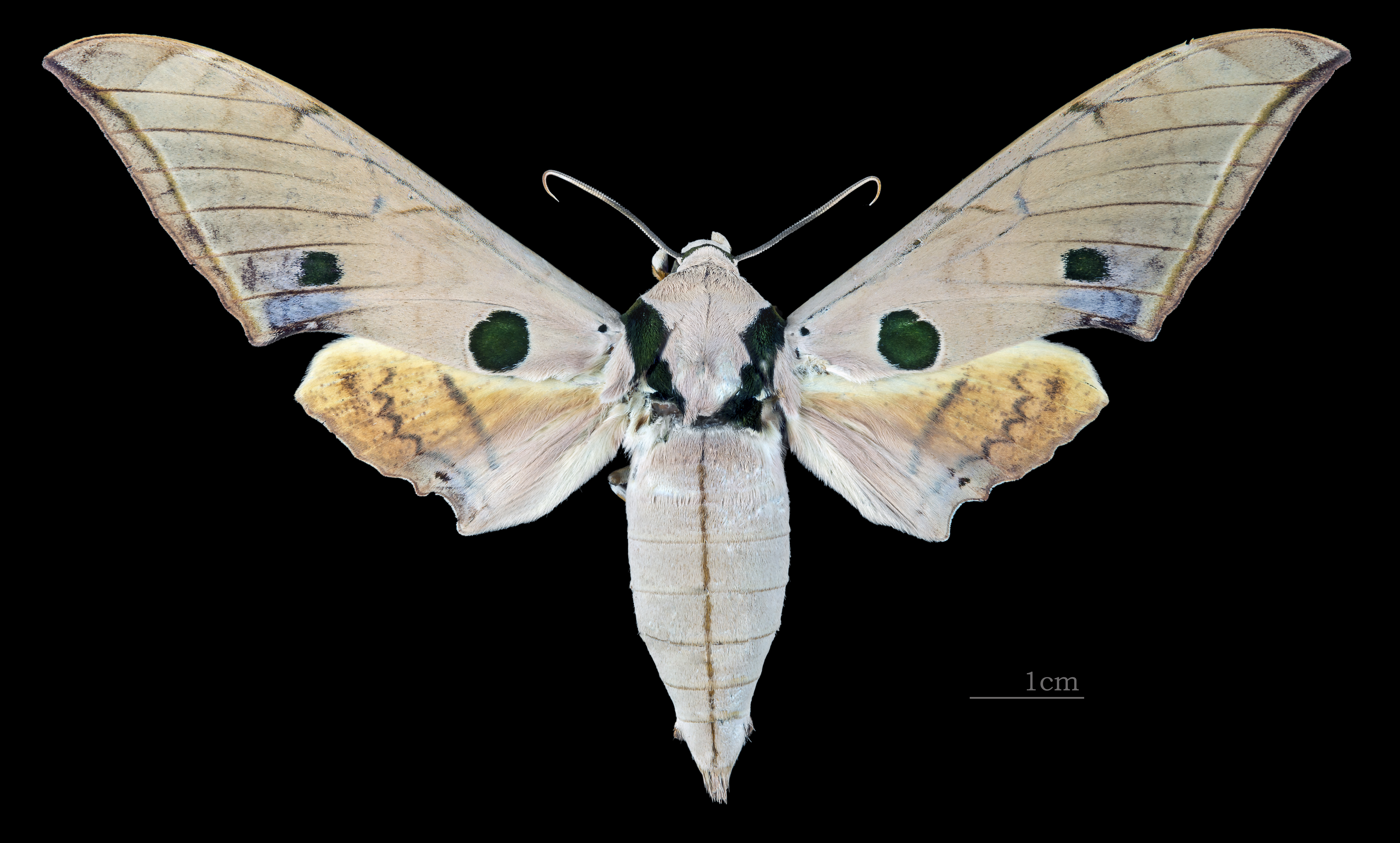
Male, dorsal view

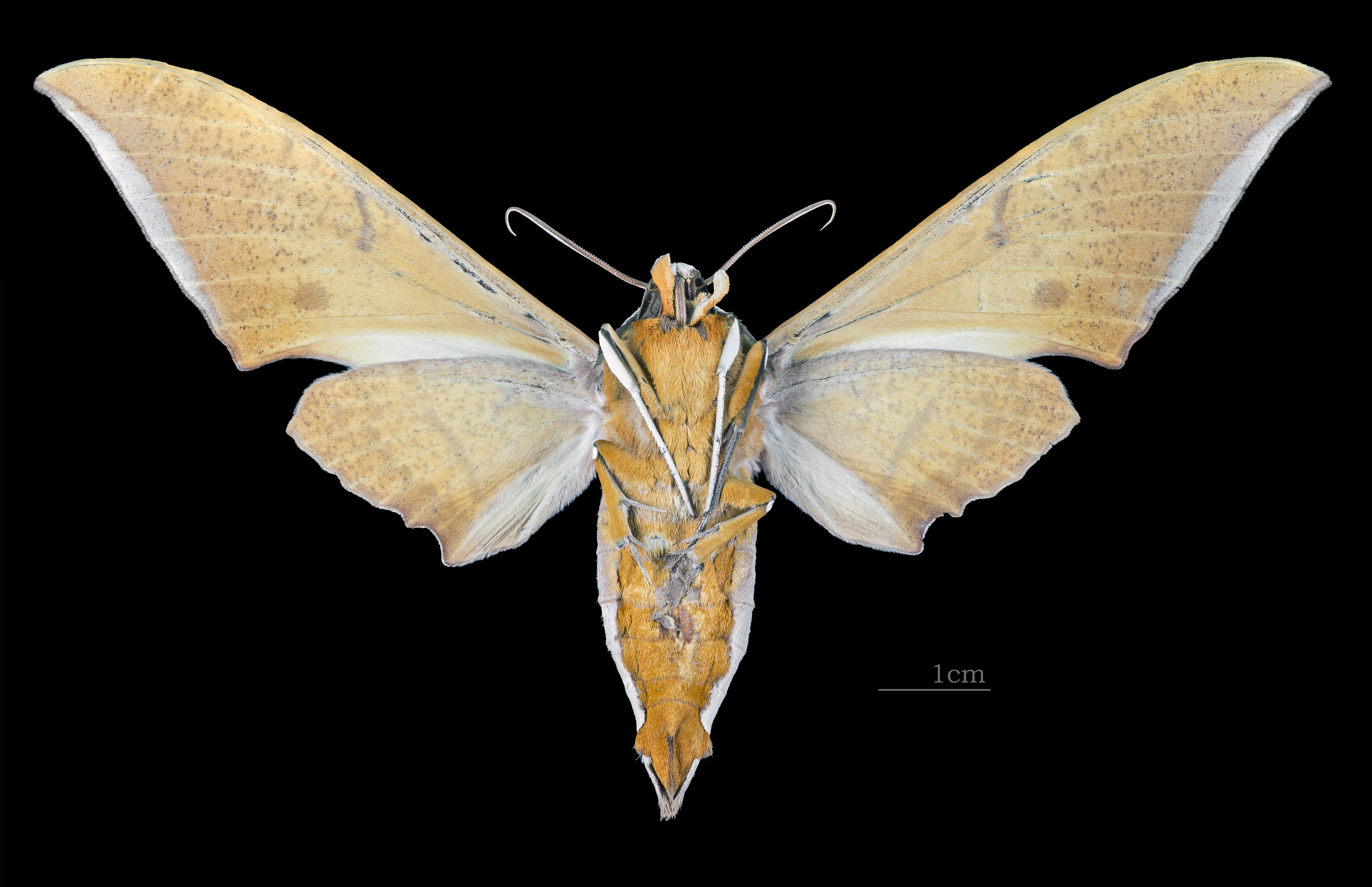
Male, ventral view
