= Macroglossum trigi =

Scientific classification
- Kingdom: Animalia
- Phylum: Arthropoda
- Class: Insecta
- Order: Lepidoptera
- Family: Sphingidae
- Genus: Macroglossum
- Species: M. trigi

Binomial name
- Macroglossum trigi Eitschberger, 2004

Species of moth

Macroglossum trigi is a moth of the family Sphingidae. It is known from Sulawesi.
