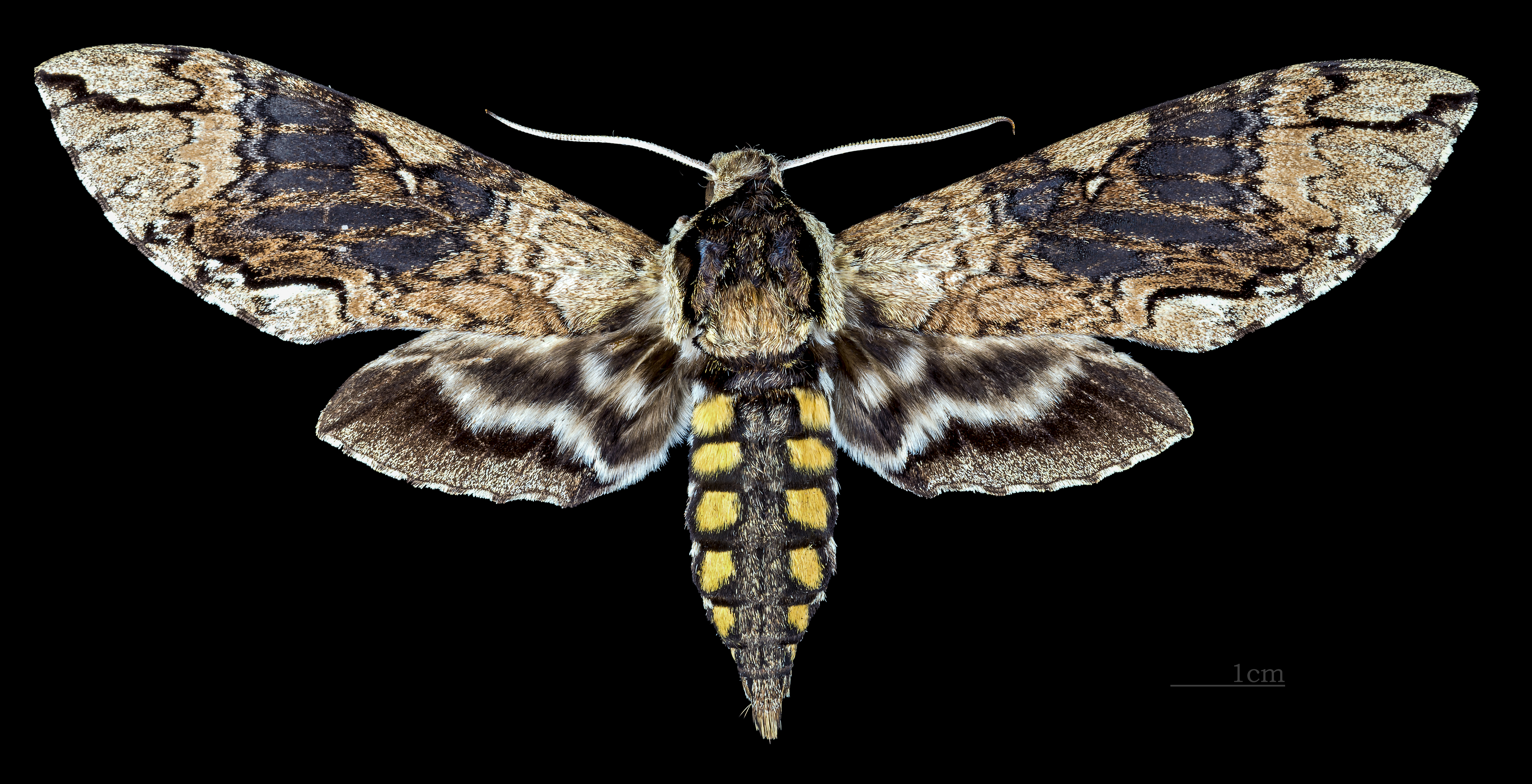
- Dorsal view
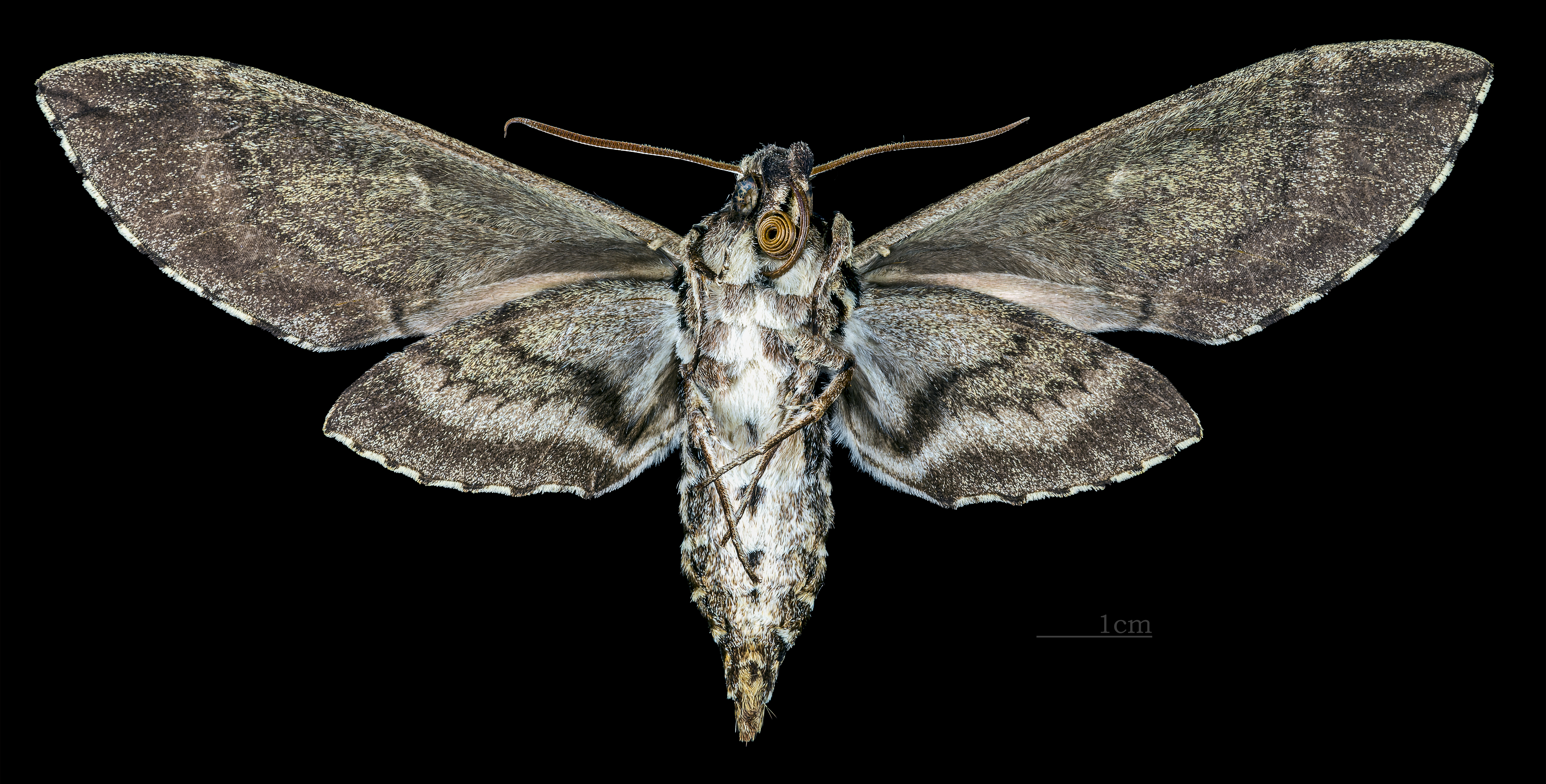
- Ventral view

Scientific classification
- Kingdom: Animalia
- Phylum: Arthropoda
- Class: Insecta
- Order: Lepidoptera
- Family: Sphingidae
- Genus: Manduca
- Species: M. morelia

Binomial name
- Manduca morelia (H. Druce, 1884)

Synonyms
- Pseudosphinx morelia H. Druce, 1884; Protoparce leucophila Gehlen, 1931

= Manduca morelia =

Species of moth

Manduca morelia is a moth of the family Sphingidae first described by Herbert Druce in 1884. It is known from Mexico.
