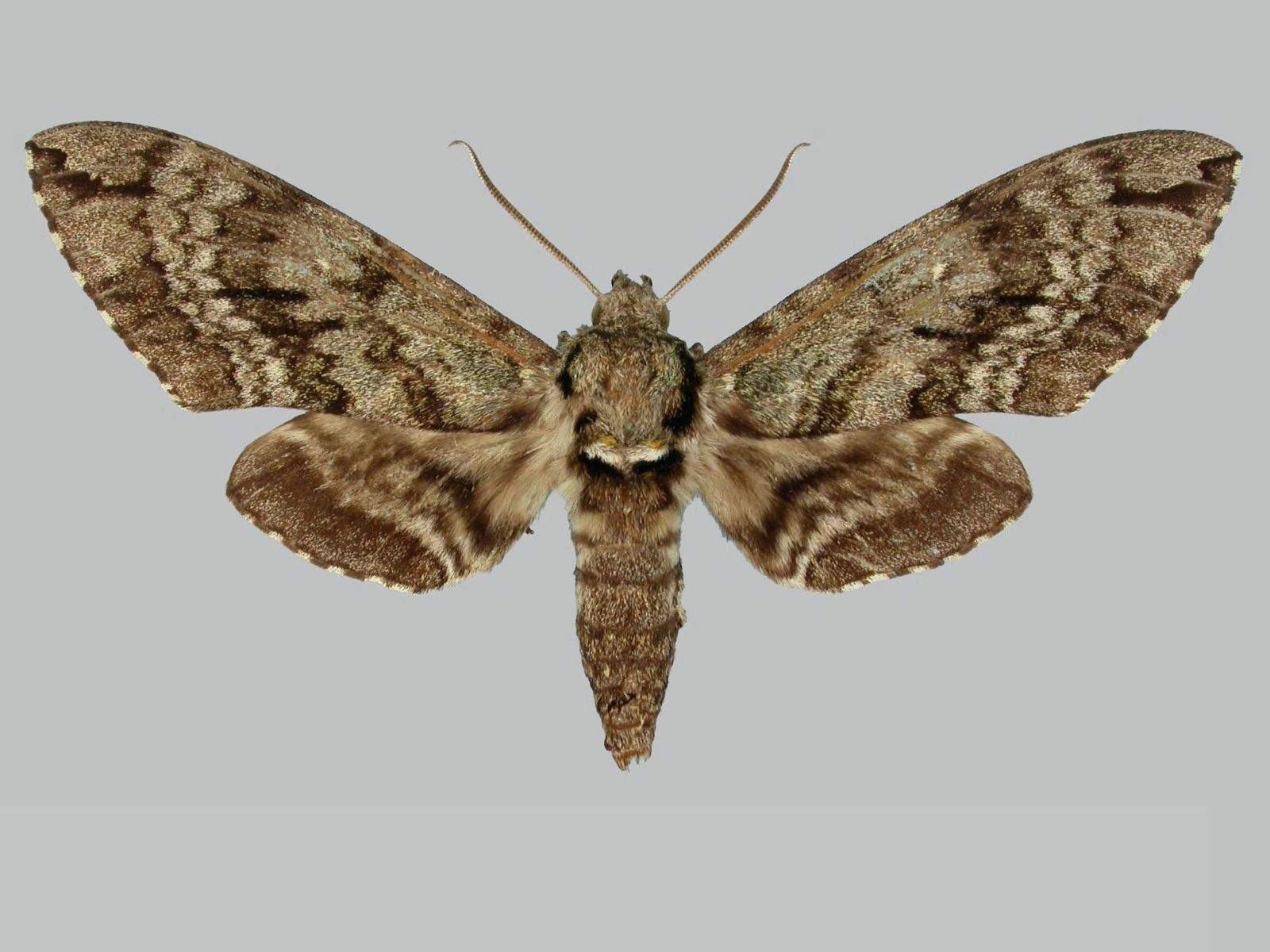
- Male

Scientific classification
- Kingdom: Animalia
- Phylum: Arthropoda
- Class: Insecta
- Order: Lepidoptera
- Family: Sphingidae
- Genus: Manduca
- Species: M. undata

Binomial name
- Manduca undata (Rothschild & Jordan, 1903)

Synonyms
- Chlaenogramma undata Rothschild & Jordan, 1903; Chlaenogramma obscura Clark, 1916; Chlaenogramma undata cinerea Rothschild & Jordan, 1903

= Manduca undata =

Species of moth

Manduca undata is a moth of the family Sphingidae. It is known from Argentina and Paraguay.

The wingspan is about 100 mm. The head and thorax are pale olive. Both wings have greyish creamy buff or grey uppersides, shaded with brown and crossed by black lines and bands. The underside of both wings has a similar ground colour as the upperside, although the forewing underside is more shaded with brown.

Adults have been recorded in December and March.
