= Manduca aztecus =

Scientific classification
- Kingdom: Animalia
- Phylum: Arthropoda
- Class: Insecta
- Order: Lepidoptera
- Family: Sphingidae
- Genus: Manduca
- Species: M. aztecus

Binomial name
- Manduca aztecus (Mooser, 1942)

Synonyms
- Phlegethontius aztecus Mooser, 1942

Species of moth

Manduca aztecus is a moth of the family Sphingidae. It is known from Mexico.
