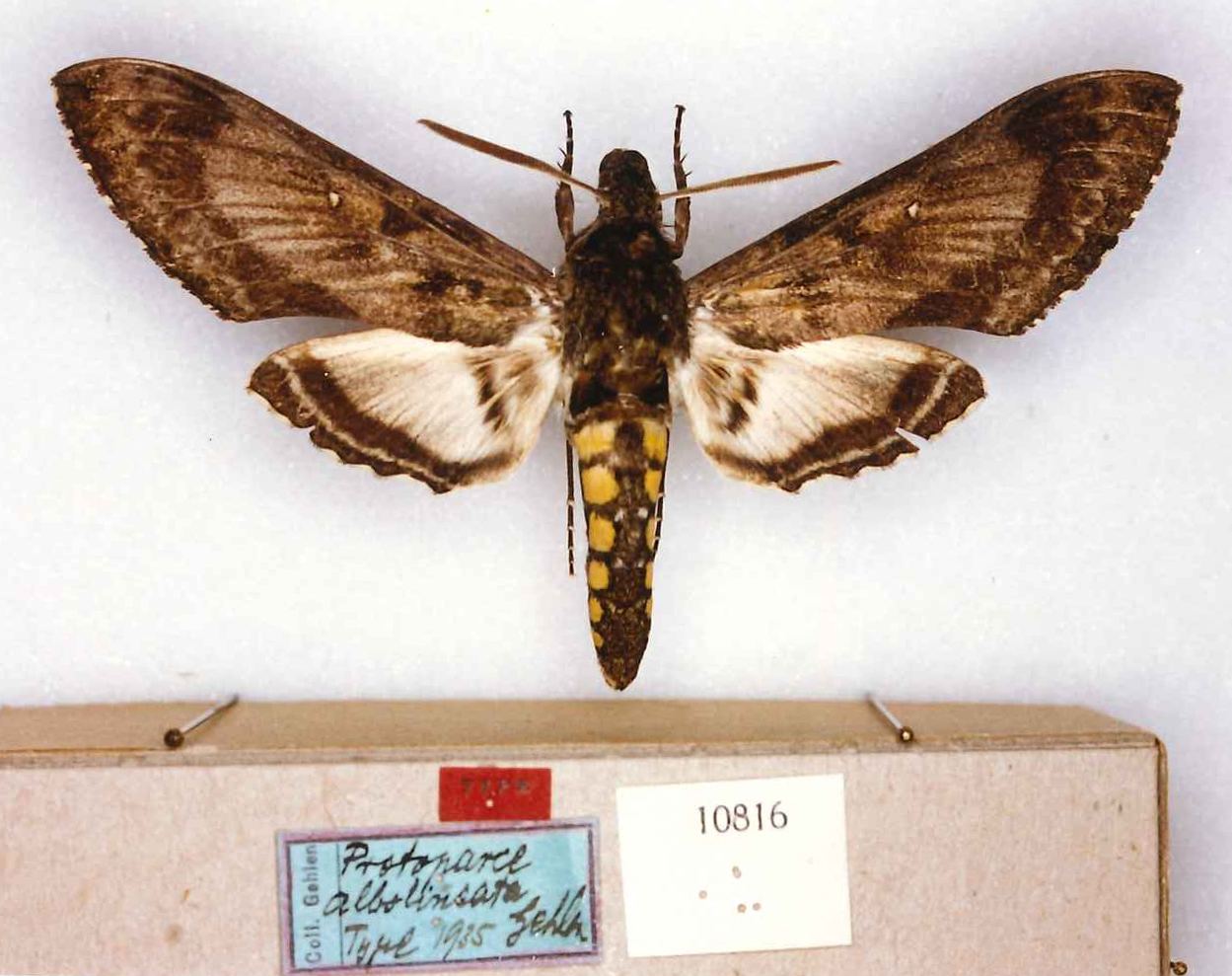

Scientific classification
- Kingdom: Animalia
- Phylum: Arthropoda
- Class: Insecta
- Order: Lepidoptera
- Family: Sphingidae
- Genus: Manduca
- Species: M. albolineata

Binomial name
- Manduca albolineata (Gehlen, 1935)

Synonyms
- Protoparce albolineata Gehlen, 1935

= Manduca albolineata =

Species of moth

Manduca albolineata is a moth of the family Sphingidae. It is known from Peru.
