= Manduca feronia =

Scientific classification
- Kingdom: Animalia
- Phylum: Arthropoda
- Class: Insecta
- Order: Lepidoptera
- Family: Sphingidae
- Genus: Manduca
- Species: M. feronia

Binomial name
- Manduca feronia (Kernbach, 1968)

Synonyms
- Protoparce feronia Kernbach, 1968

Species of moth

Manduca feronia is a moth of the family Sphingidae. It is known from Brazil.
