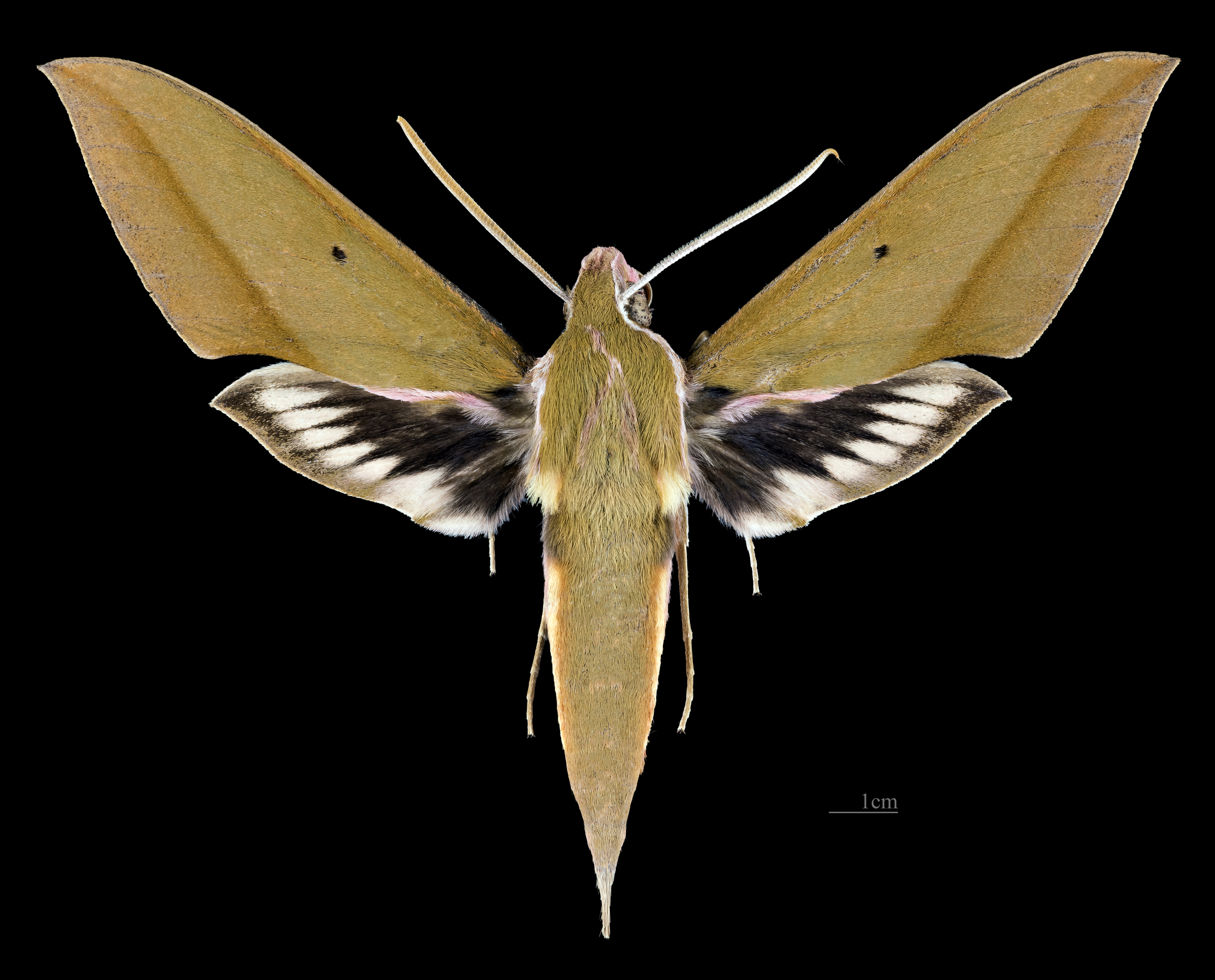
- Male dorsal Paratype MHNT
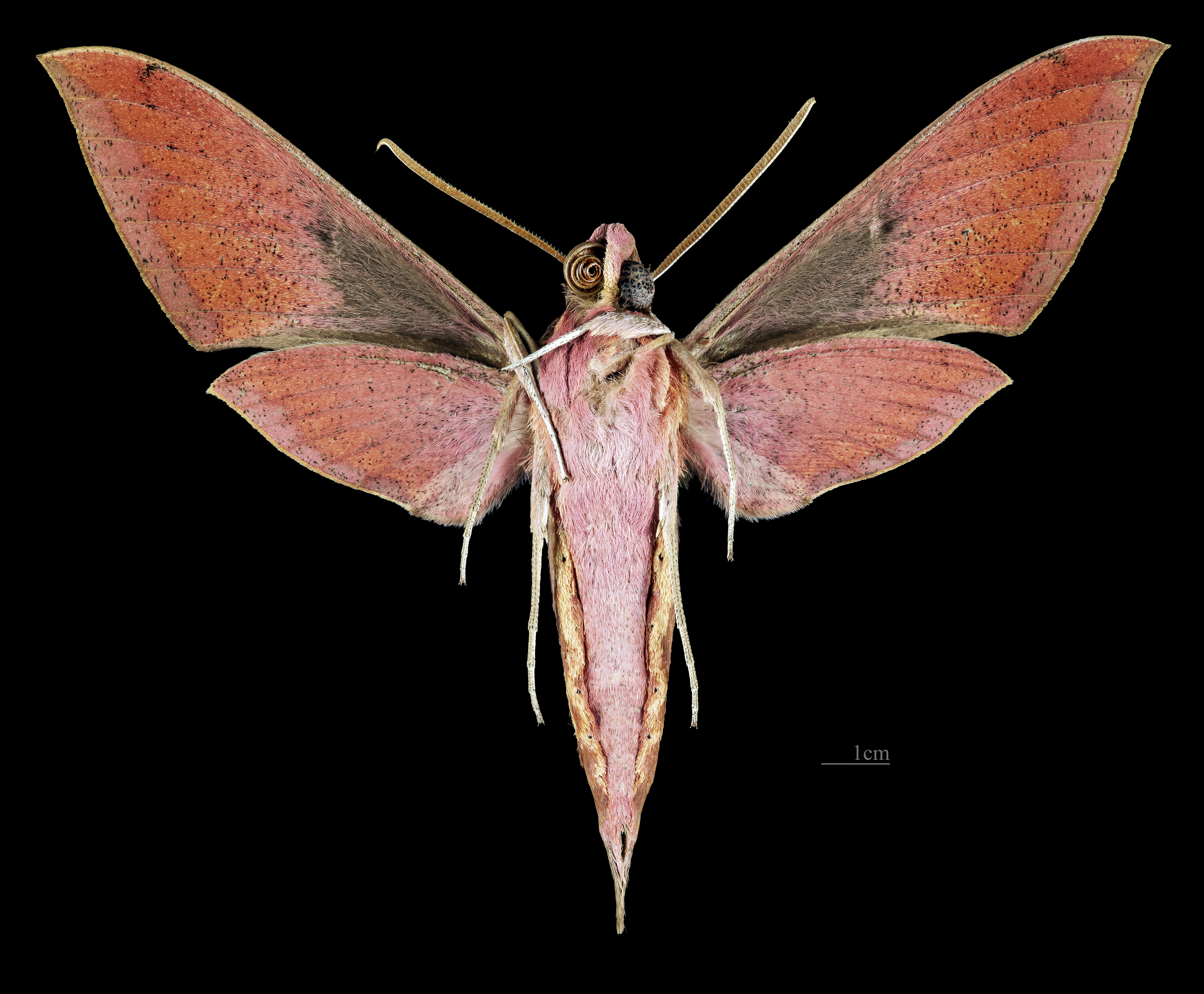
- Male ventral Paratype MHNT

Scientific classification
- Domain: Eukaryota
- Kingdom: Animalia
- Phylum: Arthropoda
- Class: Insecta
- Order: Lepidoptera
- Family: Sphingidae
- Genus: Xylophanes
- Species: X. schwartzi

Binomial name
- Xylophanes schwartzi Haxaire, 1992

= Xylophanes schwartzi =

Species of moth

Xylophanes schwartzi is a moth of the family Sphingidae. It is known from Ecuador.

The wingspan is 80–85 mm for males and 89–95 mm for females.
