= Xylophanes alvarezsierrai =

Scientific classification
- Domain: Eukaryota
- Kingdom: Animalia
- Phylum: Arthropoda
- Class: Insecta
- Order: Lepidoptera
- Family: Sphingidae
- Genus: Xylophanes
- Species: X. alvarezsierrai

Binomial name
- Xylophanes alvarezsierrai Alvarez Corral, 2001

Species of moth

Xylophanes alvarezsierrai is a moth of the family Sphingidae. It is from western Venezuela.
