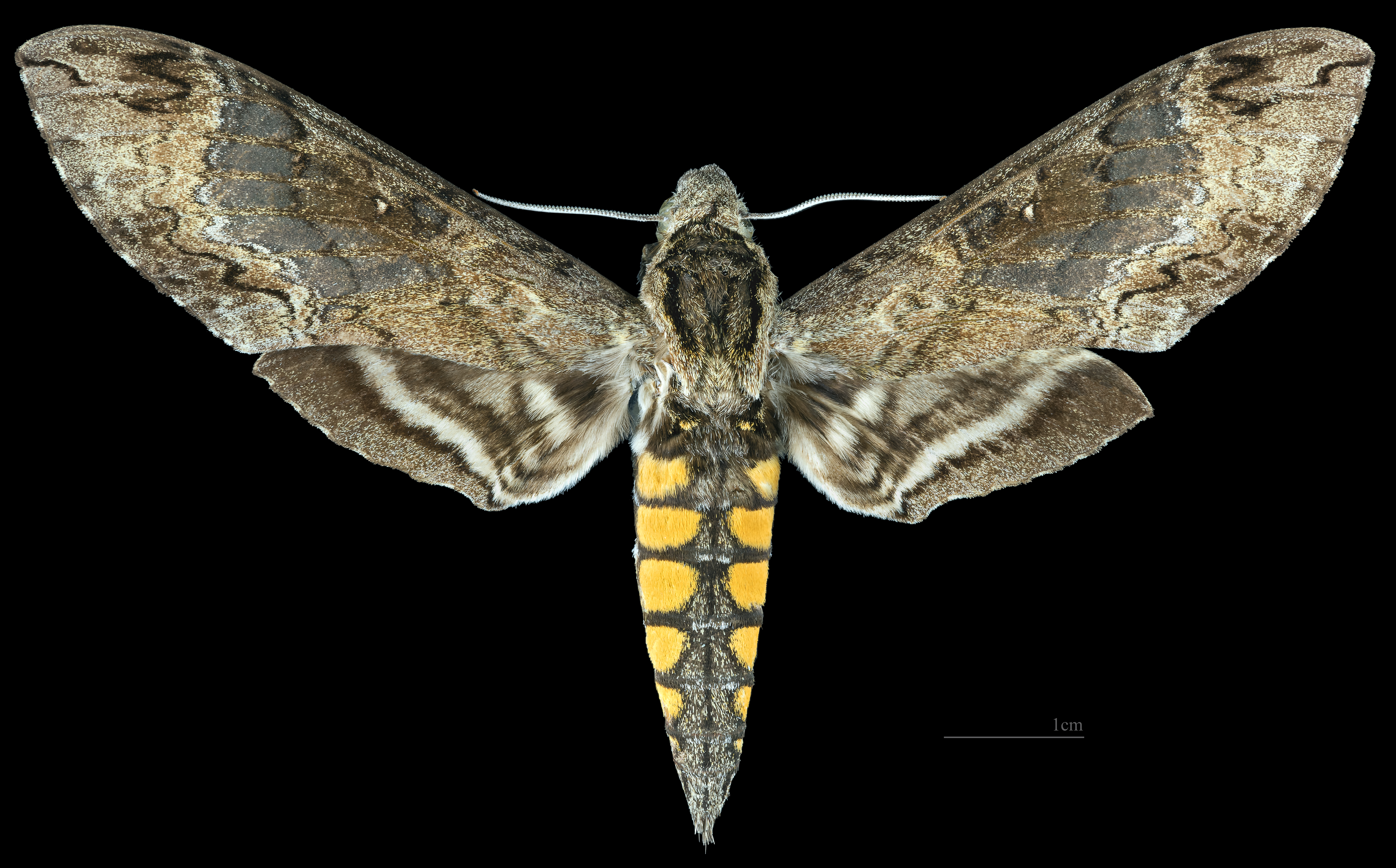
- Male dorsal
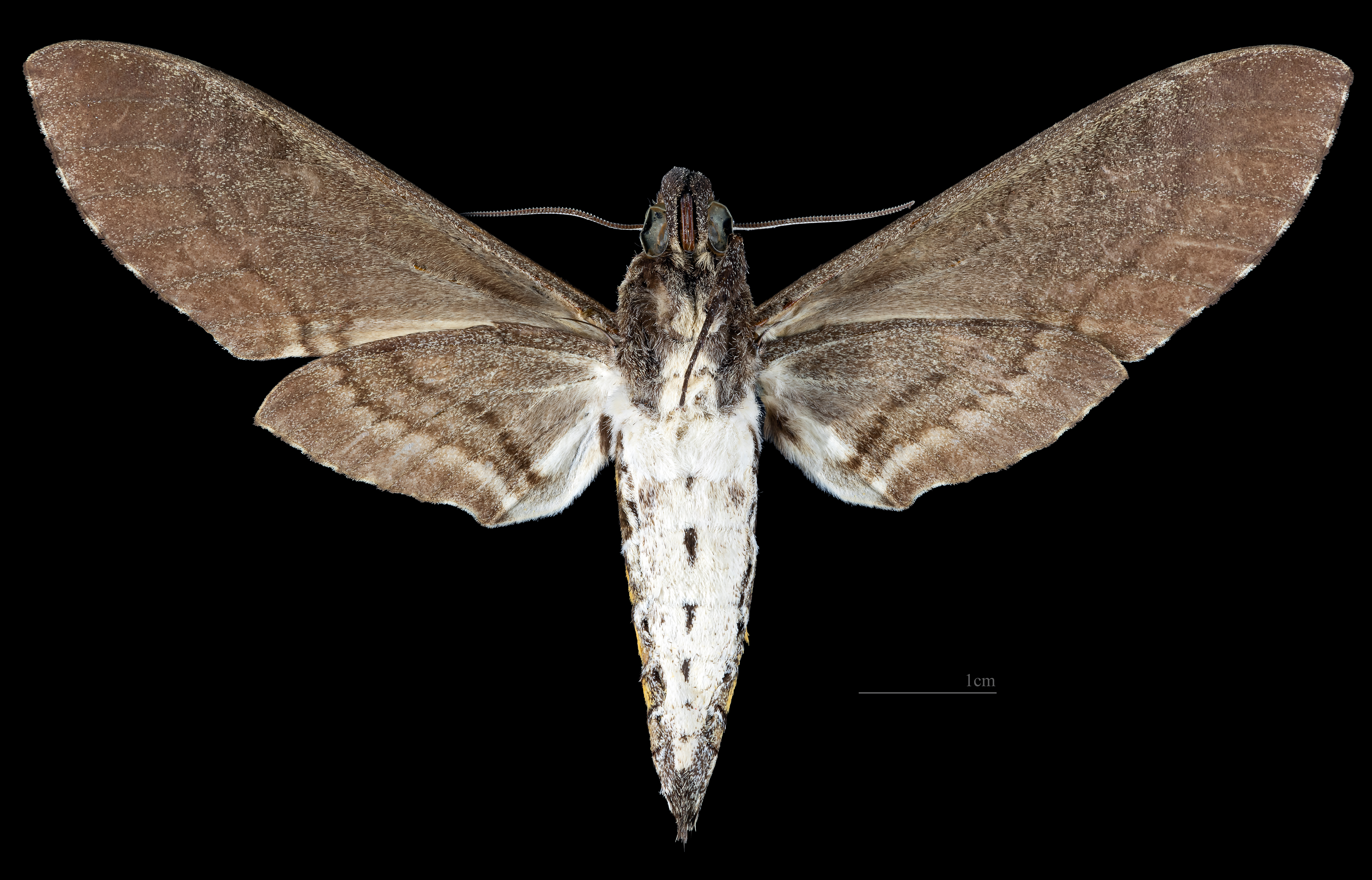
- Male ventral

Scientific classification
- Kingdom: Animalia
- Phylum: Arthropoda
- Class: Insecta
- Order: Lepidoptera
- Family: Sphingidae
- Genus: Manduca
- Species: M. reducta

Binomial name
- Manduca reducta (Gehlen, 1930)

Synonyms
- Protoparce reducta Gehlen, 1930

= Manduca reducta =

Species of moth

Manduca reducta is a moth of the family Sphingidae. It is known from Peru and Bolivia.

There are probably multiple generations per year.

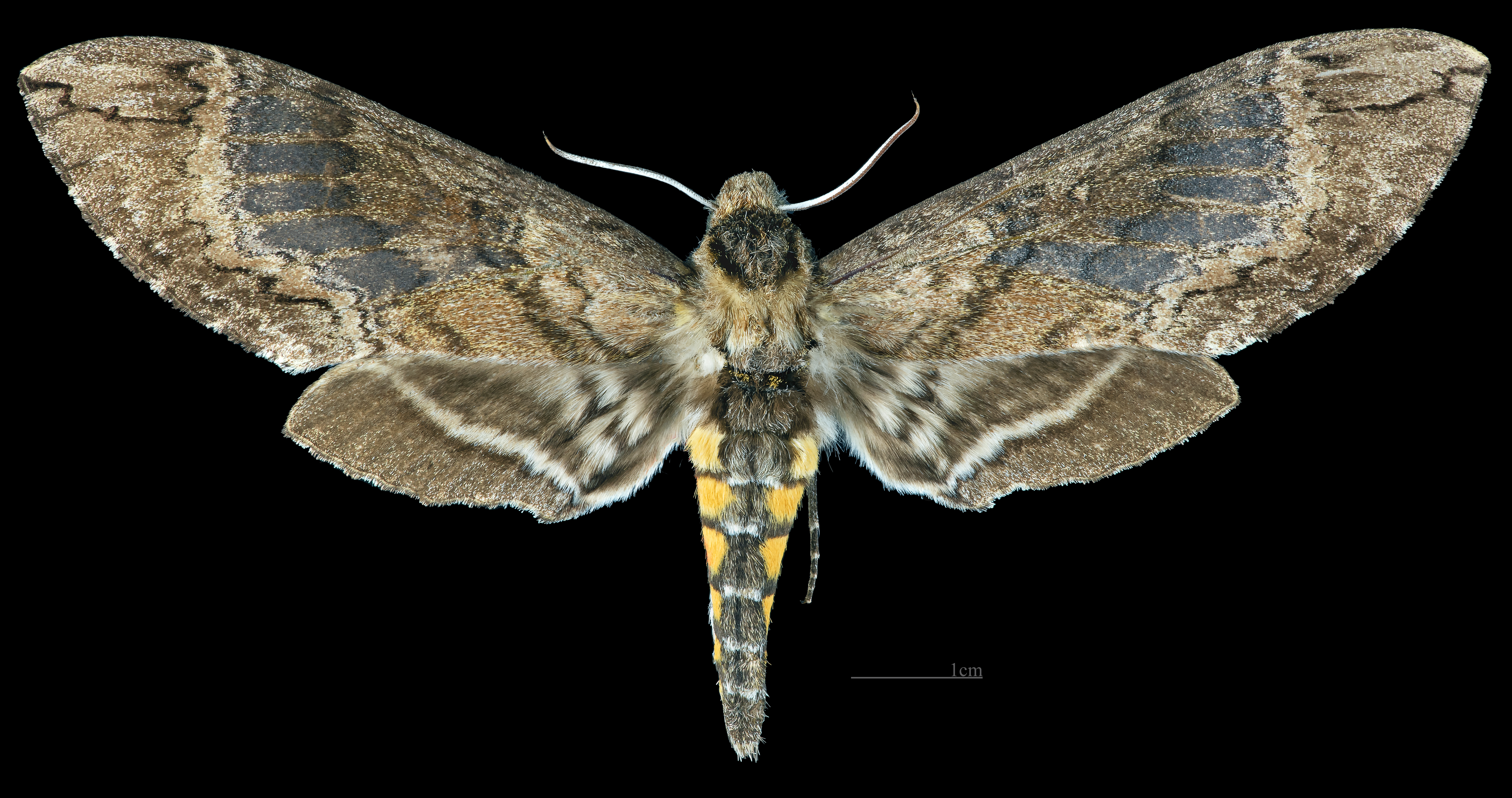
Female Dorsal

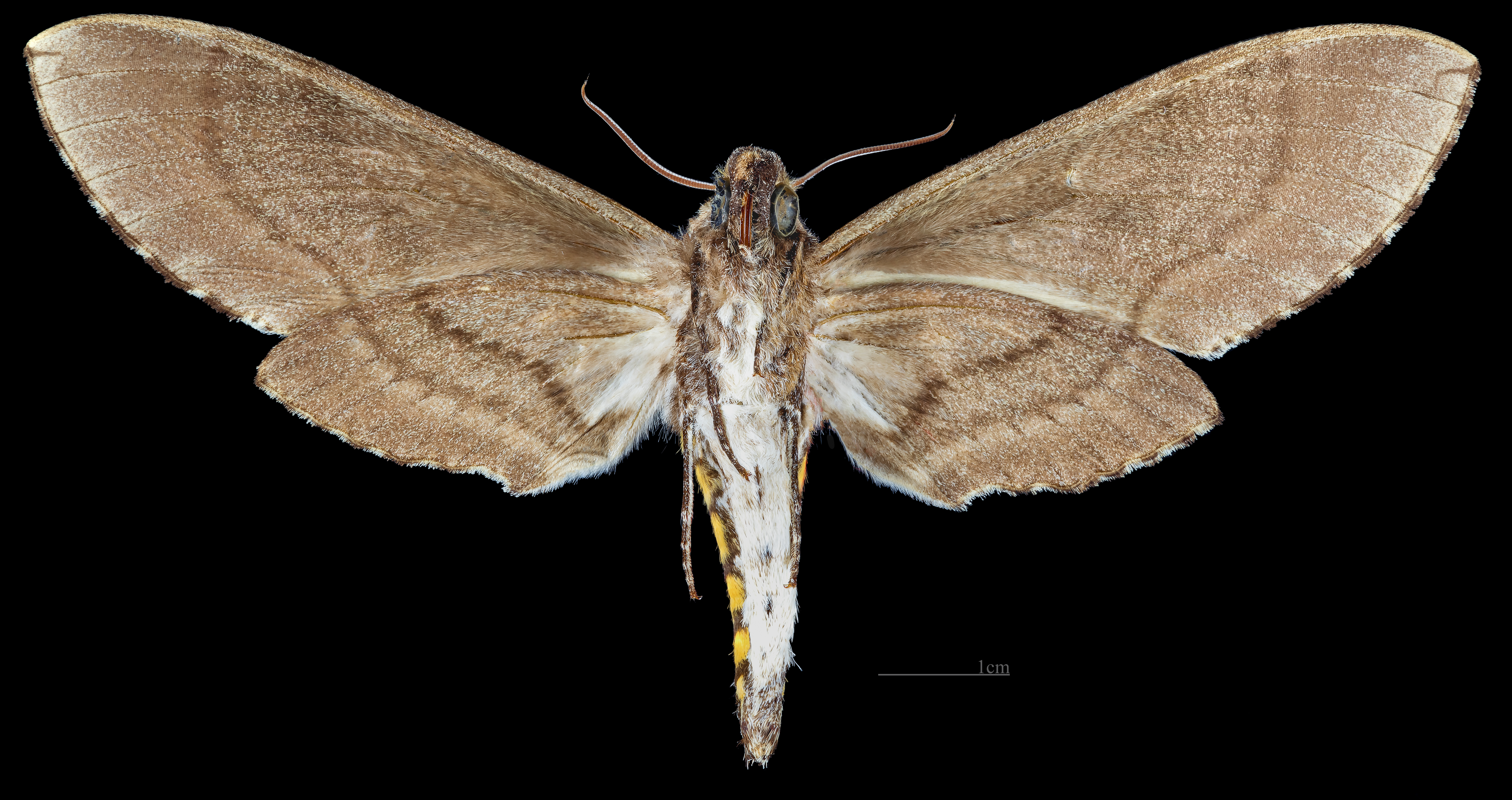
Female Ventral
