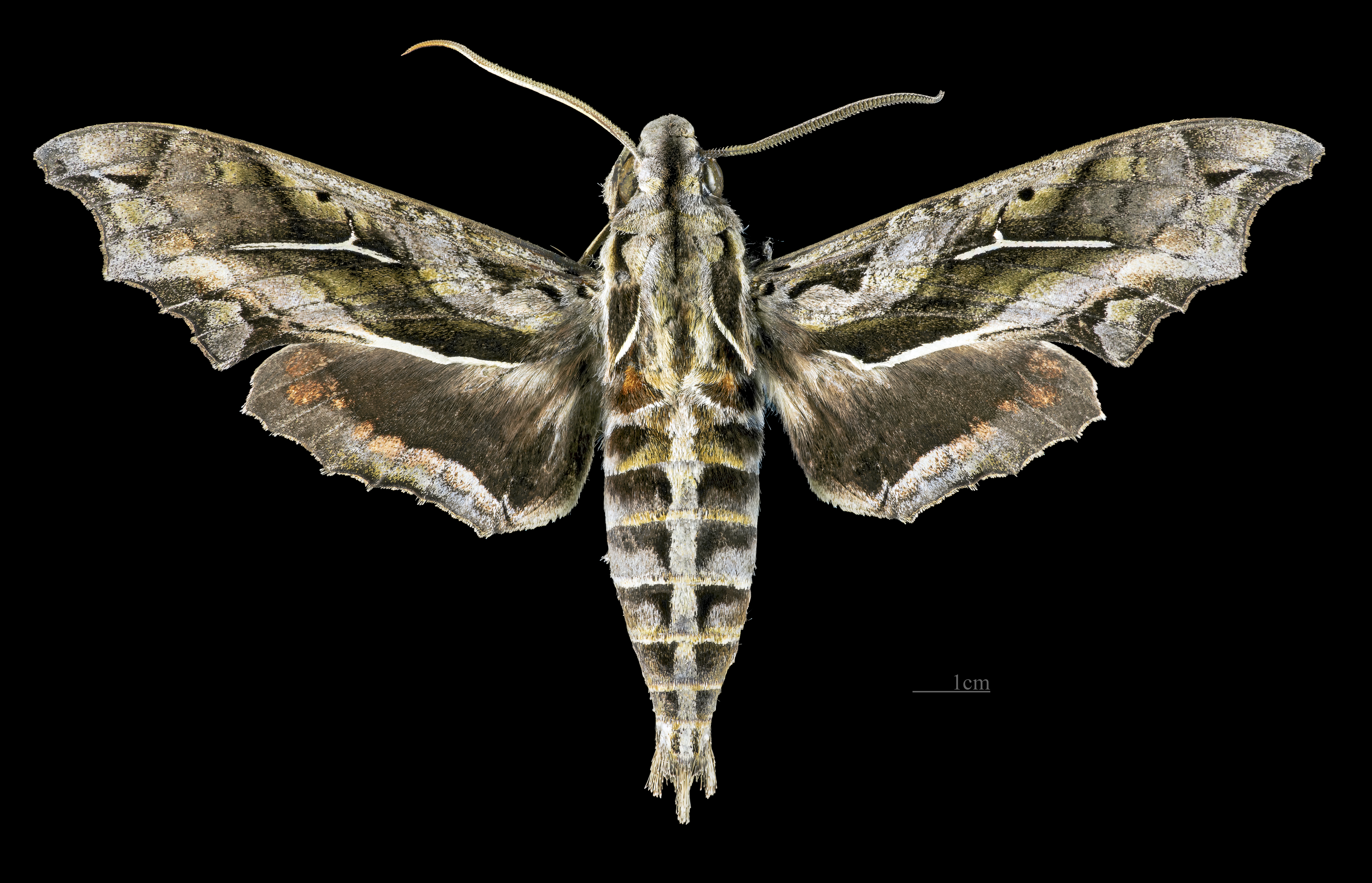
- Male dorsal
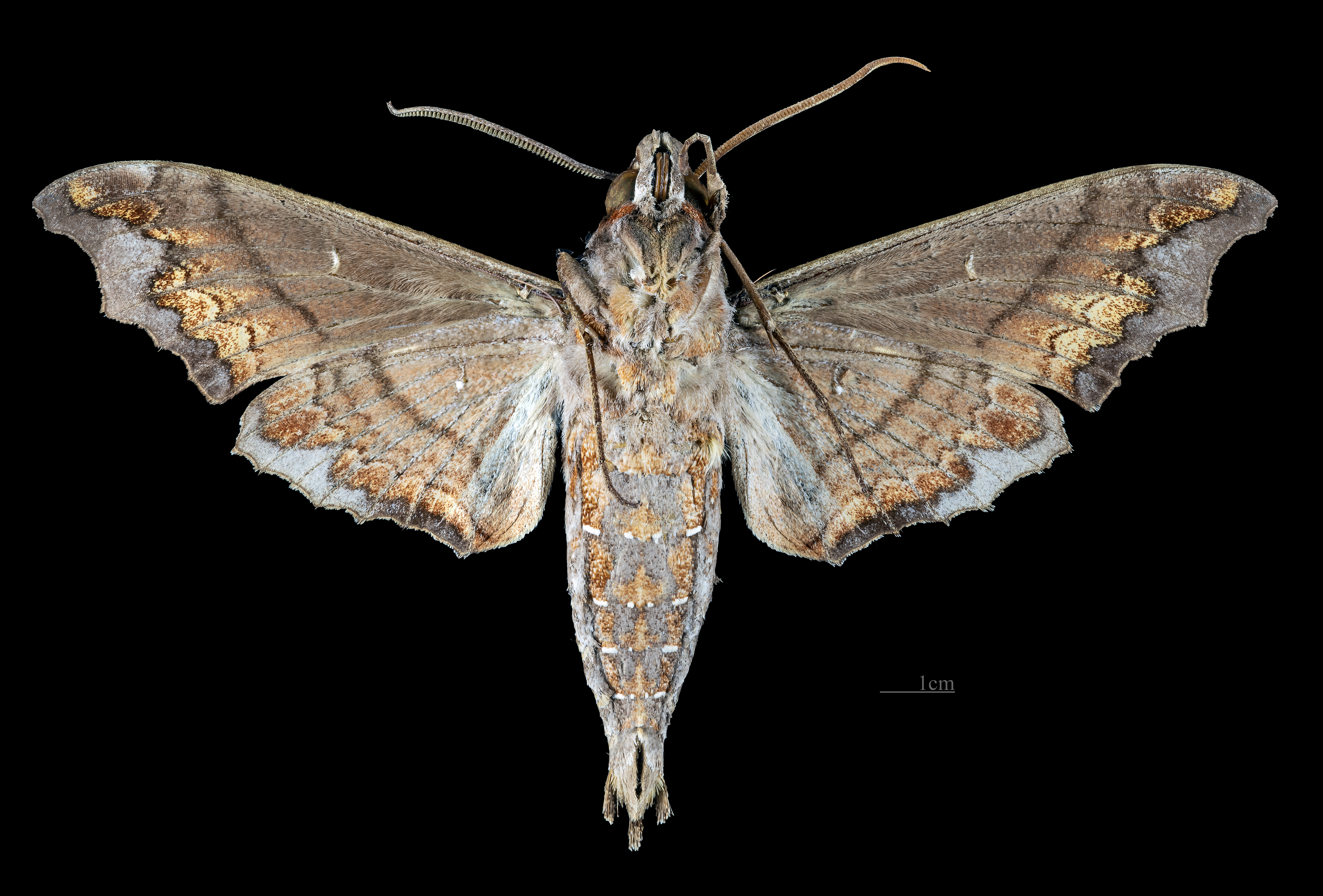
- Male ventral

Scientific classification
- Domain: Eukaryota
- Kingdom: Animalia
- Phylum: Arthropoda
- Class: Insecta
- Order: Lepidoptera
- Family: Sphingidae
- Genus: Hemeroplanes
- Species: H. longistriga

Binomial name
- Hemeroplanes longistriga (Rothschild & Jordan, 1903)

Synonyms
- Leucorhampha longistriga Rothschild & Jordan, 1903 This article incorporates text from this source, which is in the public domain.

= Hemeroplanes longistriga =

Species of moth

Hemeroplanes longistriga is a moth of the family Sphingidae.

== Distribution ==
It is known from Brazil and Ecuador.

== Description ==
It differs from all other Hemeroplanes species by the very long silver mark on the forewing upperside and lack of yellow bands on the upperside of the abdomen.

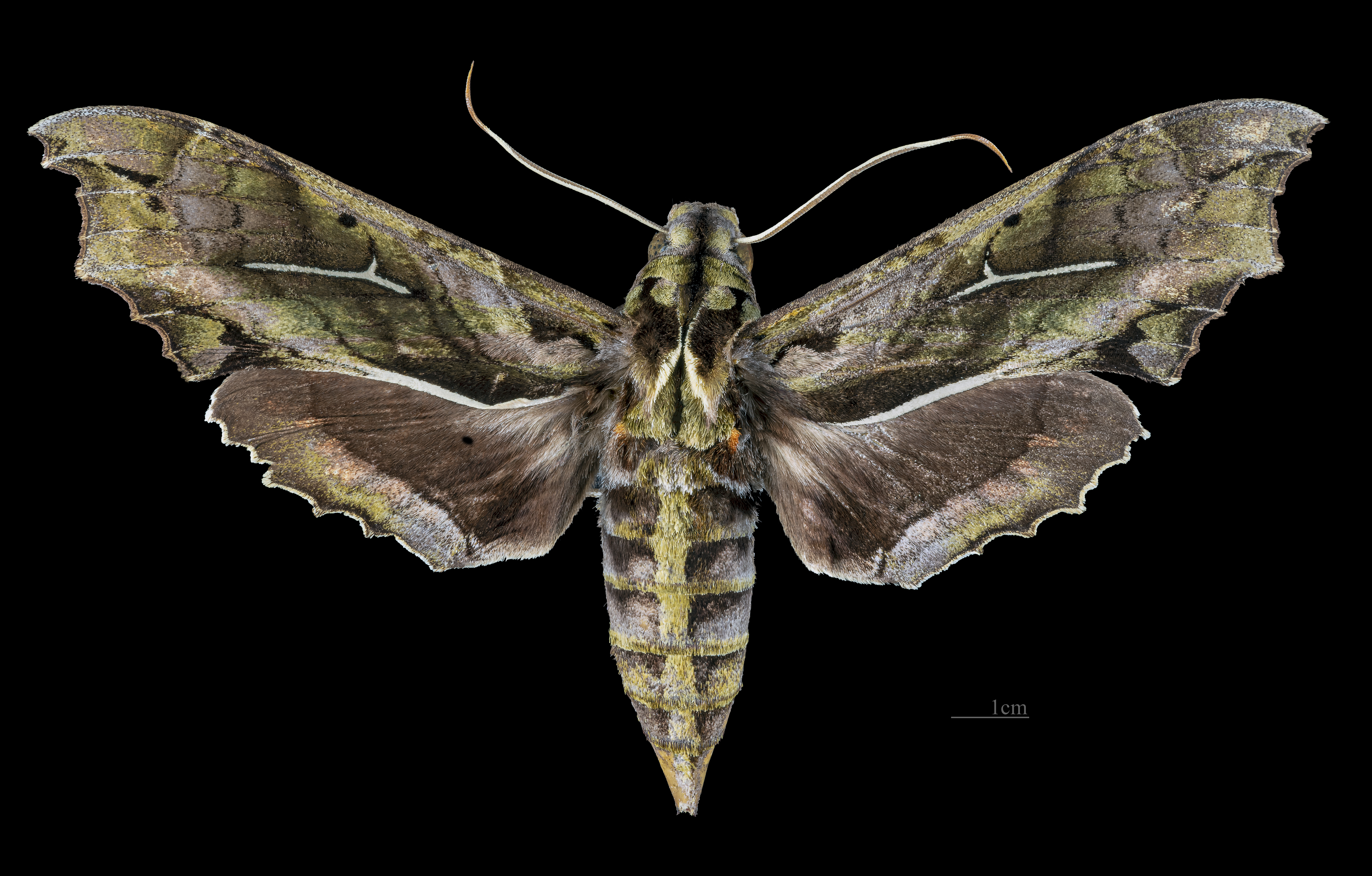
Female dorsal

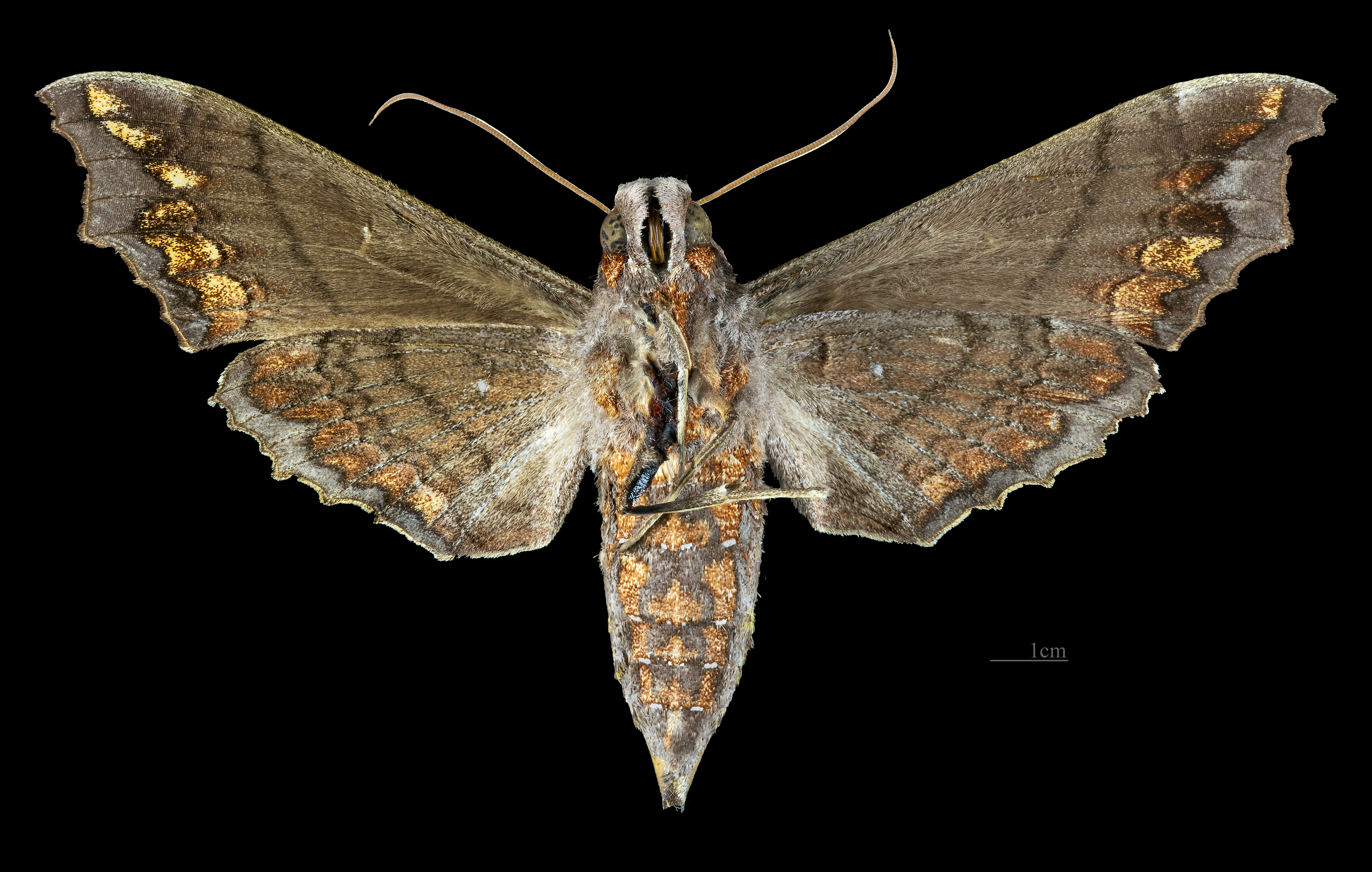
Female ventral

== Biology ==
There are probably at least two generations per year. Adults have been recorded in December in Brazil.
