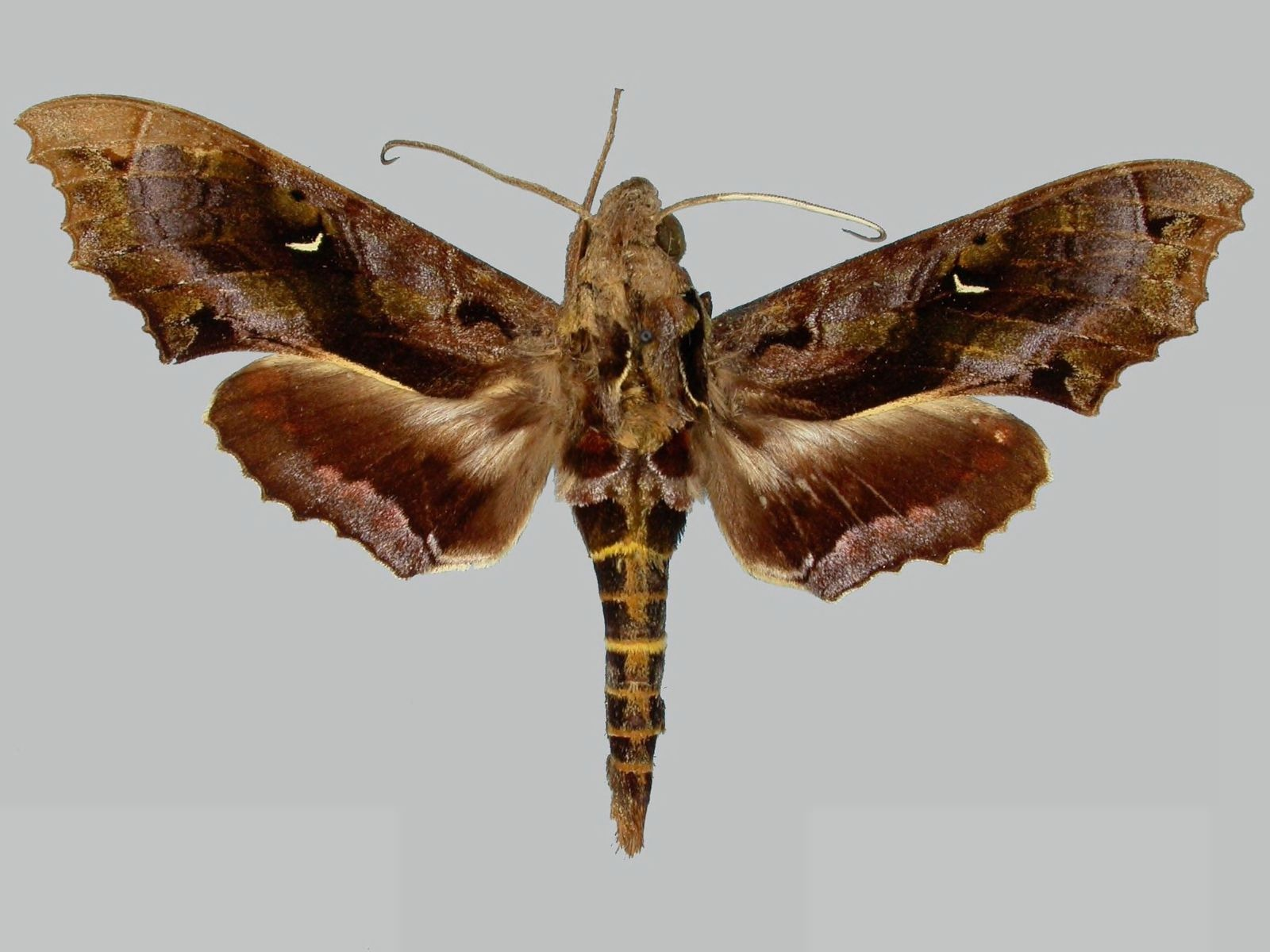

Scientific classification
- Domain: Eukaryota
- Kingdom: Animalia
- Phylum: Arthropoda
- Class: Insecta
- Order: Lepidoptera
- Family: Sphingidae
- Genus: Hemeroplanes
- Species: H. diffusa

Binomial name
- Hemeroplanes diffusa (Rothschild & Jordan, 1903)

Synonyms
- Leucorhampha diffusa Rothschild & Jordan, 1903

= Hemeroplanes diffusa =

Species of moth

Hemeroplanes diffusa is a species of moth from the family Sphingidae.

== Description ==
This species has lateral yellow bands of colour delimiting the abdominal segments. These bands occur on the upperside, along the entire length. The tergites are fringed with yellow colouration. Unlike the similar species Hemeroplanes triptolemus, the underside of the moth is a paler orange.

The upper side of the forewings have a bluish-white shading in the vicinity of the basal and postmedian regions. There is a silver mark approximately 4 to 5 mm in length.

The upper side of the hindwings are also contain a bluish-white shading in the marginal area, with the basal area having a similar colour.

== Distribution ==
The moth has been confirmed to reside in Colombia and Ecuador. The species may also be found in Peru and Bolivia, although it has not yet been confirmed.
