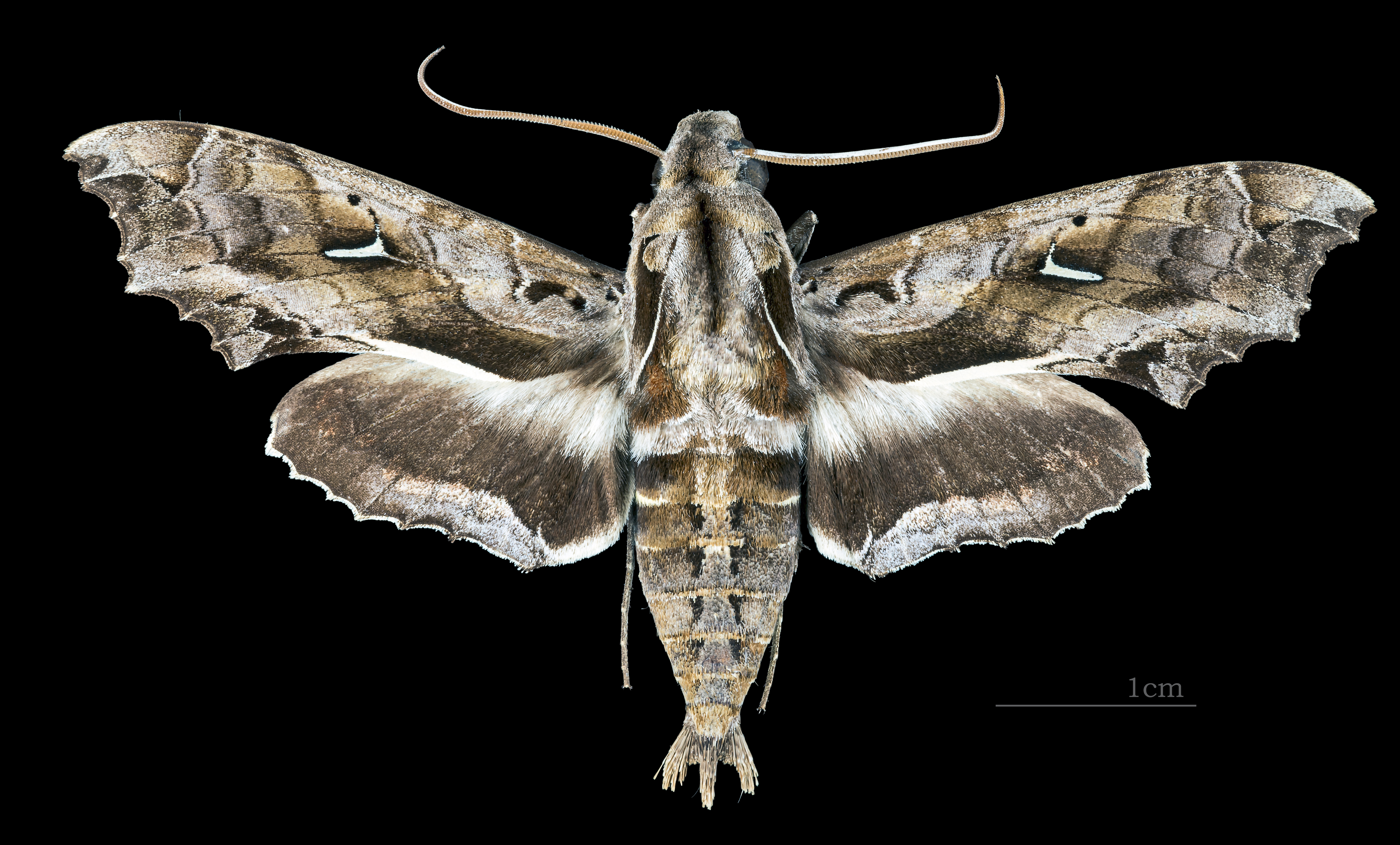
- Hemeroplanes triptolemus Male dorsal
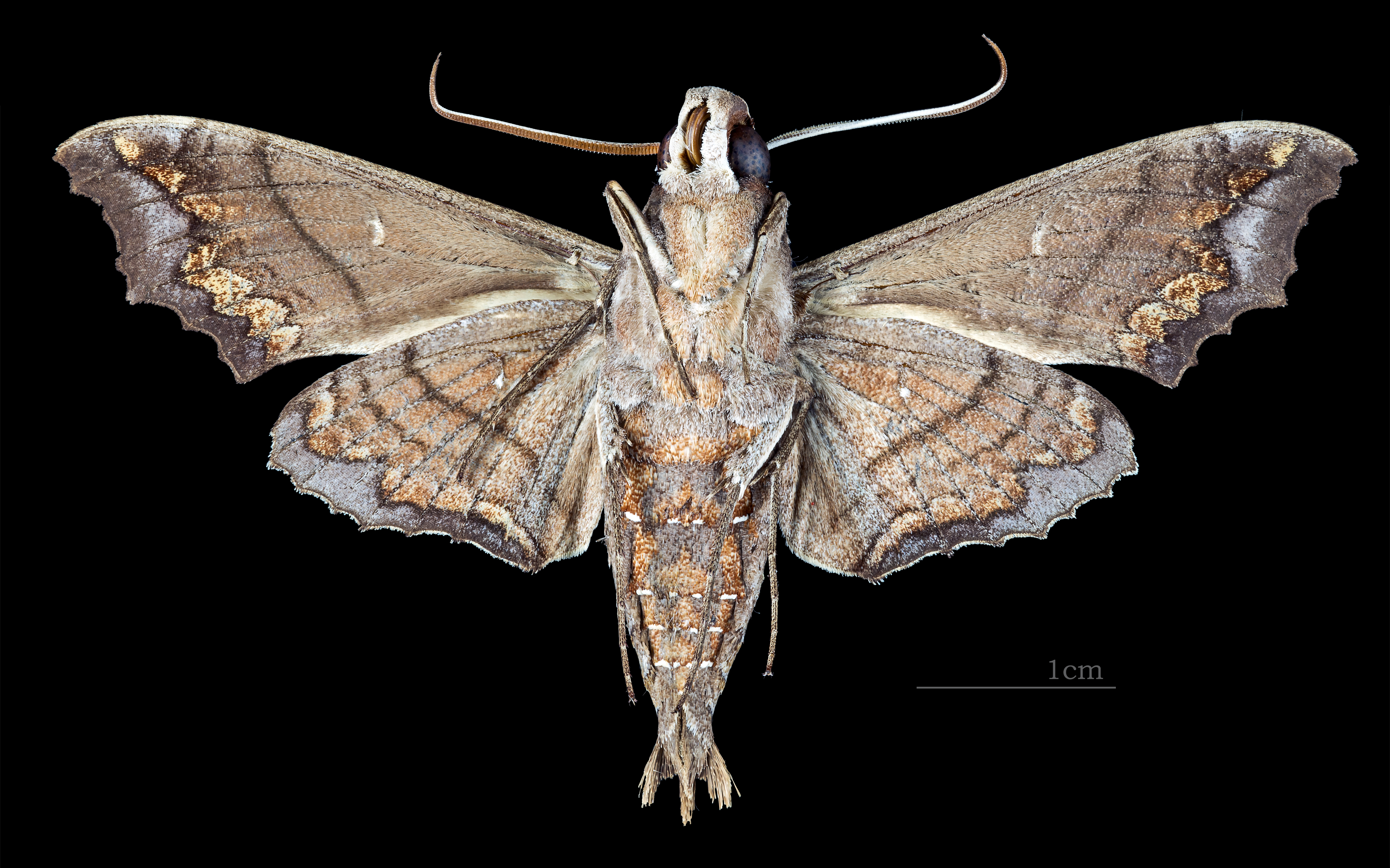
- Hemeroplanes triptolemus Male ventral

Scientific classification
- Kingdom: Animalia
- Phylum: Arthropoda
- Class: Insecta
- Order: Lepidoptera
- Family: Sphingidae
- Genus: Hemeroplanes
- Species: H. triptolemus

Binomial name
- Hemeroplanes triptolemus (Cramer, 1779)

Synonyms
- Sphinx triptolemus Cramer, 1779

= Hemeroplanes triptolemus =

Species of moth

Hemeroplanes triptolemus is a moth of the family Sphingidae.

== Description ==
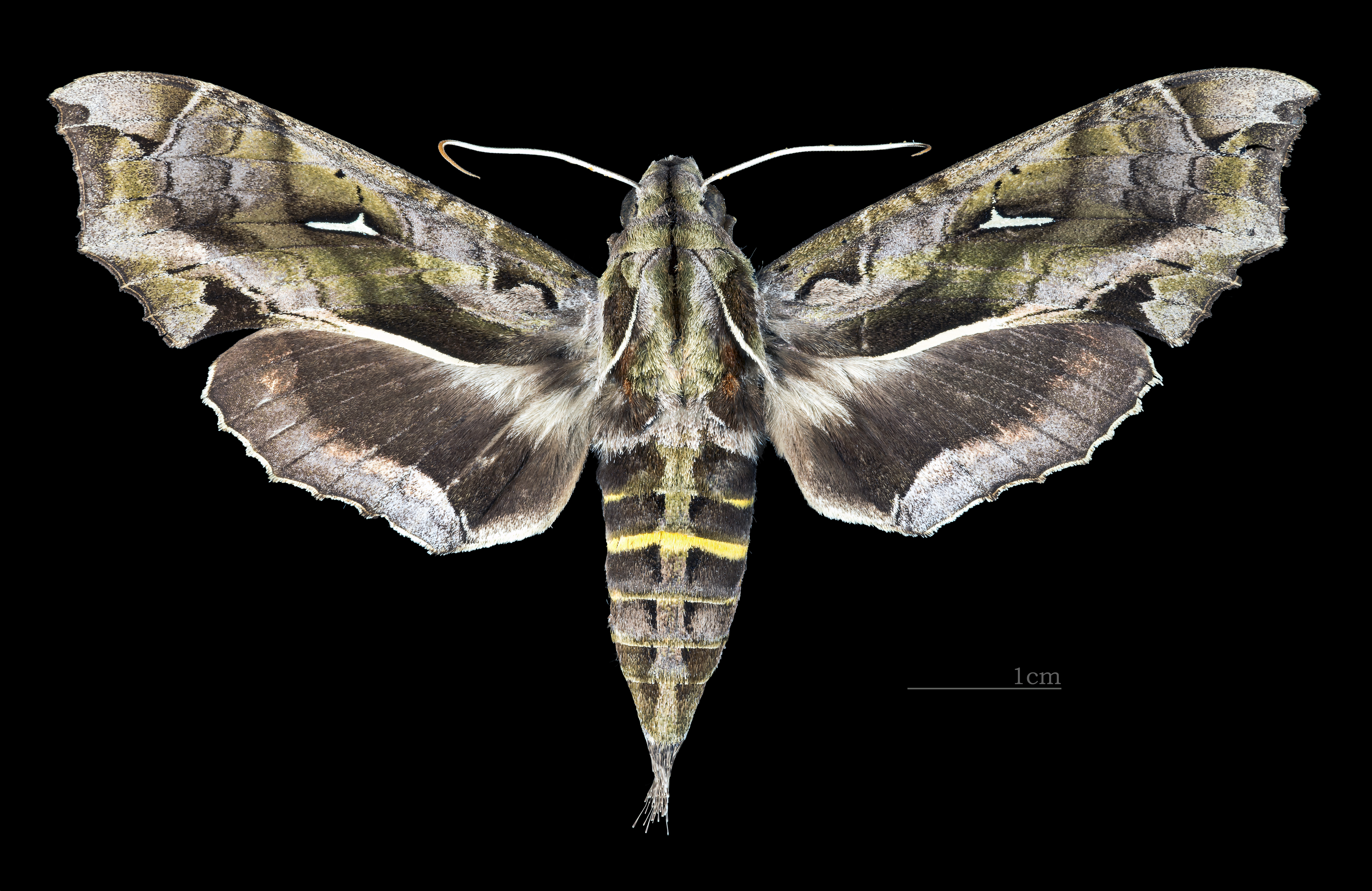
Female dorsal
(coll.MHNT)

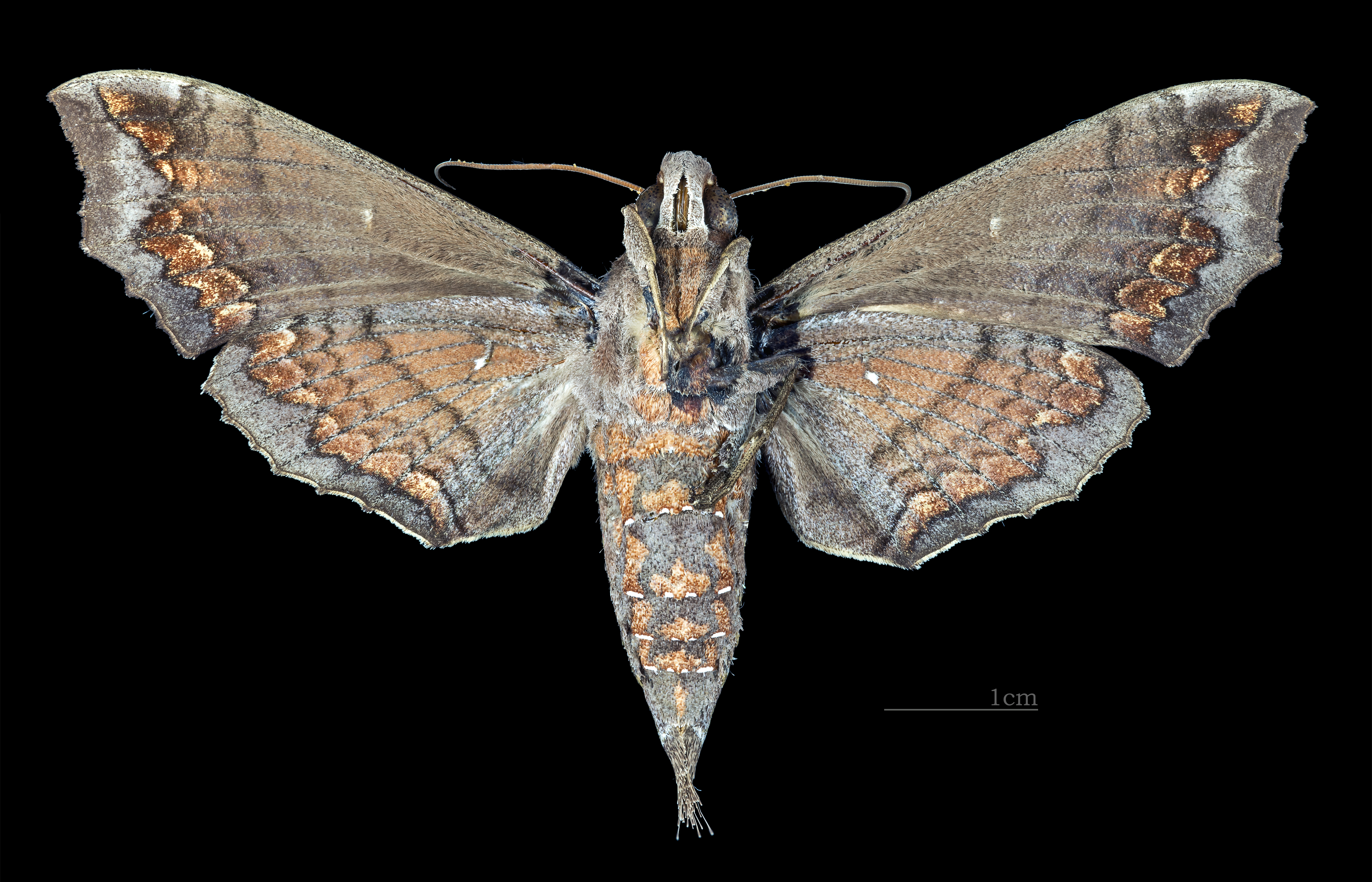
Female ventral
(coll.MHNT)

== Biology ==
Its chest and wings are covered in scales. The moth uses a proboscis to feed itself nectar. Both males and females have a relatively long lifetime of 10 to 30 days. The female moths lay pellucid green eggs. Egg growth varies strongly from 3 to 21 days. There are at least two generations per year with peak flights from January to February and again from June to July.

The larvae feed on Mesechites trifida. In its larval form, the Hemeroplanes triptolemus is capable of expanding its anterior body segments to give it the appearance of a snake, complete with eye patches. This snake mimicry extends even to the point where it will harmlessly strike at potential predators.

== Distribution ==
The moth is known from Costa Rica, Belize, Mexico, Guatemala and probably flies throughout Central America into Colombia, Ecuador, Bolivia, Argentina, Venezuela and Guyana.
