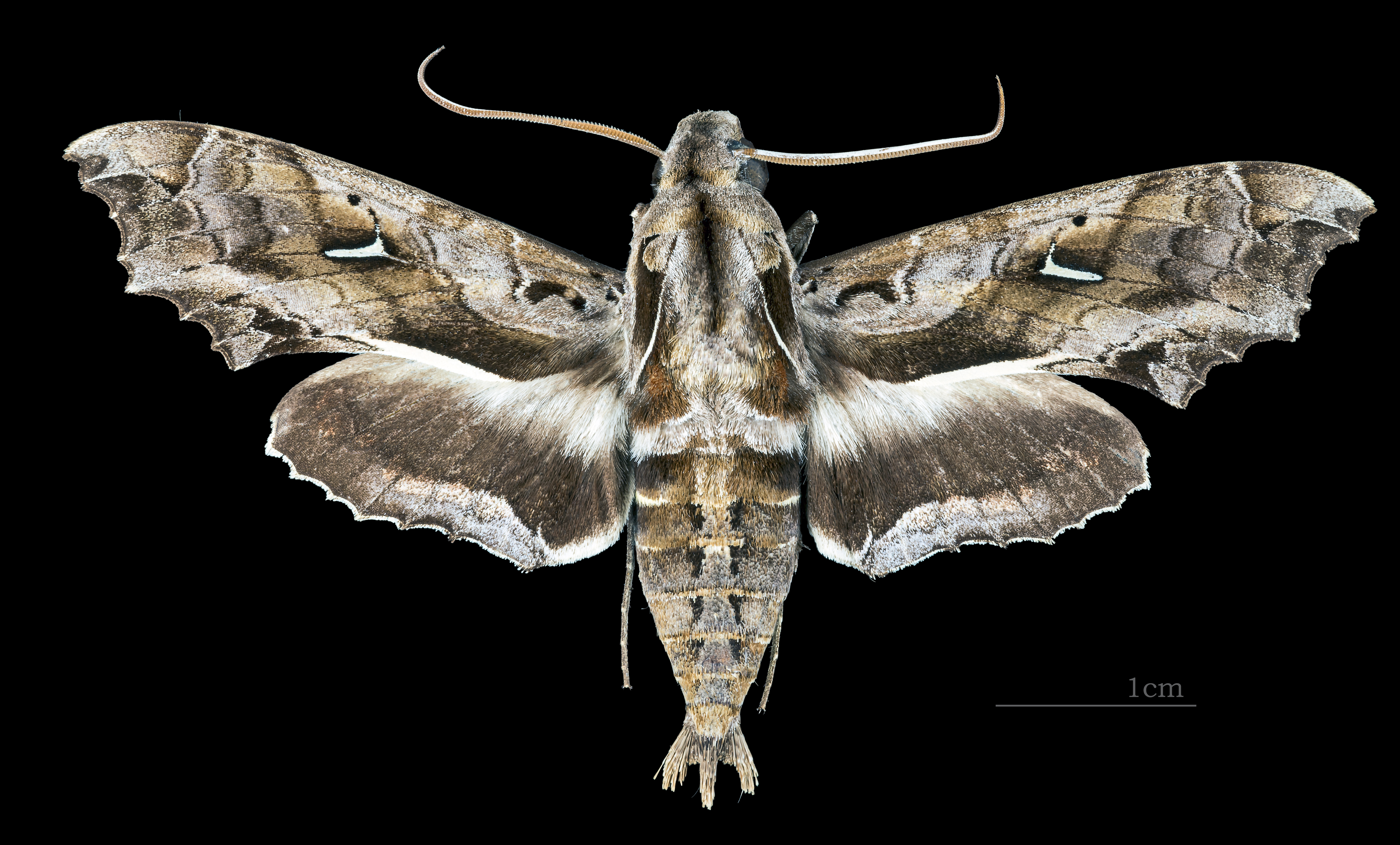
- Hemeroplanes triptolemus

Scientific classification
- Domain: Eukaryota
- Kingdom: Animalia
- Phylum: Arthropoda
- Class: Insecta
- Order: Lepidoptera
- Family: Sphingidae
- Subtribe: Dilophonotina
- Genus: Hemeroplanes; Hübner, 1819

Species
- See text

Synonyms
- Leucorhampha Rothschild & Jordan, 1903

= Hemeroplanes =

Genus of moths

Hemeroplanes is a genus of moths in the family Sphingidae.

== Species ==
- Hemeroplanes diffusa Rothschild & Jordan, 1903
- Hemeroplanes longistriga Rothschild & Jordan, 1903
- Hemeroplanes ornatus Rothschild, 1894
- Hemeroplanes triptolemus (Cramer, 1779)
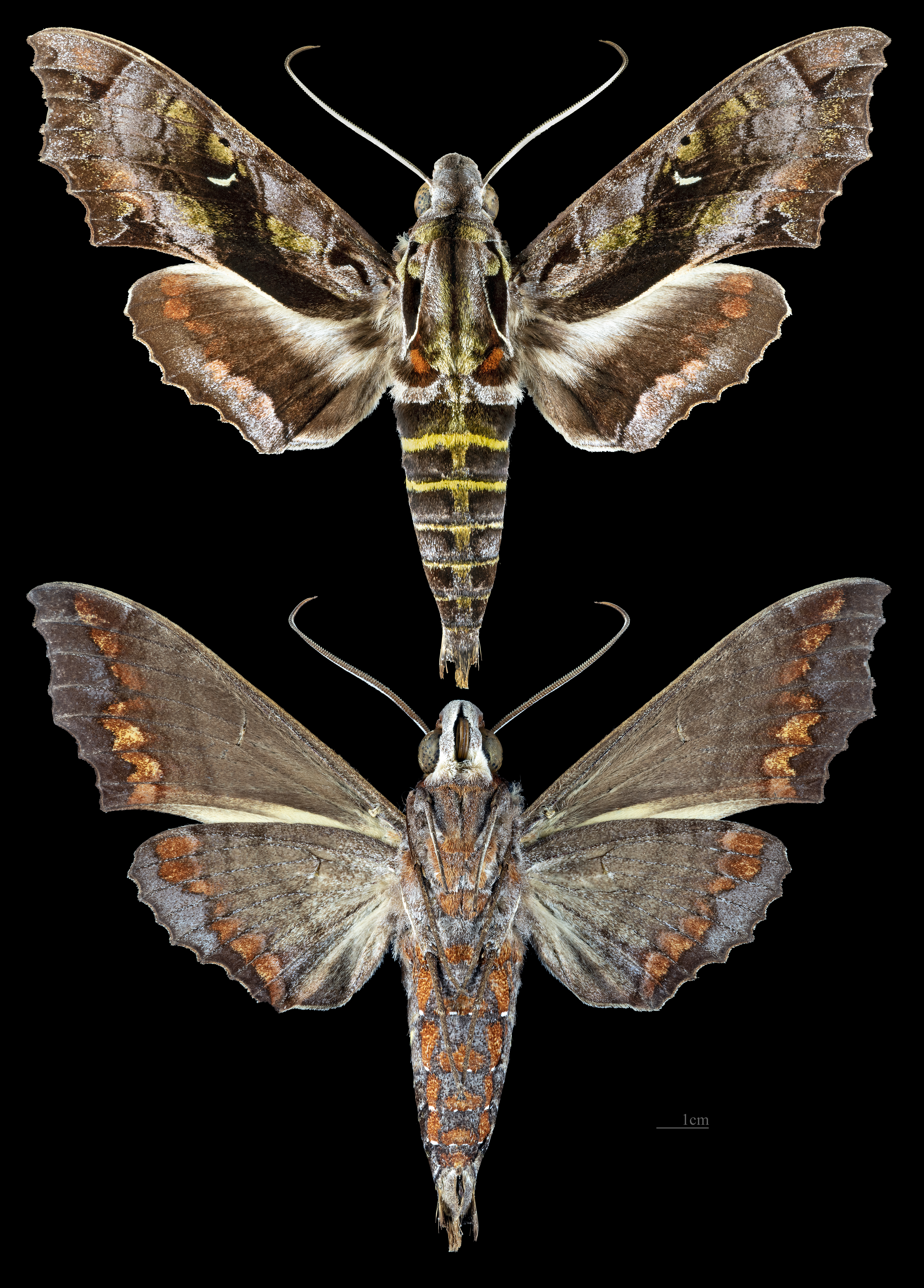
Hemeroplanes diffusa

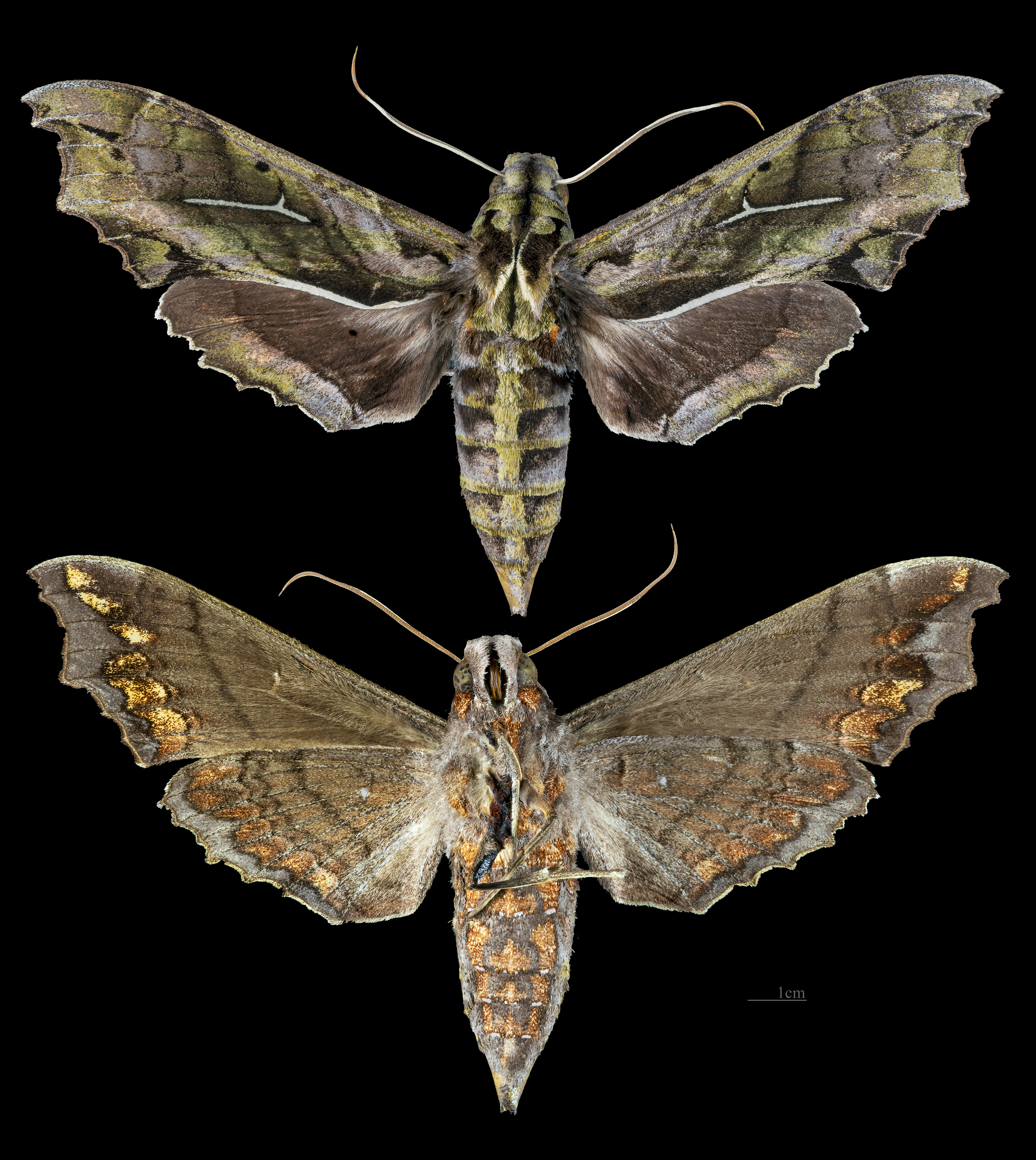
Hemeroplanes longistriga

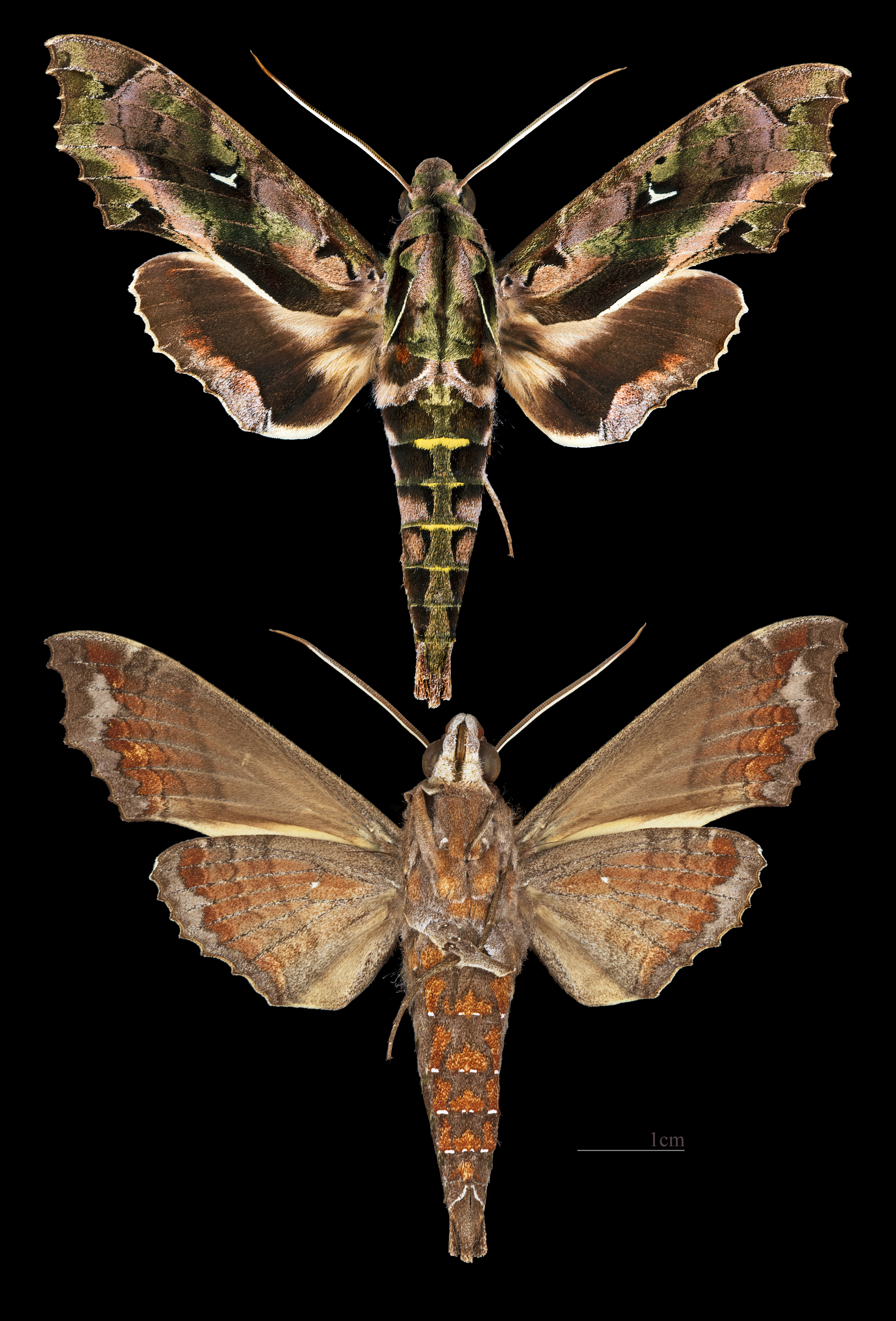
Hemeroplanes ornatus

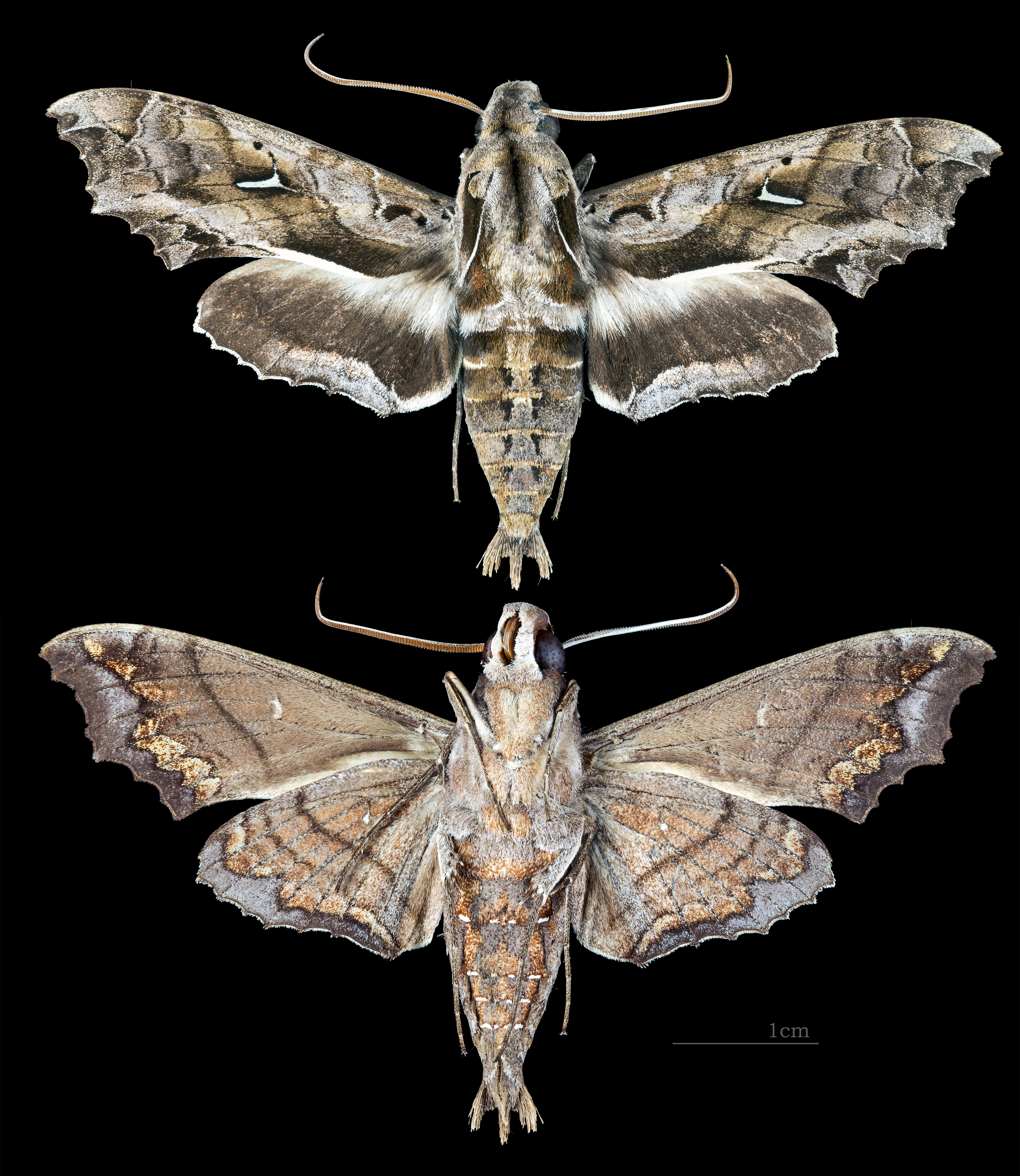
Hemeroplanes triptolemus
