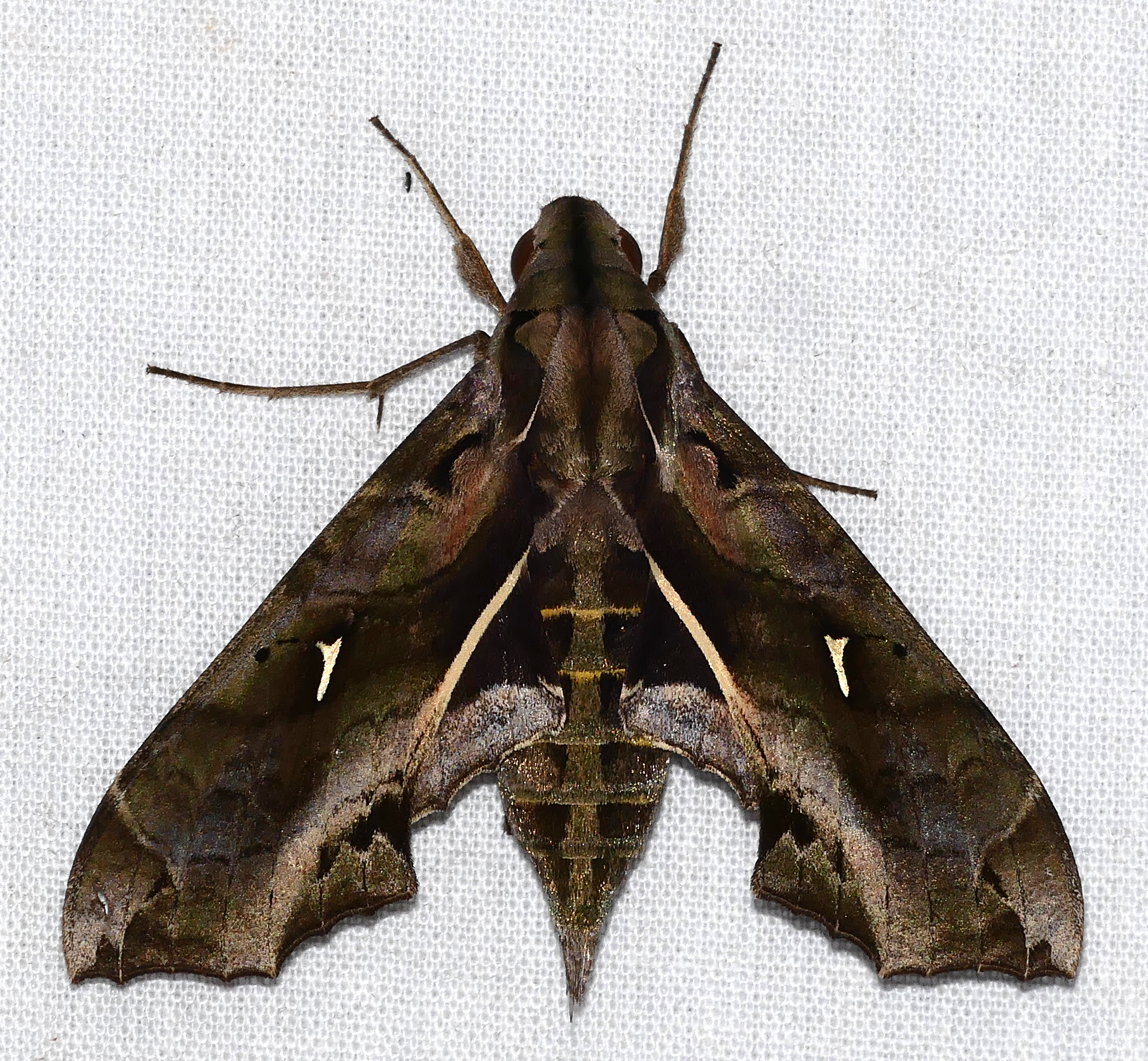

Scientific classification
- Domain: Eukaryota
- Kingdom: Animalia
- Phylum: Arthropoda
- Class: Insecta
- Order: Lepidoptera
- Family: Sphingidae
- Genus: Hemeroplanes
- Species: H. ornatus

Binomial name
- Hemeroplanes ornatus Rothschild, 1894

Synonyms
- Leucorampha ornatus Rothschild, 1894

= Hemeroplanes ornatus =

Species of moth

Hemeroplanes ornatus is a species of sphinx moth native from Mexico through northern South America. The species was first described by Walter Rothschild in 1894.

== Description ==
H. ornatus is mainly light brownish gray with green, pink, and dark brown markings. In the forewing cell, there is a short silver mark. There is a greenish-brown stripe running the length of the abdomen, with three yellow lateral stripes on the second, third, and fourth segments.

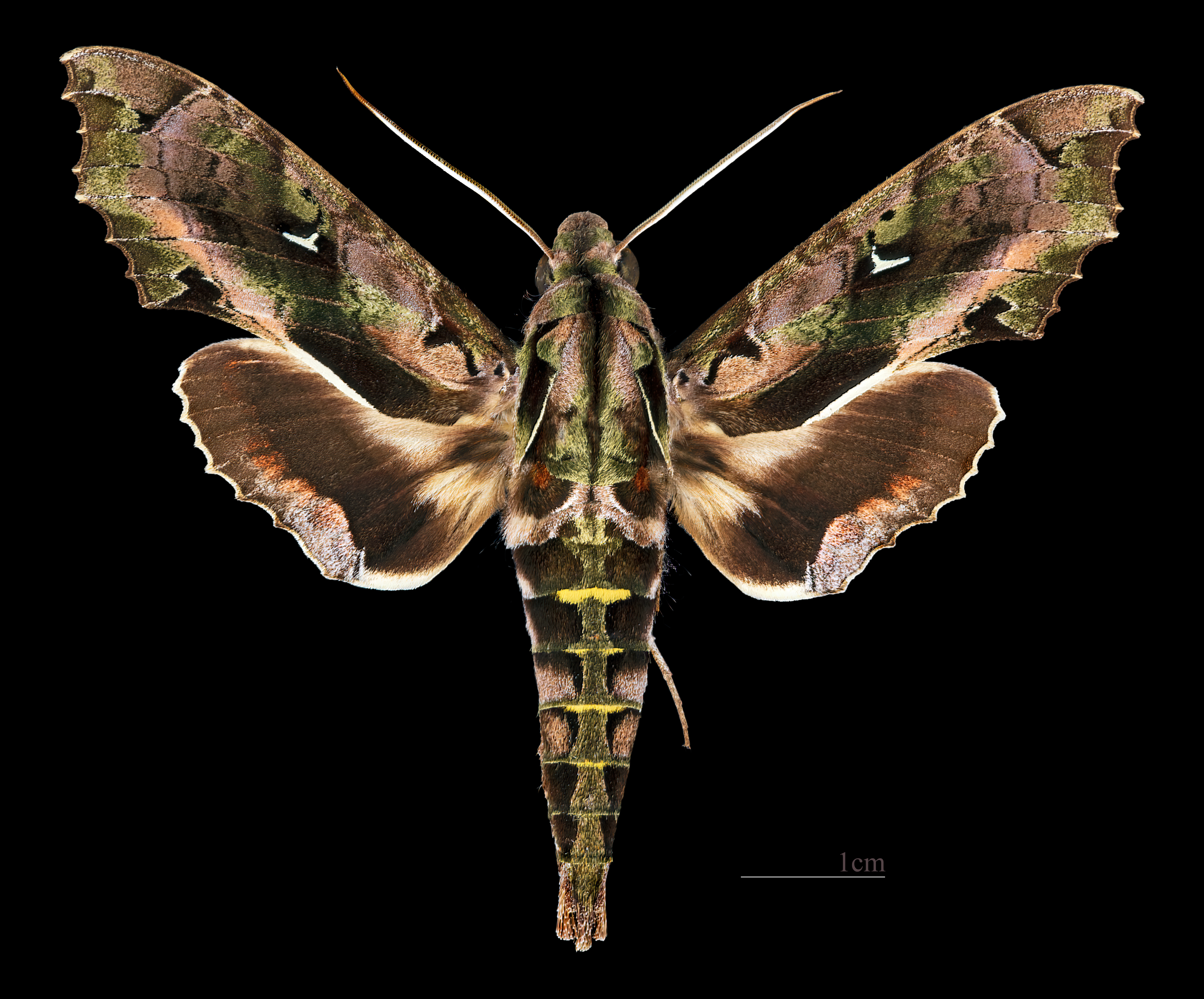
Hemeroplanes ornatus ♂

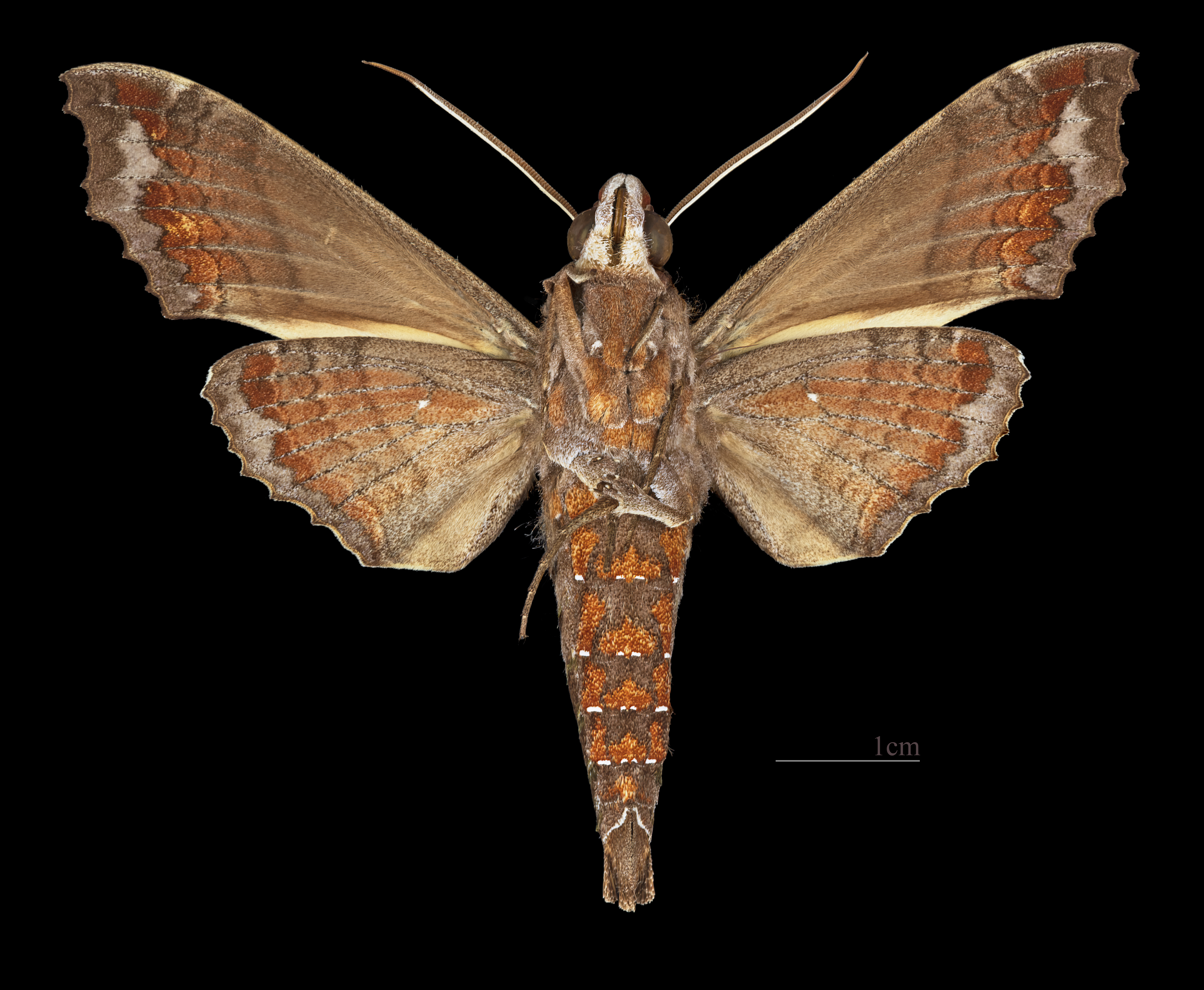
Hemeroplanes ornatus ♂ △

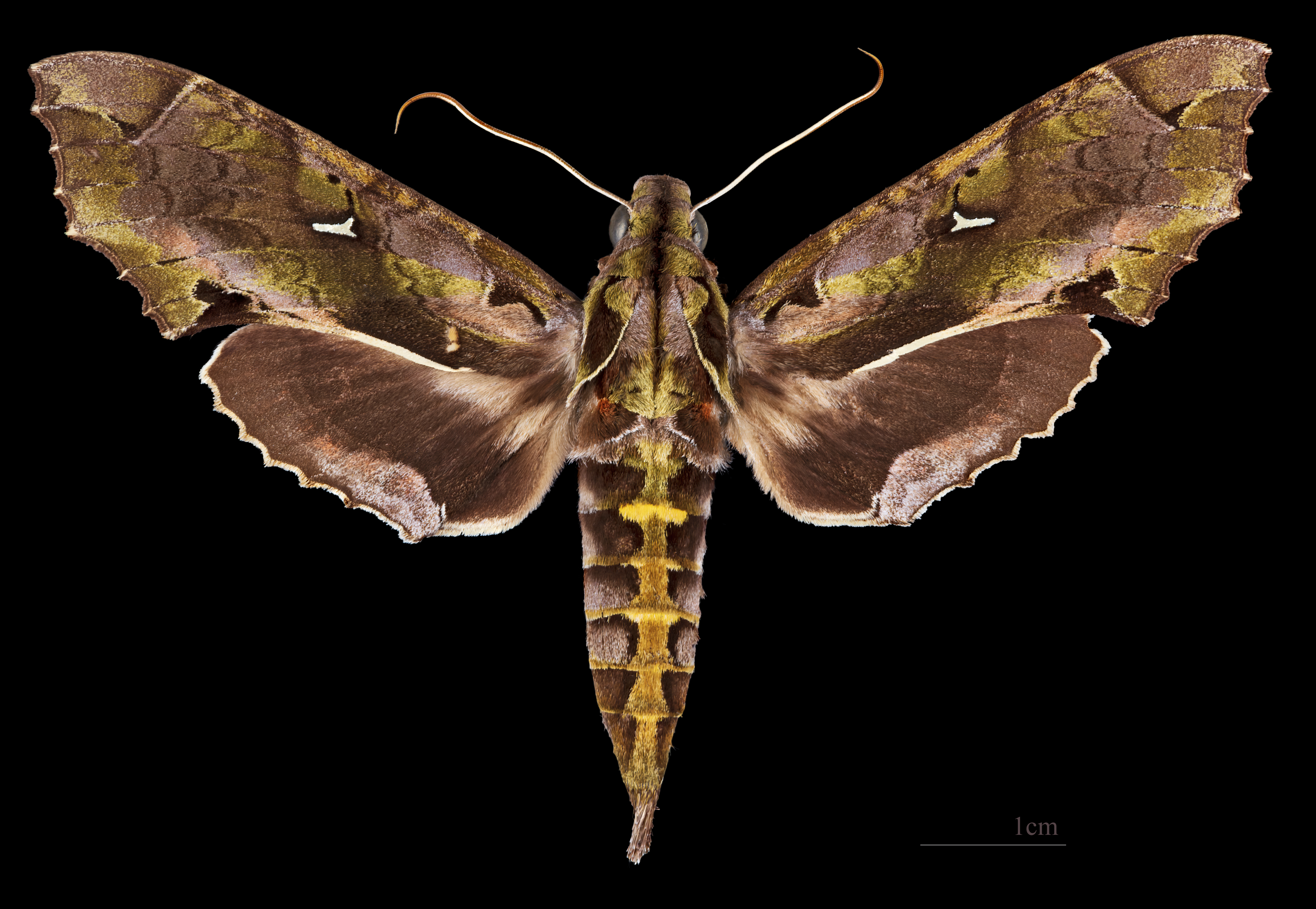
Hemeroplanes ornatus ♀

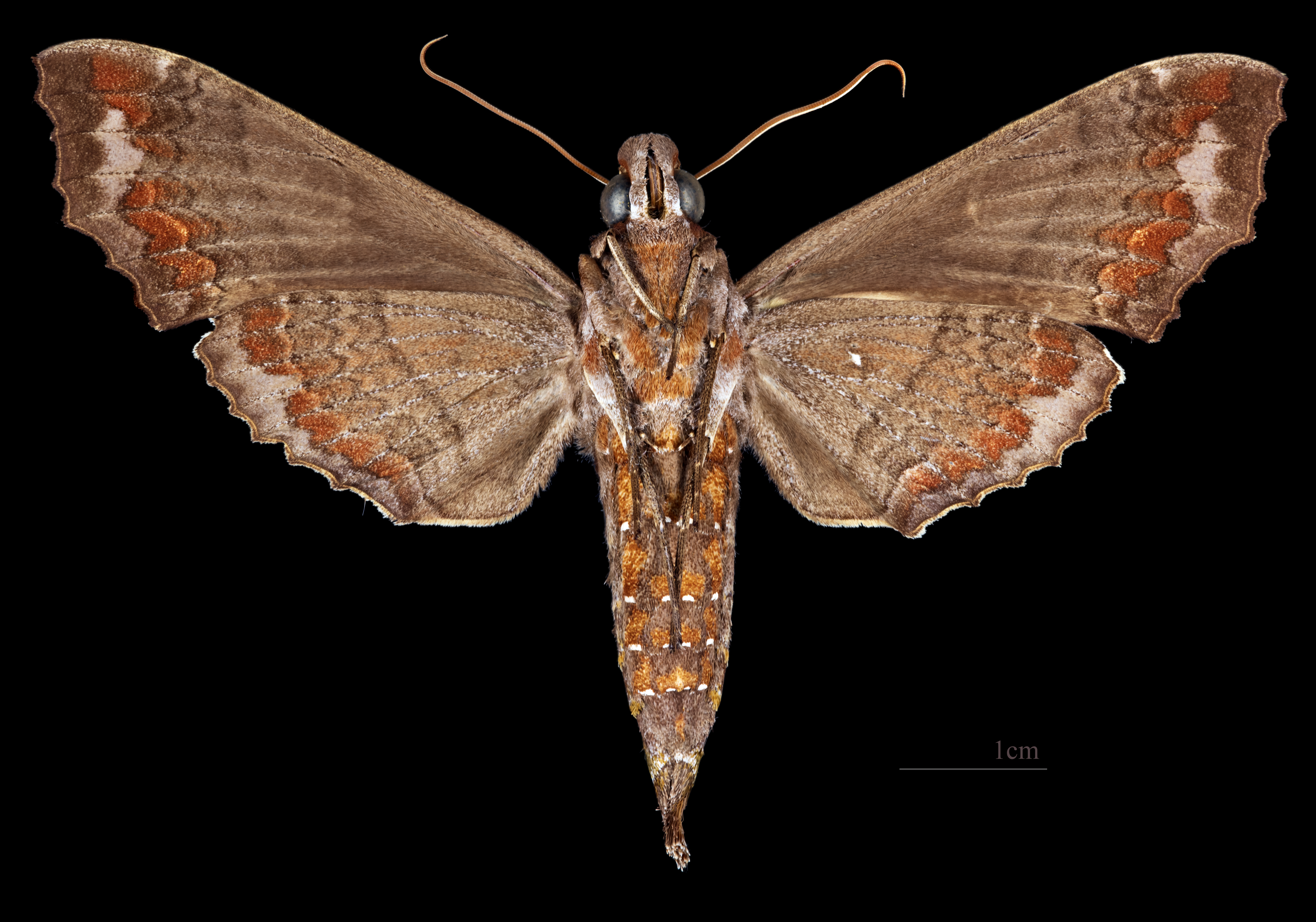
Hemeroplanes ornatus ♀ △

== Life cycle ==
The female releases pheromones to attract males. The caterpillar is green, camouflaged against its host plant Fischeria panamensis. However, when disturbed, the caterpillar hangs from the vine with his prolegs and puffs up its head and thorax. The underside of its body is brown, and it has a pair of false eyes on the thorax, making it look like a small snake. It will move back and forth and strike at predators.
