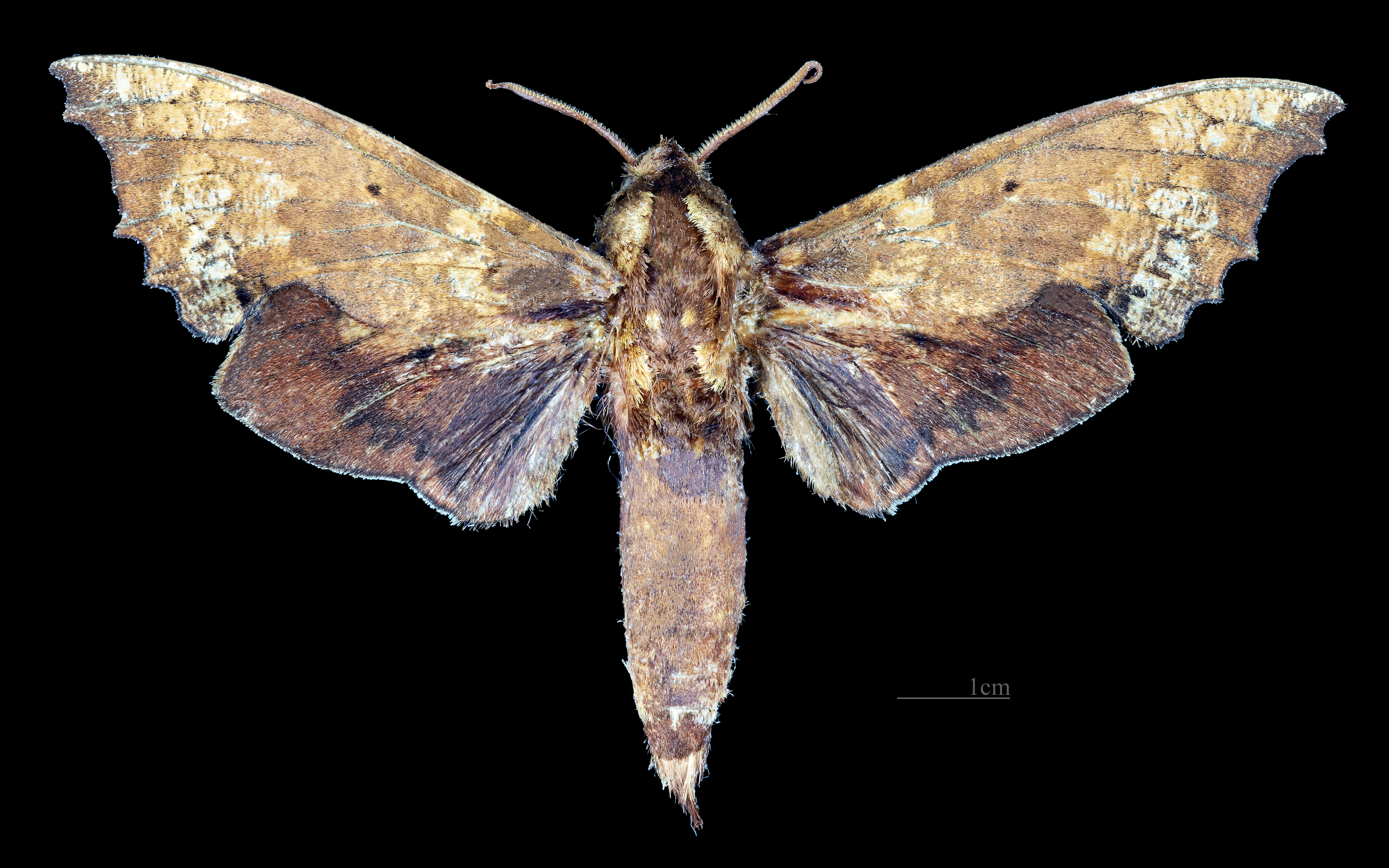
- Male dorsal view
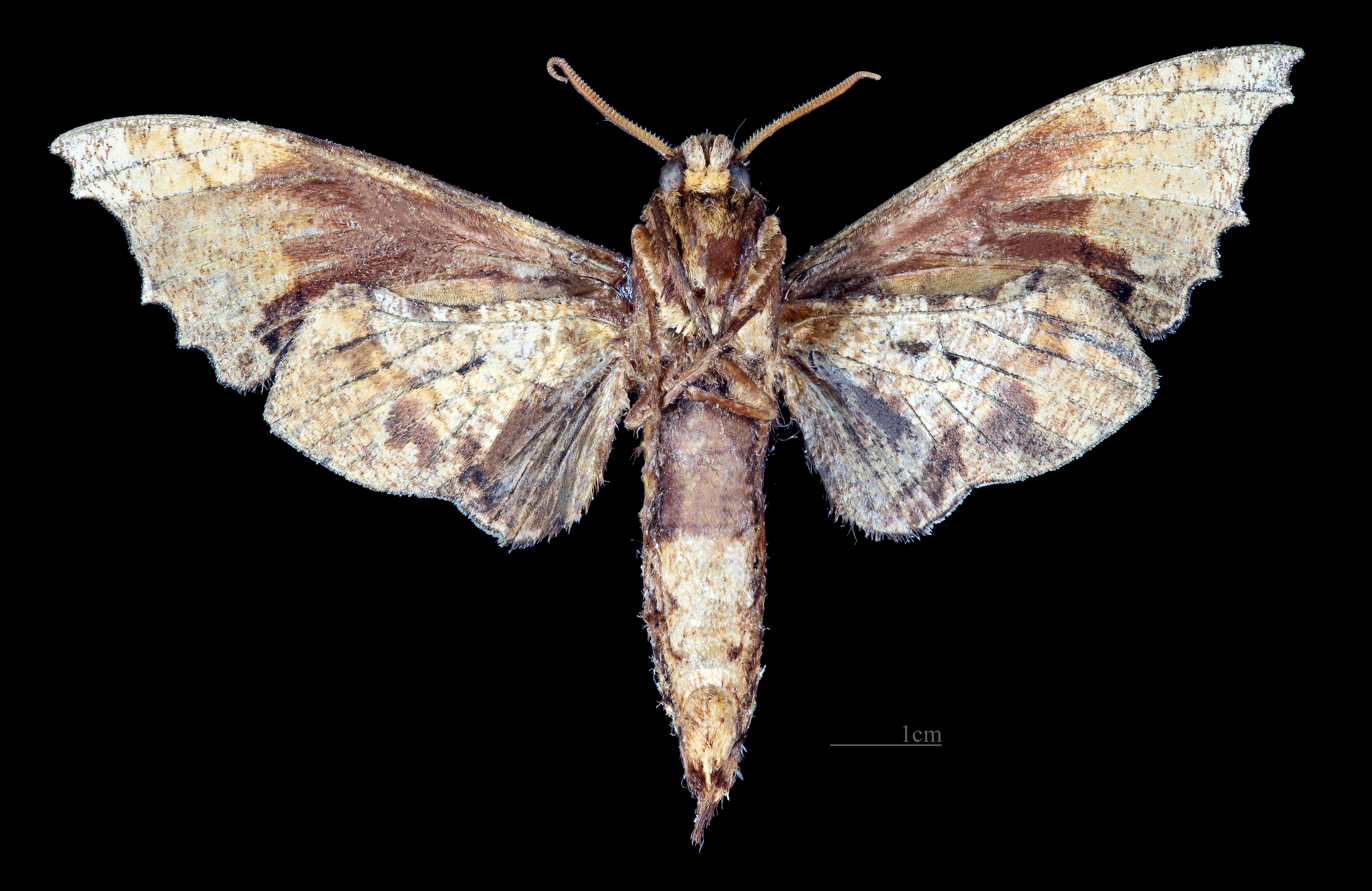
- Male ventral view

Scientific classification
- Domain: Eukaryota
- Kingdom: Animalia
- Phylum: Arthropoda
- Class: Insecta
- Order: Lepidoptera
- Family: Sphingidae
- Genus: Degmaptera
- Species: D. olivacea

Binomial name
- Degmaptera olivacea (Rothschild, 1894)

Synonyms
- Cypa olivacea Rothschild, 1894

= Degmaptera olivacea =

Species of moth

Degmaptera olivacea is a species of moth of the family Sphingidae first described by Walter Rothschild in 1894. It is known from Peninsular Malaysia and Borneo.

It is similar to Smerinthulus diehli, but the hindwings are less pink, the bands on the forewing are yellowish and the apex of the forewing is less strongly produced.

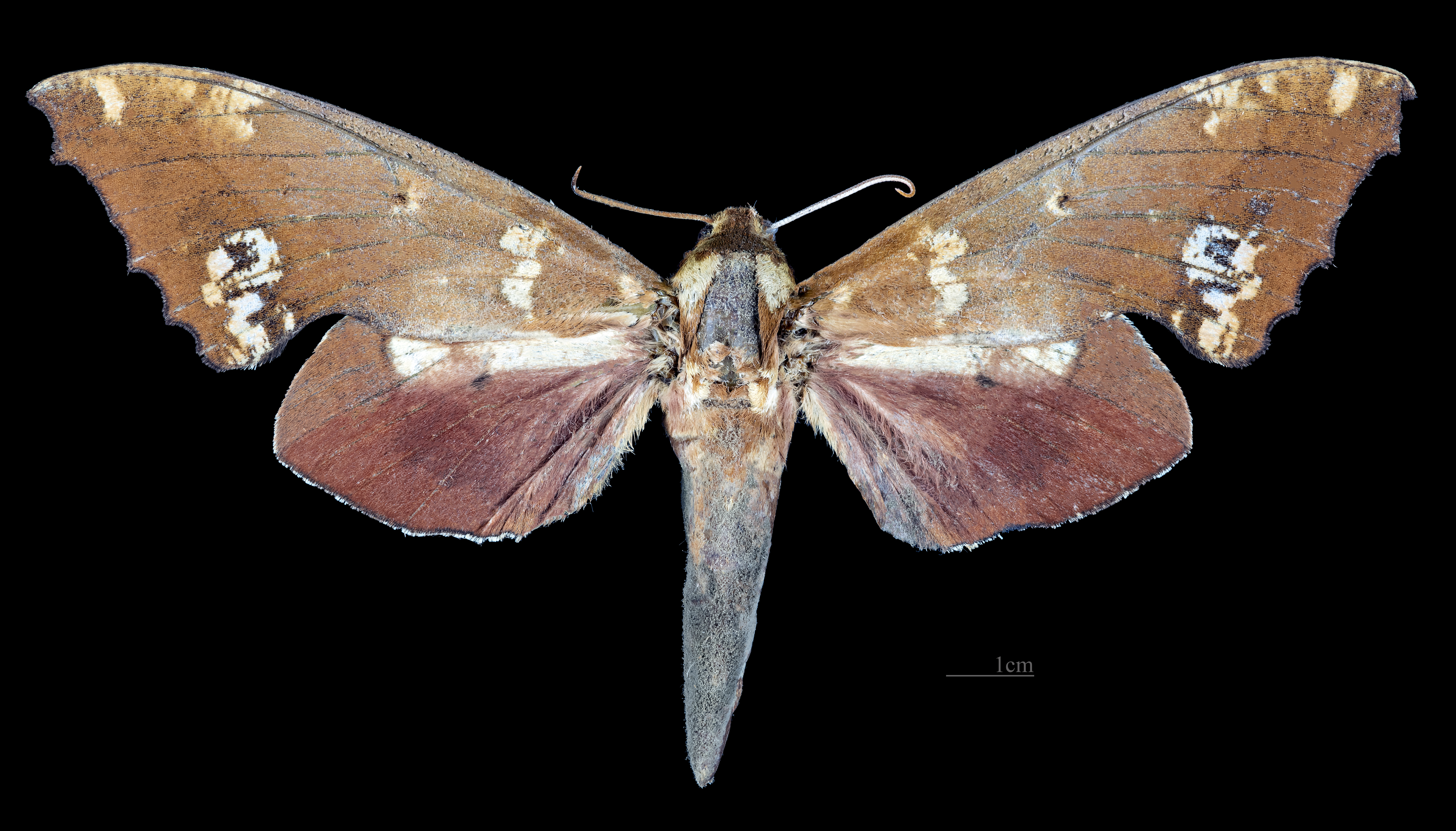
Female

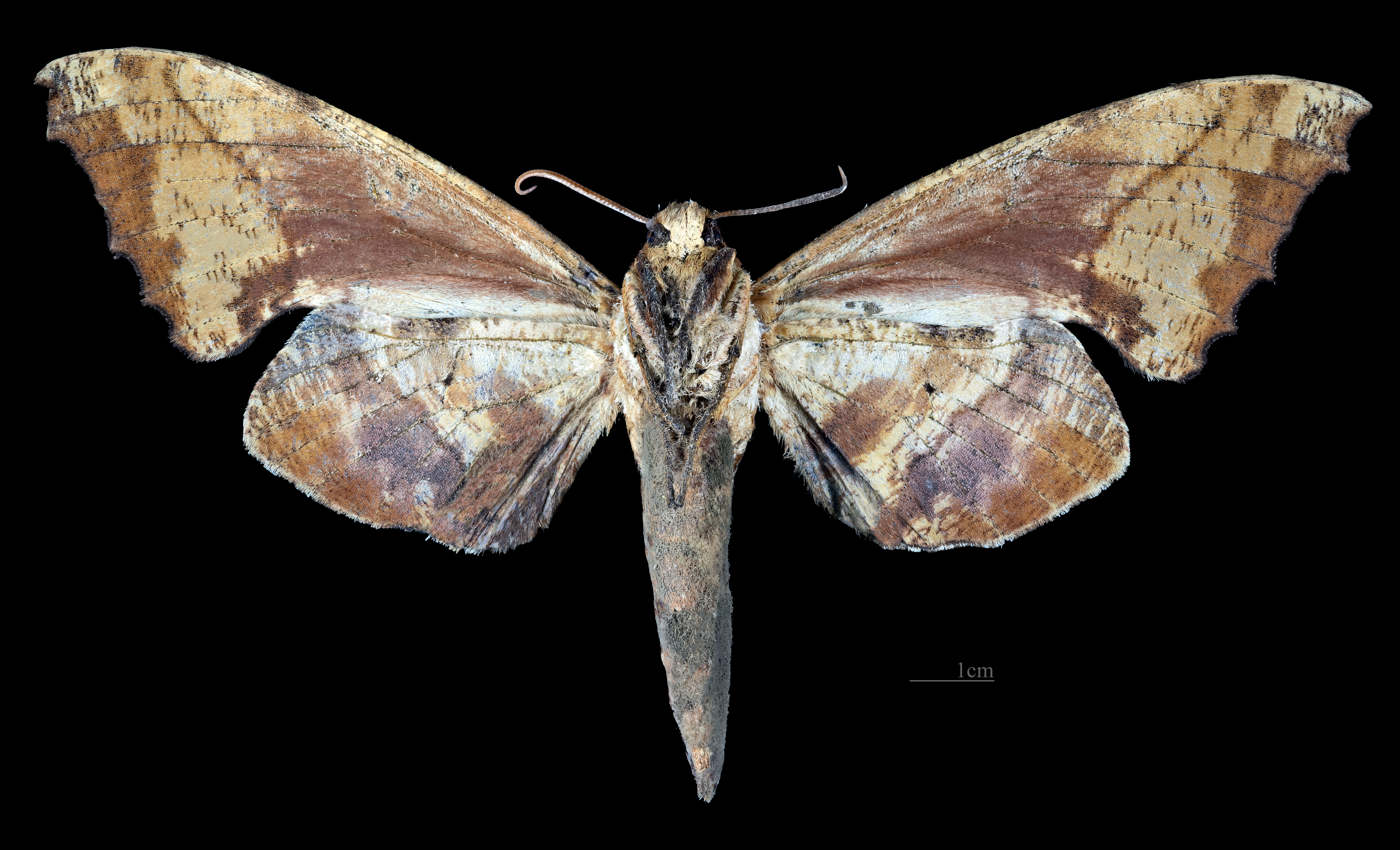
Female underside
