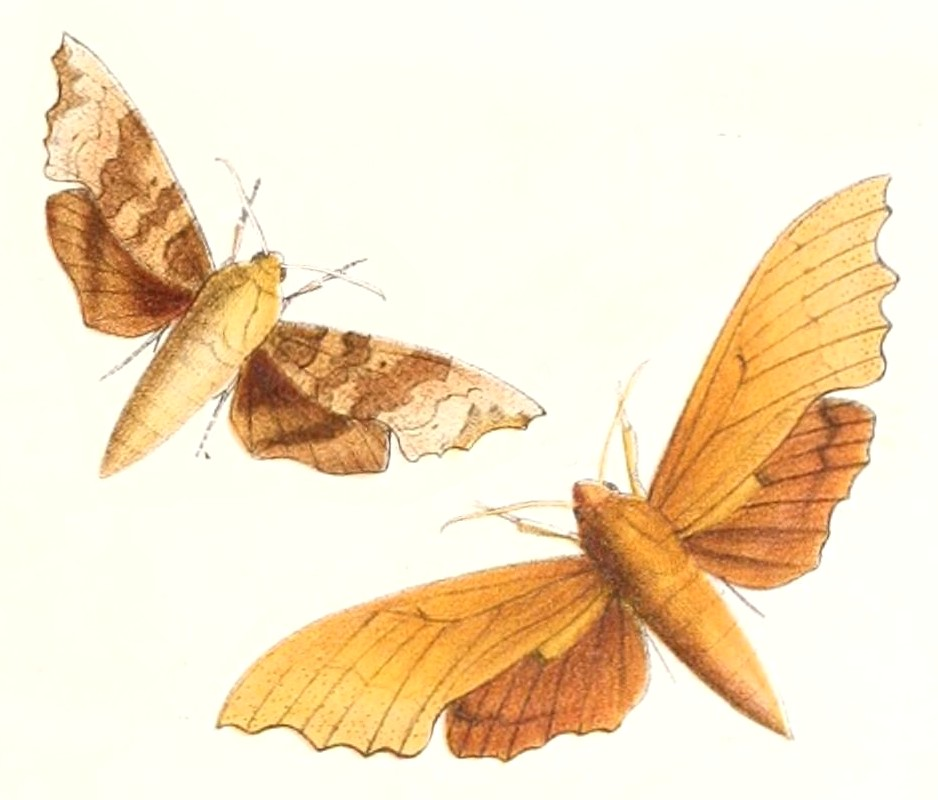
- Degmaptera olivacea - male and female

Scientific classification
- Domain: Eukaryota
- Kingdom: Animalia
- Phylum: Arthropoda
- Class: Insecta
- Order: Lepidoptera
- Family: Sphingidae
- Tribe: Smerinthini
- Genus: Degmaptera; Hampson, 1896

= Degmaptera =

Genus of moths

Degmaptera is a genus of moths in the family Sphingidae. The genus was erected by George Hampson in 1896.

== Species ==
- Degmaptera cadioui Brechlin & Kitching, 2009
- Degmaptera mirabilis (Rothschild, 1894)
- Degmaptera olivacea (Rothschild, 1894)
