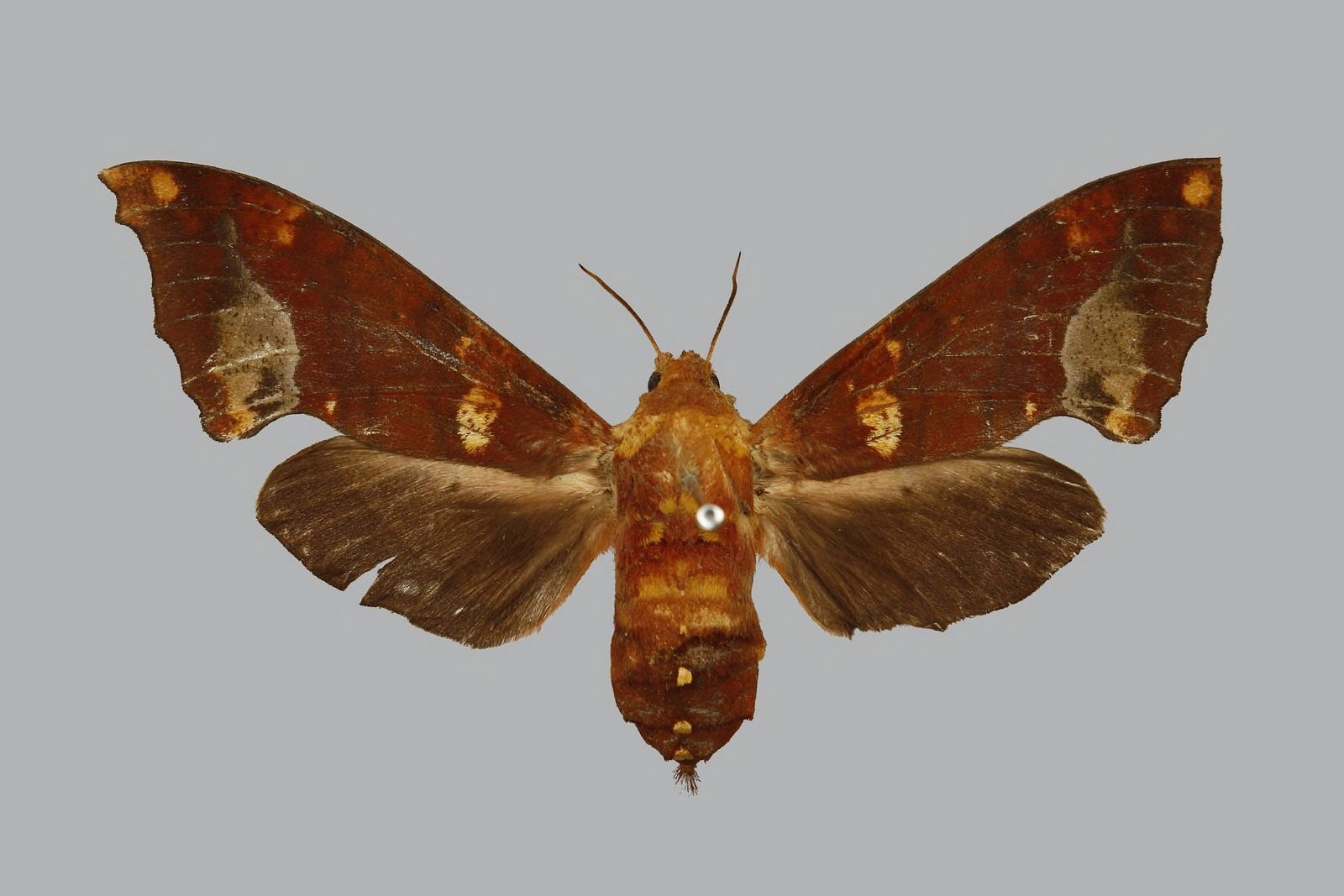

Scientific classification
- Kingdom: Animalia
- Phylum: Arthropoda
- Class: Insecta
- Order: Lepidoptera
- Family: Sphingidae
- Genus: Smerinthulus
- Species: S. dohrni

Binomial name
- Smerinthulus dohrni Rothschild & Jordan, 1903

= Smerinthulus dohrni =

Species of moth

Smerinthulus dohrni is a species of moth of the family Sphingidae. It is found in Malaysia and Sumatra.
