= Degmaptera cadioui =

Scientific classification
- Kingdom: Animalia
- Phylum: Arthropoda
- Clade: Pancrustacea
- Class: Insecta
- Order: Lepidoptera
- Family: Sphingidae
- Genus: Degmaptera
- Species: D. cadioui

Binomial name
- Degmaptera cadioui Brechlin & Kitching, 2009

Species of moth

Degmaptera cadioui is a species of moth of the family Sphingidae first described by Ronald Brechlin and Ian J. Kitching in 2009. It is known from the Philippines.
