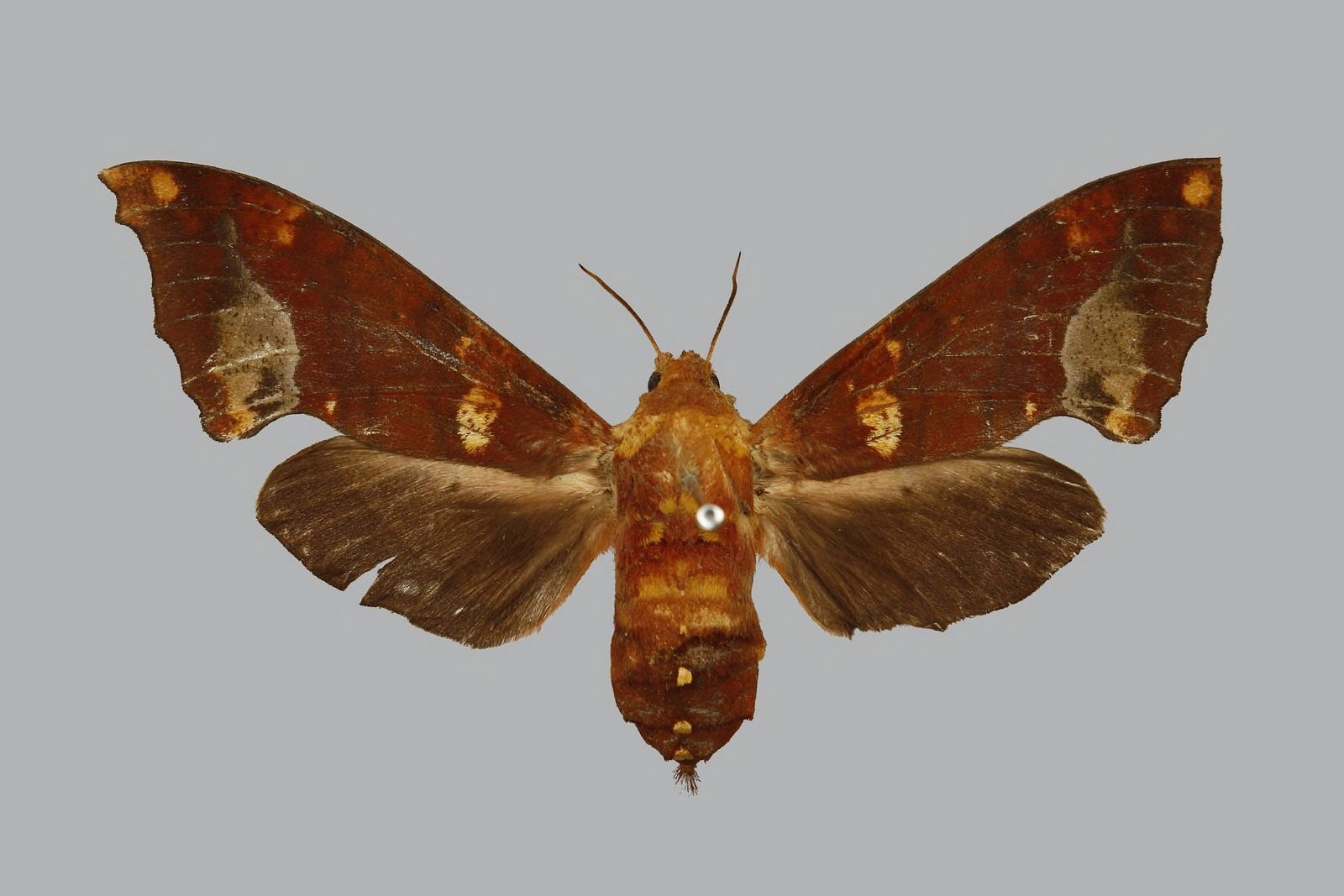
- Smerinthulus dohrni

Scientific classification
- Domain: Eukaryota
- Kingdom: Animalia
- Phylum: Arthropoda
- Class: Insecta
- Order: Lepidoptera
- Family: Sphingidae
- Tribe: Smerinthini
- Genus: Smerinthulus; Huwe, 1895

= Smerinthulus =

Genus of moths

Smerinthulus is a genus of moths in the family Sphingidae first described by Adolf Huwe in 1895.

== Species ==
- Smerinthulus designata Clark, 1928
- Smerinthulus diehli Hayes, 1982
- Smerinthulus dohrni Rothschild & Jordan, 1903
- Smerinthulus myanmarensis Brechlin, 2000
- Smerinthulus perversa (Rothschild, 1895)
- Smerinthulus quadripunctatus Huwe, 1895
- Smerinthulus witti Brechlin, 2000
