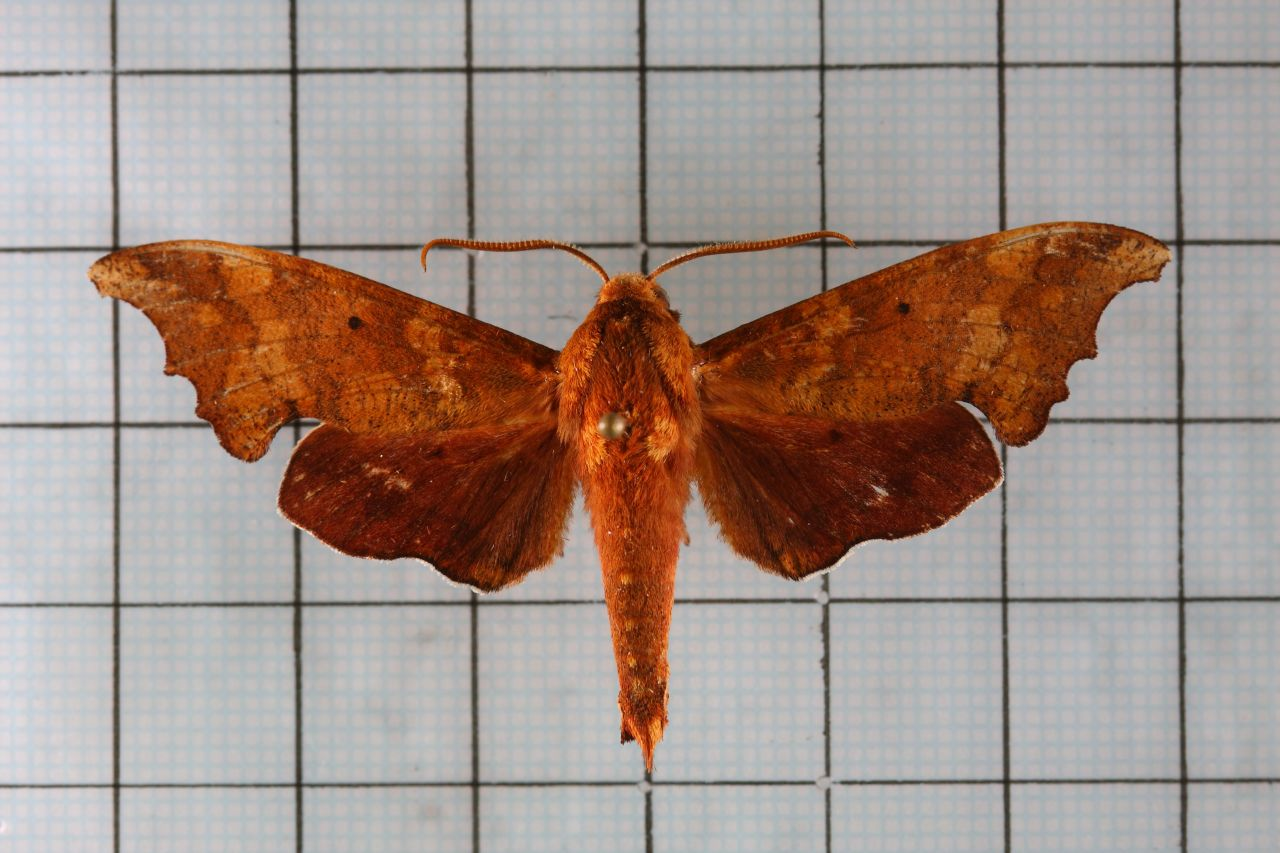
- Smerinthulus perversa flavomaculatus

Scientific classification
- Domain: Eukaryota
- Kingdom: Animalia
- Phylum: Arthropoda
- Class: Insecta
- Order: Lepidoptera
- Family: Sphingidae
- Genus: Smerinthulus
- Species: S. perversa

Binomial name
- Smerinthulus perversa (Rothschild, 1895)

Synonyms
- Cypa perversa Rothschild, 1895; Smerinthulus doipuiensis Inoue, 1991

= Smerinthulus perversa =

Species of moth

Smerinthulus perversa, the lichenous hawkmoth, is a species of moth of the family Sphingidae. It is known from Taiwan, Nepal, north-eastern India, northern Myanmar, south-western and southern China and Thailand.

The wingspan is 62–90 mm.

== Subspecies ==
- Smerinthulus perversa perversa (Nepal, north-eastern India, northern Myanmar, south-western China and Thailand)
- Smerinthulus perversa flavomaculatus Inoue, 1990 (Taiwan)
- Smerinthulus perversa pallidus Mell, 1922 (southern China)
