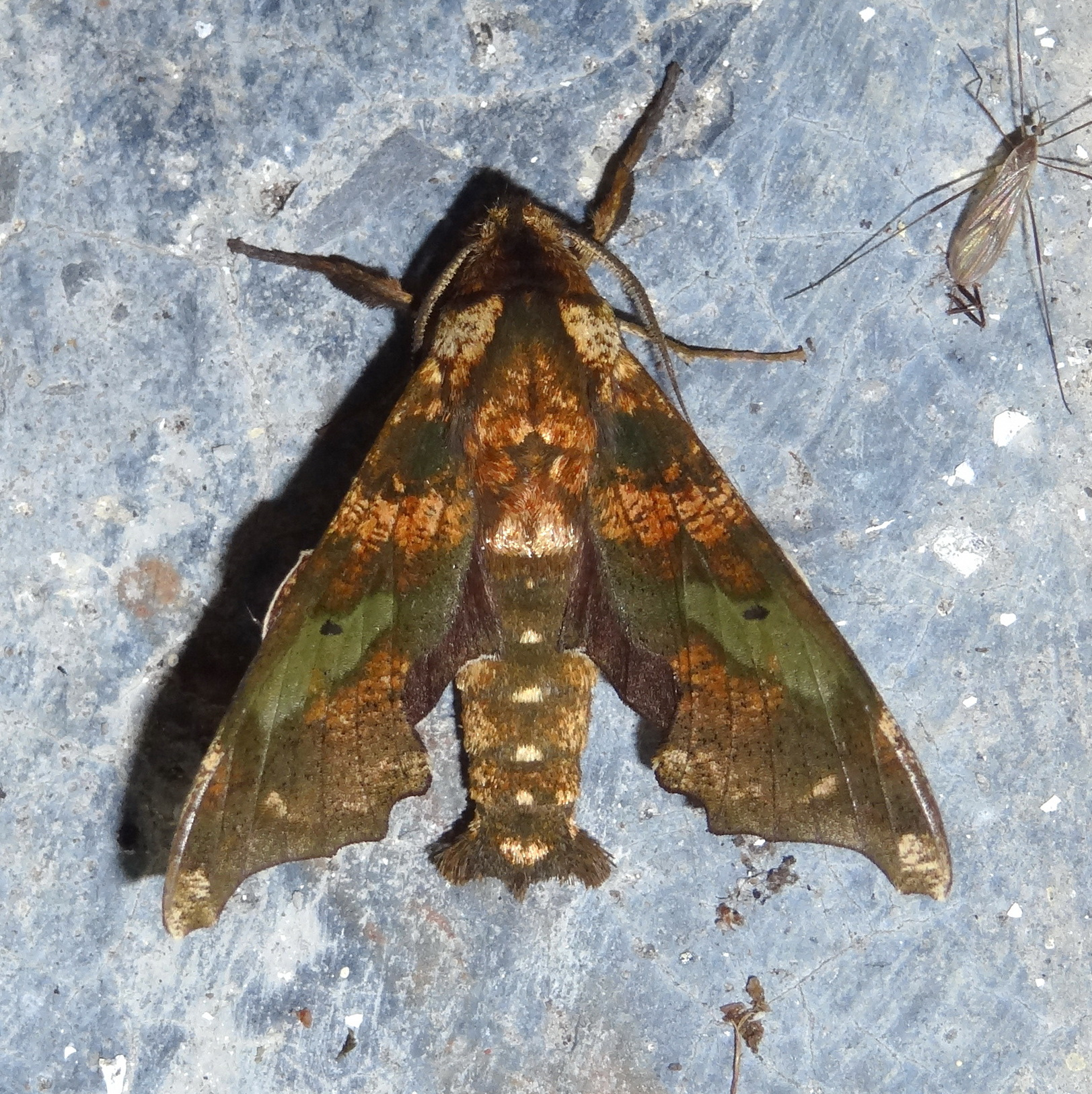

Scientific classification
- Domain: Eukaryota
- Kingdom: Animalia
- Phylum: Arthropoda
- Class: Insecta
- Order: Lepidoptera
- Family: Sphingidae
- Genus: Degmaptera
- Species: D. mirabilis

Binomial name
- Degmaptera mirabilis (Rothschild, 1894)

Synonyms
- Cypa mirabilis Rothschild, 1894

= Degmaptera mirabilis =

Species of moth

Degmaptera mirabilis, the variegated hawkmoth, is a species of moth of the family Sphingidae. It is known from Nepal, north-eastern India, northern Thailand, Anhui in China and Taiwan. The habitat consists of high altitude evergreen oak forests.

The wingspan is 44–82 mm.

The larvae have been recorded feeding on Quercus fenestrata in the Khasi Hills in India

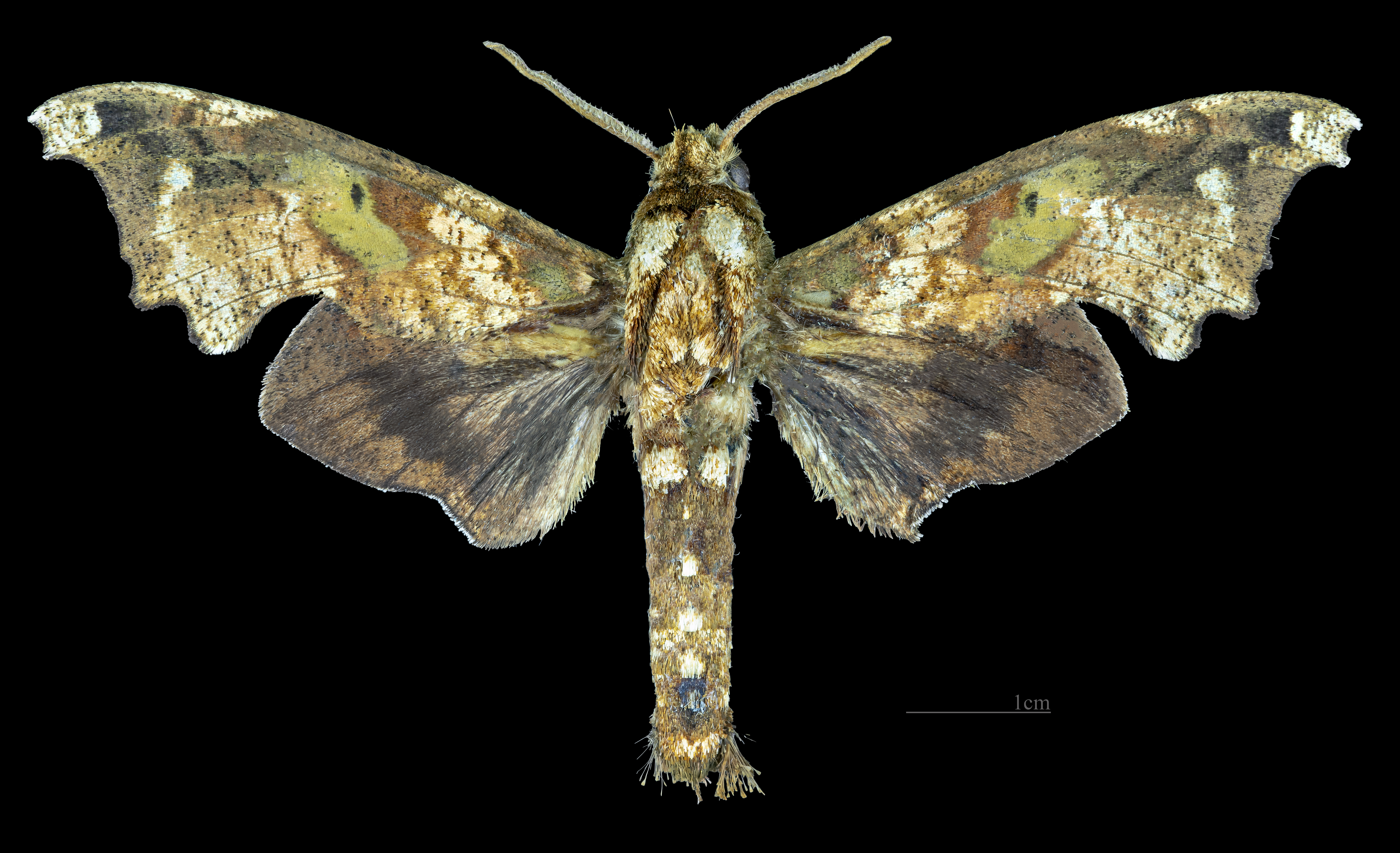
Male

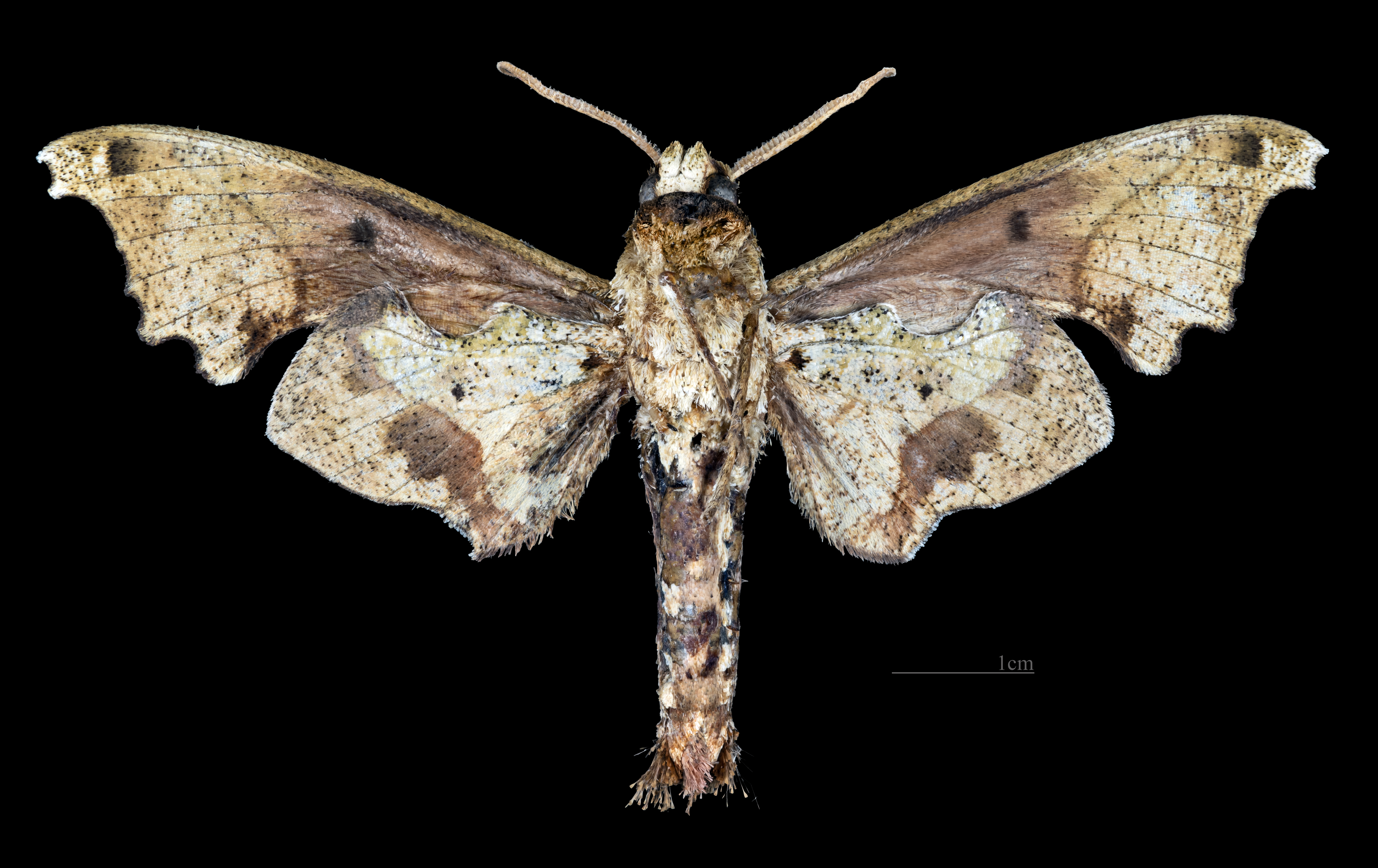
Male underside
