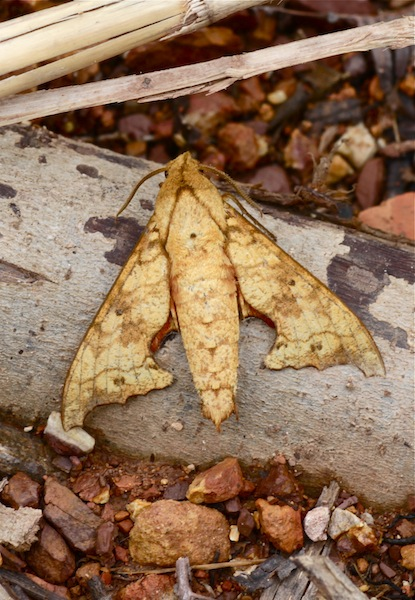
- From Borneo

Scientific classification
- Domain: Eukaryota
- Kingdom: Animalia
- Phylum: Arthropoda
- Class: Insecta
- Order: Lepidoptera
- Family: Sphingidae
- Genus: Smerinthulus
- Species: S. quadripunctatus

Binomial name
- Smerinthulus quadripunctatus Huwe, 1895

= Smerinthulus quadripunctatus =

Species of moth

Smerinthulus quadripunctatus is a species of moth of the family Sphingidae first described by Huwe in 1895. It is known from Thailand and Sundaland.

== Subspecies ==
- Smerinthulus quadripunctatus quadripunctatus (Sundaland)
- Smerinthulus quadripunctatus cottoni Cadiou & Kitching, 1990 (Thailand)
