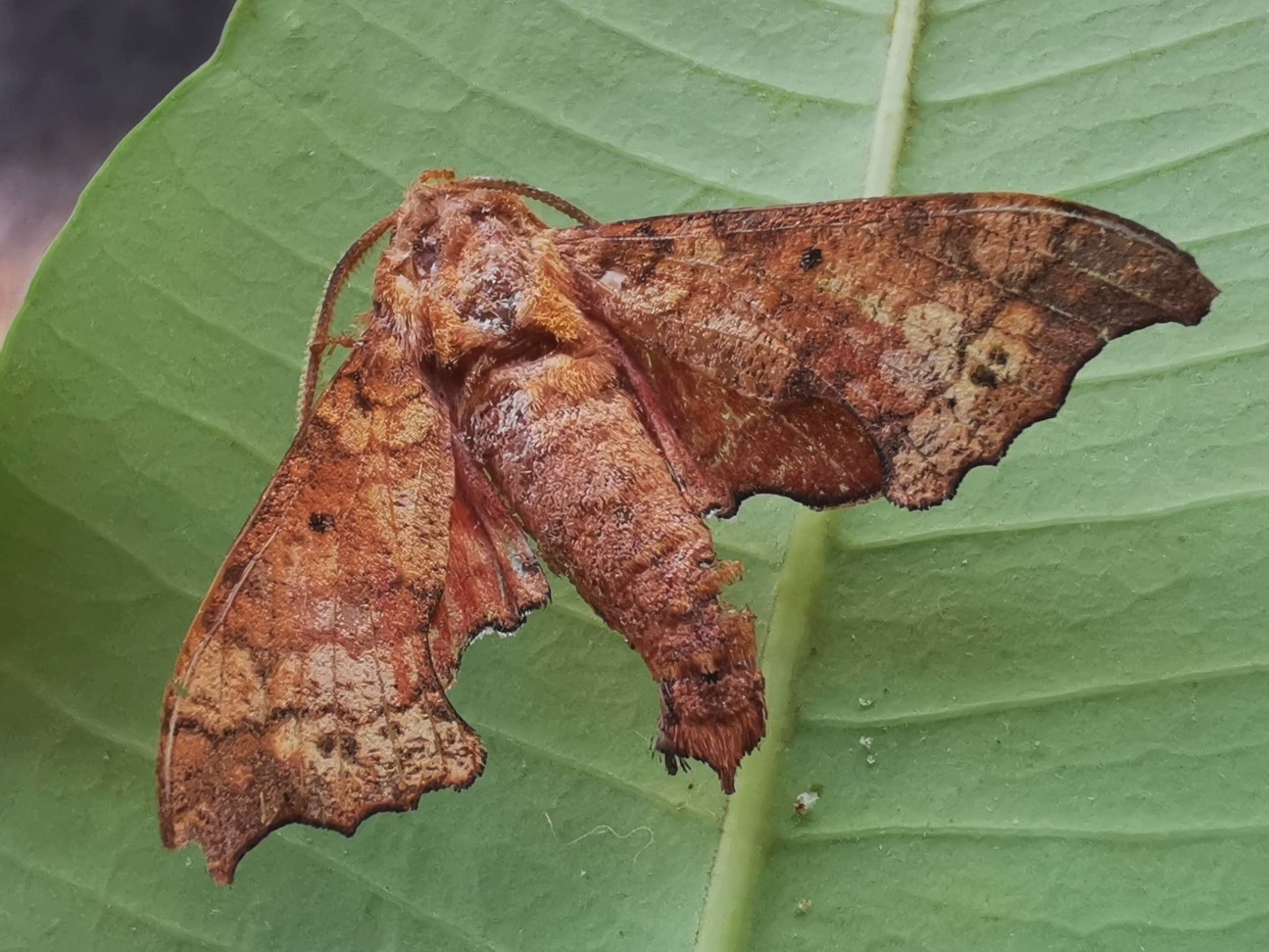

Scientific classification
- Kingdom: Animalia
- Phylum: Arthropoda
- Class: Insecta
- Order: Lepidoptera
- Family: Sphingidae
- Genus: Smerinthulus
- Species: S. myanmarensis

Binomial name
- Smerinthulus myanmarensis Brechlin, 2000

= Smerinthulus myanmarensis =

Species of moth

Smerinthulus myanmarensis is a species of moth in the family Sphingidae. It is known from Malaysia and Myanmar.
