= Smerinthulus designata =

Scientific classification
- Domain: Eukaryota
- Kingdom: Animalia
- Phylum: Arthropoda
- Class: Insecta
- Order: Lepidoptera
- Family: Sphingidae
- Genus: Smerinthulus
- Species: S. designata

Binomial name
- Smerinthulus designata Clark, 1928

Species of moth

Smerinthulus designata is a species of moth of the family Sphingidae. It is known from China.
