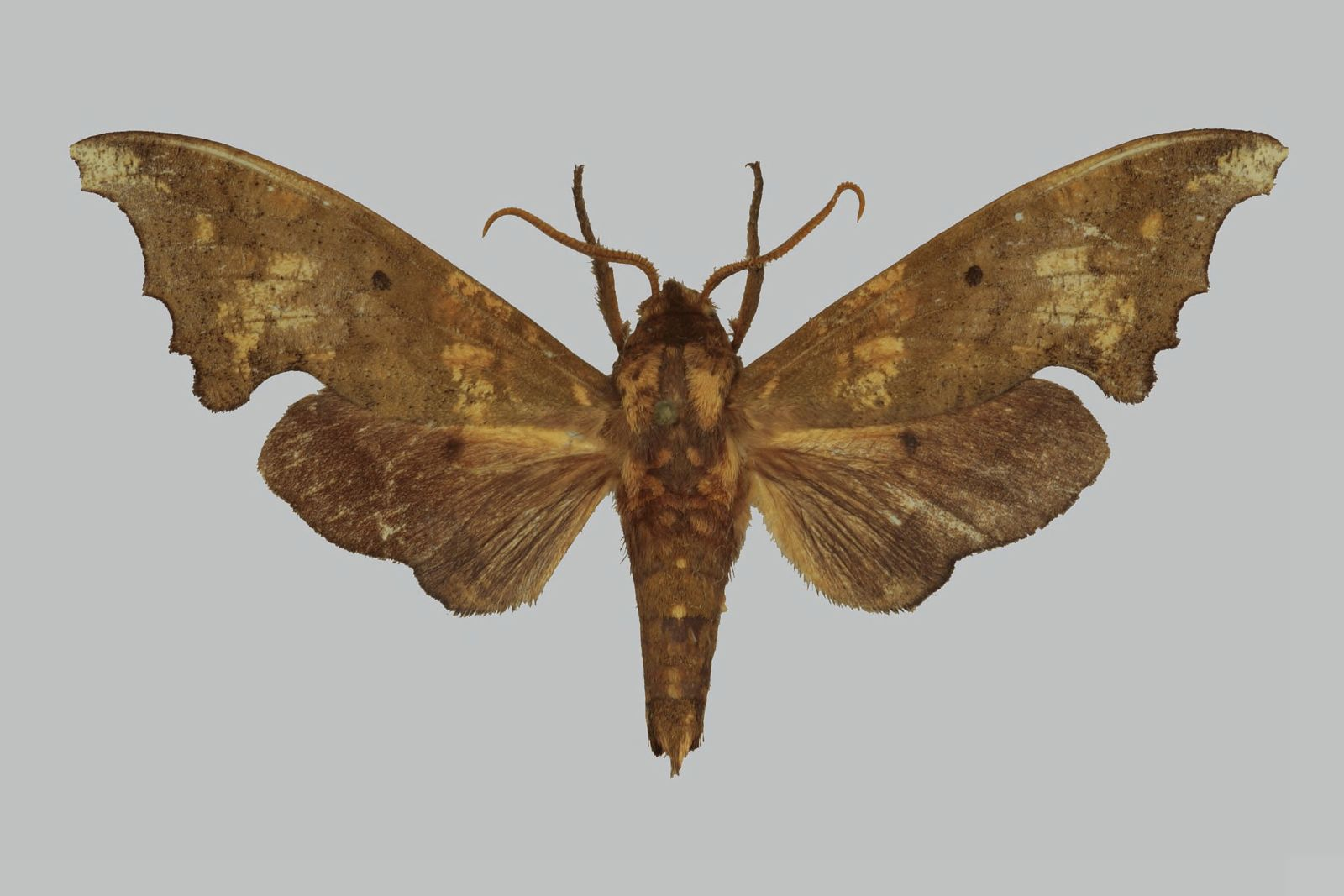

Scientific classification
- Kingdom: Animalia
- Phylum: Arthropoda
- Class: Insecta
- Order: Lepidoptera
- Family: Sphingidae
- Genus: Smerinthulus
- Species: S. witti

Binomial name
- Smerinthulus witti Brechlin, 2000

= Smerinthulus witti =

Species of moth

Smerinthulus witti is a species of moth of the family Sphingidae. It is known from Yunnan and Guangxi in China.
