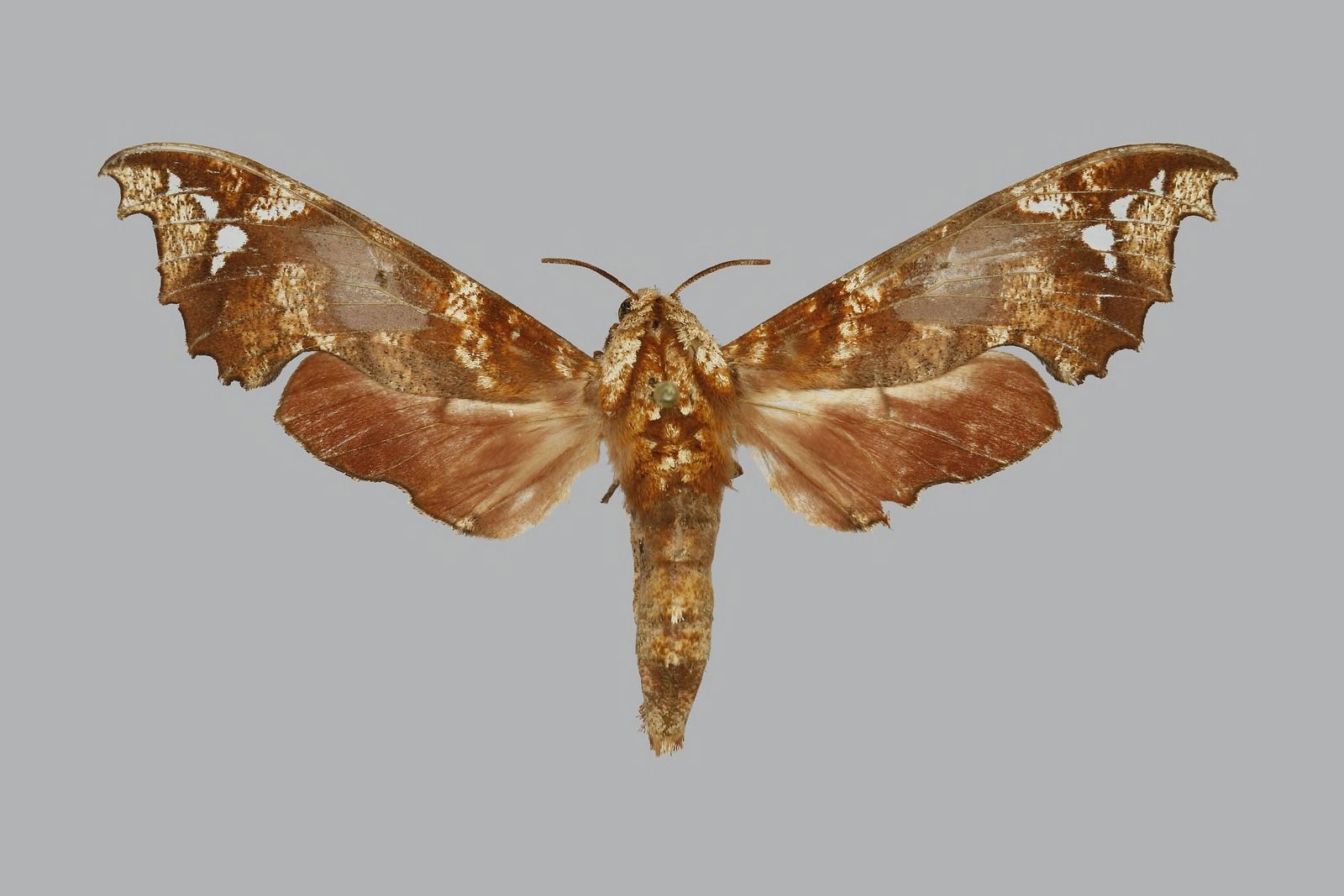

Scientific classification
- Domain: Eukaryota
- Kingdom: Animalia
- Phylum: Arthropoda
- Class: Insecta
- Order: Lepidoptera
- Family: Sphingidae
- Genus: Smerinthulus
- Species: S. diehli

Binomial name
- Smerinthulus diehli Hayes, 1982

= Smerinthulus diehli =

Species of moth

Smerinthulus diehli is a species of moth of the family Sphingidae first described by Hayes in 1982. It is known from Thailand, Malaysia and Indonesia (Sumatra and Borneo).
