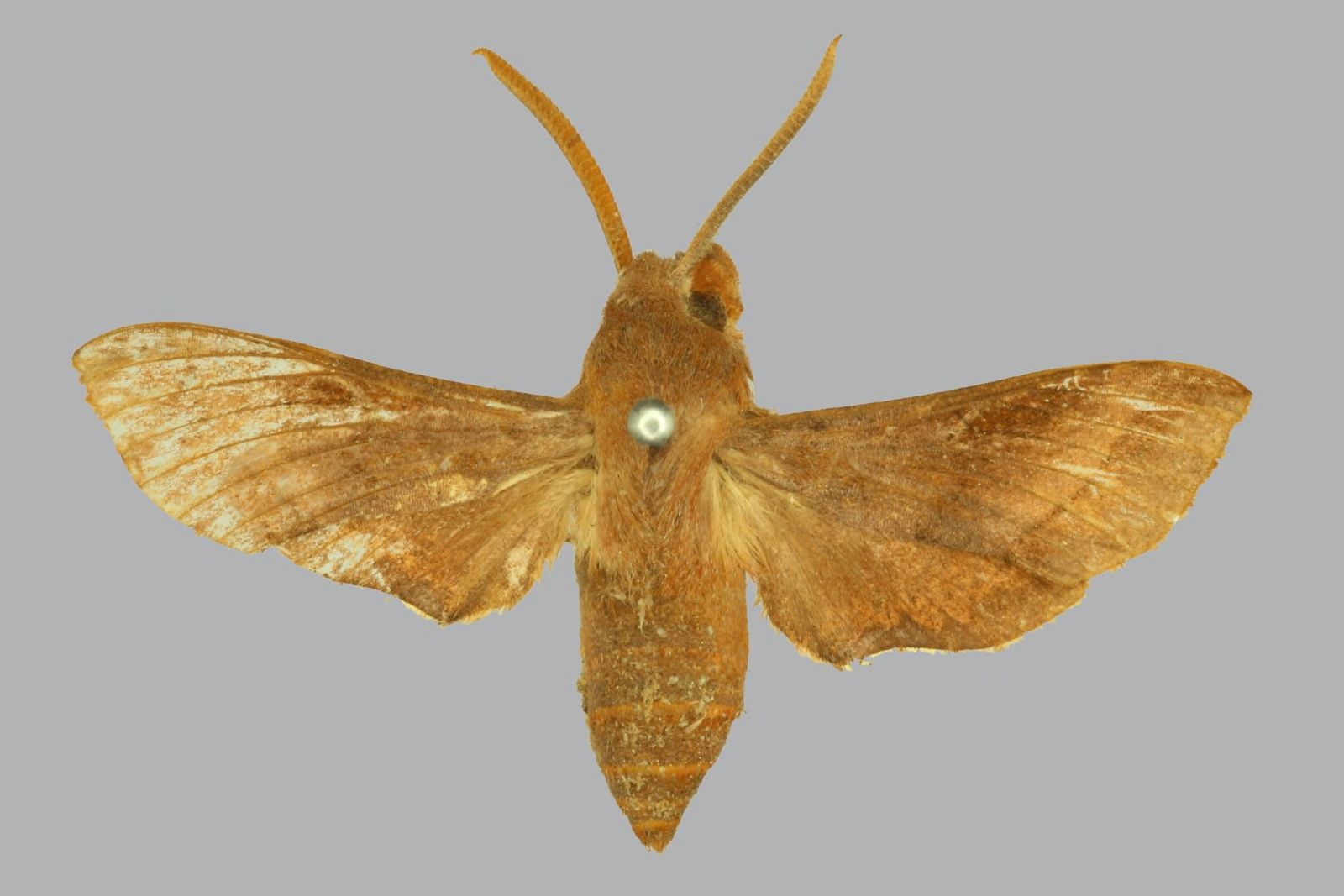
- Male

Scientific classification
- Kingdom: Animalia
- Phylum: Arthropoda
- Class: Insecta
- Order: Lepidoptera
- Family: Sphingidae
- Genus: Basiothia
- Species: B. laticornis

Binomial name
- Basiothia laticornis (Butler, 1879)

Synonyms
- Gnathostypsis laticornis Butler, 1879; Chaerocampa bifasciata Mabile, 1879

= Basiothia laticornis =

Species of moth

Basiothia laticornis is a moth of the family Sphingidae. It is only known from Madagascar.

It is similar to Basiothia medea, but immediately distinguishable by the generally brown forewing and hindwing uppersides. The antennae are strongly clubbed in both sexes, but noticeably longer and thicker in the male. The forewing upperside is purplish-brown. There are three antemedian lines present. There is a darker brown patch distal to the apex of the discal cell.

The female has a wingspan of 35–40 mm.
