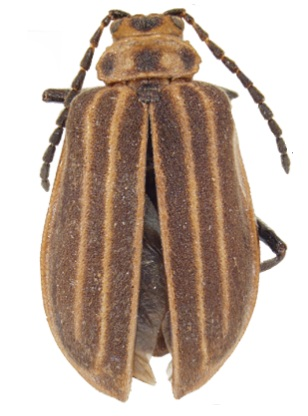

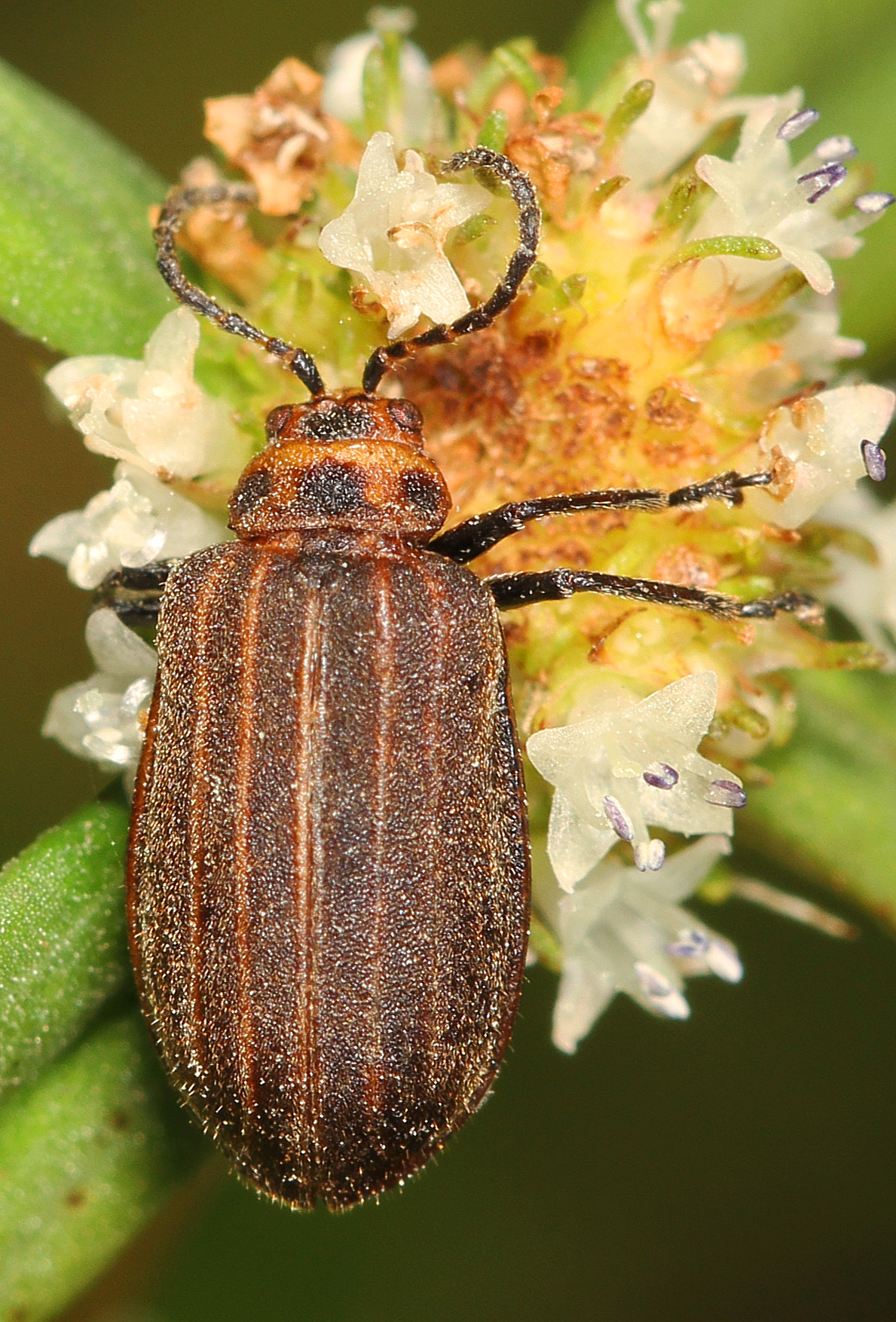

Scientific classification
- Kingdom: Animalia
- Phylum: Arthropoda
- Clade: Pancrustacea
- Class: Insecta
- Order: Coleoptera
- Suborder: Polyphaga
- Infraorder: Cucujiformia
- Family: Chrysomelidae
- Genus: Neolochmaea
- Species: N. obliterata

Binomial name
- Neolochmaea obliterata (Olivier, 1808)

Synonyms
- Galerucella obliterata Olivier, 1808; Yingaresca obliterata; Trirrhabda dilatipennis Jacoby, 1886; Neolochmaea dilatipennis; Ophraella dilatipennis

= Neolochmaea obliterata =

Species of beetle

Neolochmaea obliterata is a species of beetle of the family Chrysomelidae. It is found in the Neotropical region, but was introduced to southern Florida.

== Description ==
Adults reach a length of about 5.5‒7.6 mm.

== Biology ==
It has been recorded feeding on Spermacoce terminalis.
