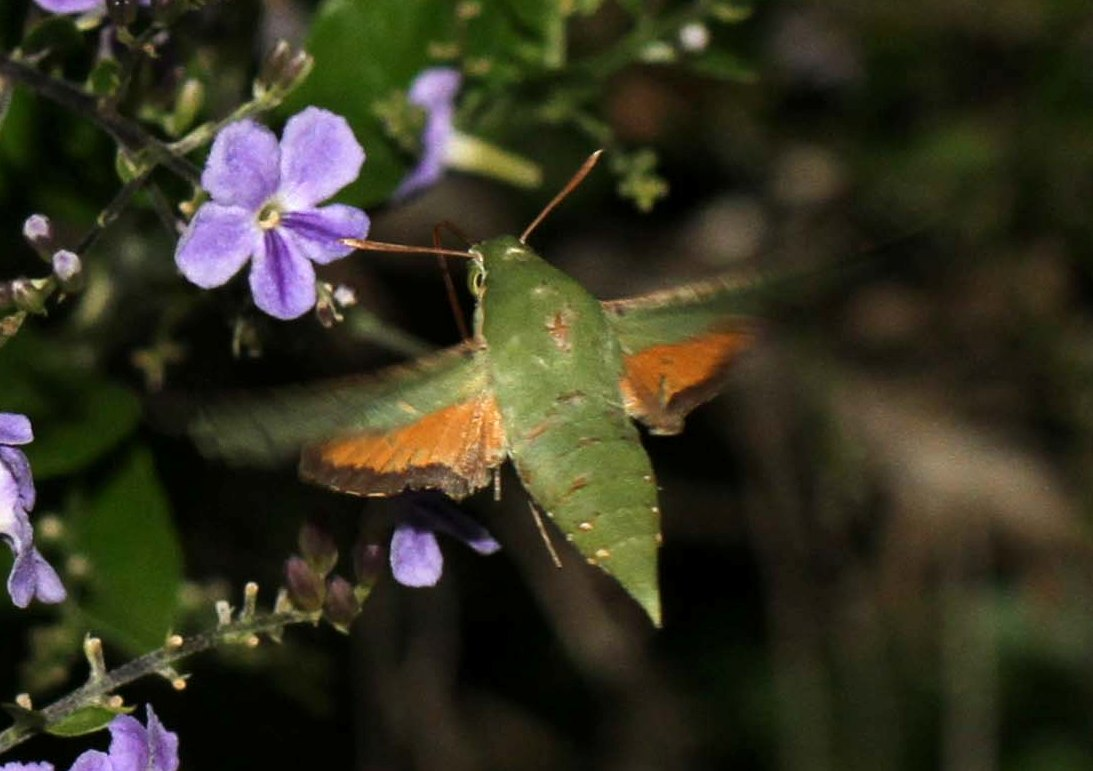
- Basiothia medea

Scientific classification
- Domain: Eukaryota
- Kingdom: Animalia
- Phylum: Arthropoda
- Class: Insecta
- Order: Lepidoptera
- Family: Sphingidae
- Subfamily: Macroglossinae
- Tribe: Macroglossini
- Genus: Basiothia; Walker, 1859

= Basiothia =

Genus of moths

Basiothia is a genus of moths in the family Sphingidae first described by Francis Walker in 1859.

== Species ==
- Basiothia aureata (Karsch, 1891)
- Basiothia charis (Walker, 1856)
- Basiothia laticornis (Butler, 1879)
- Basiothia medea (Fabricius, 1781)
- Basiothia schenki (Moschler, 1872)
