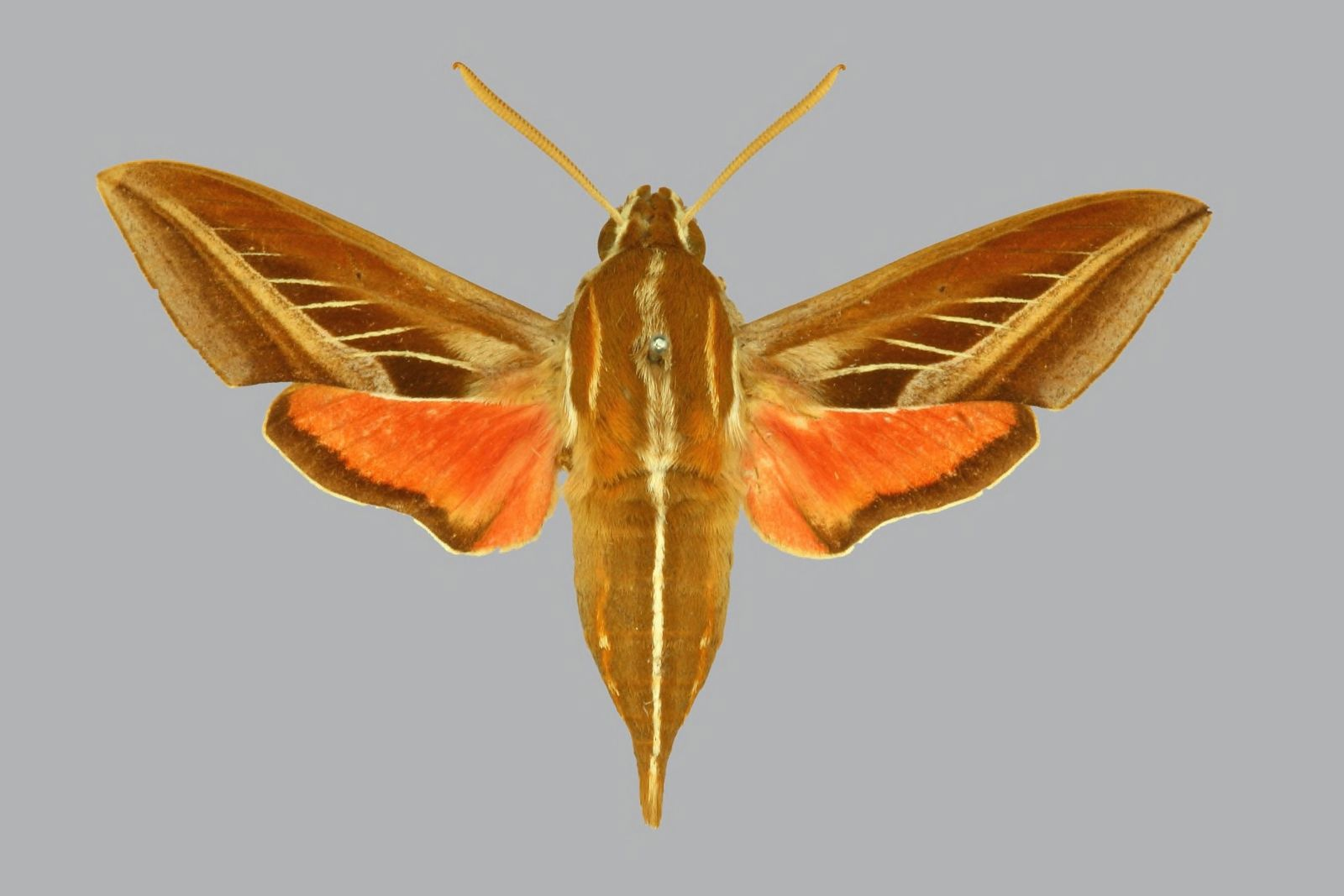

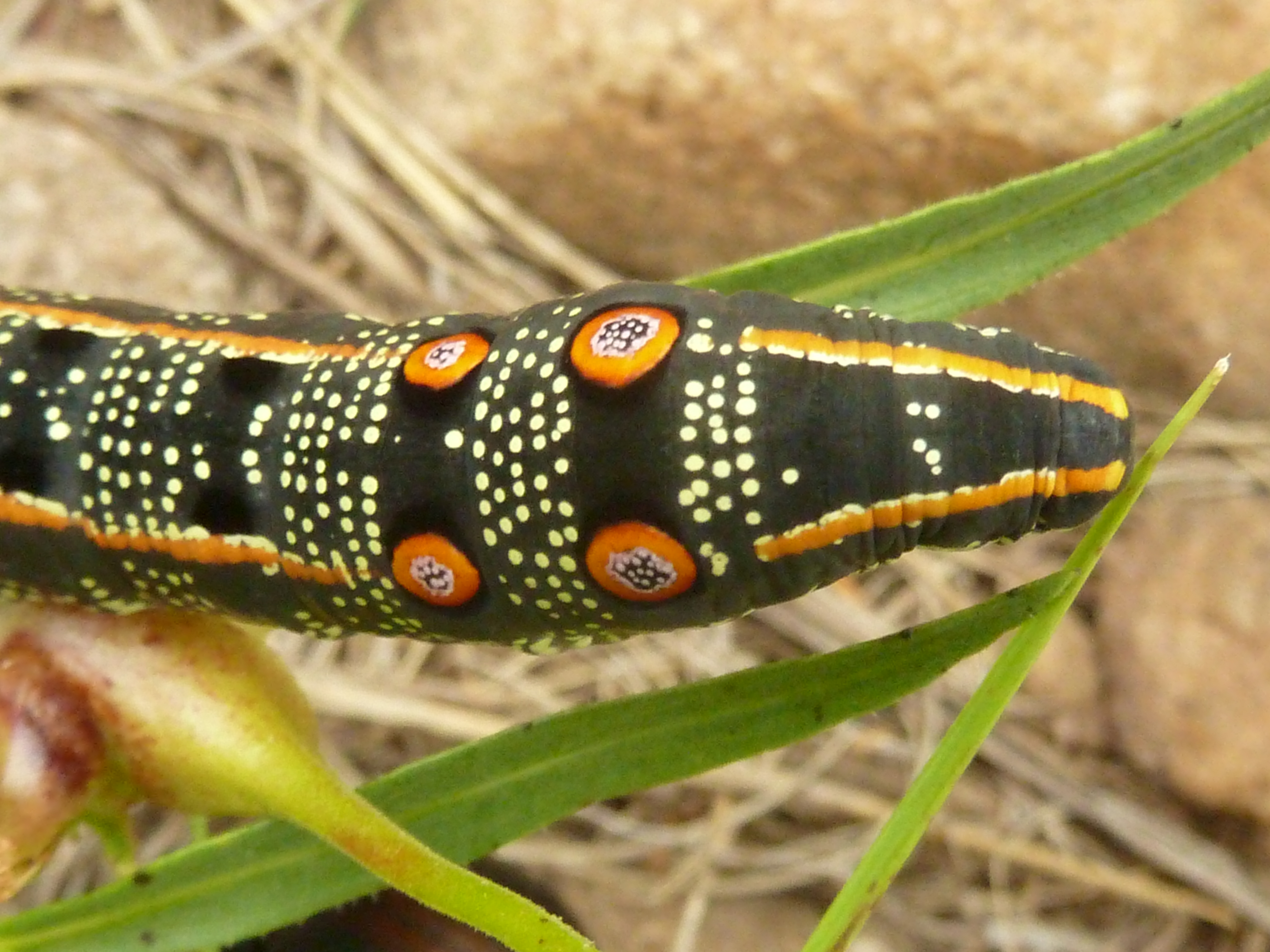
- Male imago (above) and caterpillar feeding on Pentanisia herb (below)

Scientific classification
- Kingdom: Animalia
- Phylum: Arthropoda
- Class: Insecta
- Order: Lepidoptera
- Family: Sphingidae
- Genus: Basiothia
- Species: B. schenki

Binomial name
- Basiothia schenki (Moschler, 1872)

Synonyms
- Chaerocampa schenki Möschler, 1872; Chaerocampa protocharis Möschler, 1872

= Basiothia schenki =

Brown striped hawk

Species of moth

Basiothia schenki, the brown striped hawk, is a moth of the family Sphingidae. The species was first described by Heinrich Benno Möschler in 1872. It is known from Zimbabwe and South Africa. Adults are also pollinators of Satyrium longicauda and Zaluzianskya natalensis.

The larvae feed on Vernonia species.
