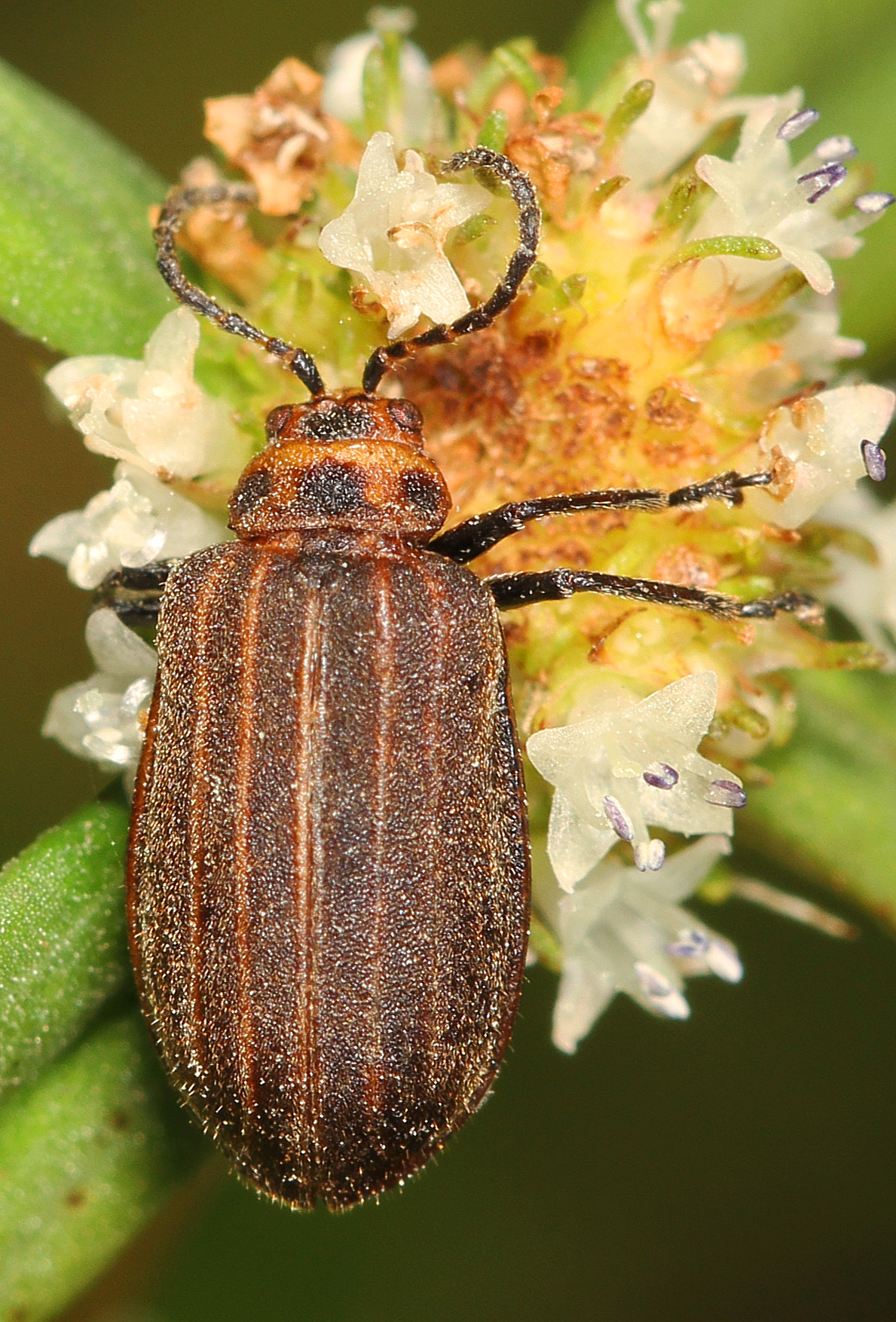
- Neolochmaea dilatipennis

Scientific classification
- Kingdom: Animalia
- Phylum: Arthropoda
- Clade: Pancrustacea
- Class: Insecta
- Order: Coleoptera
- Suborder: Polyphaga
- Infraorder: Cucujiformia
- Family: Chrysomelidae
- Tribe: Galerucini
- Genus: Neolochmaea; Laboissière, 1939

= Neolochmaea =

Genus of beetles

Neolochmaea is a genus of skeletonizing leaf beetles in the family Chrysomelidae. There are three described species in Neolochmaea. They are found in the Neotropics.

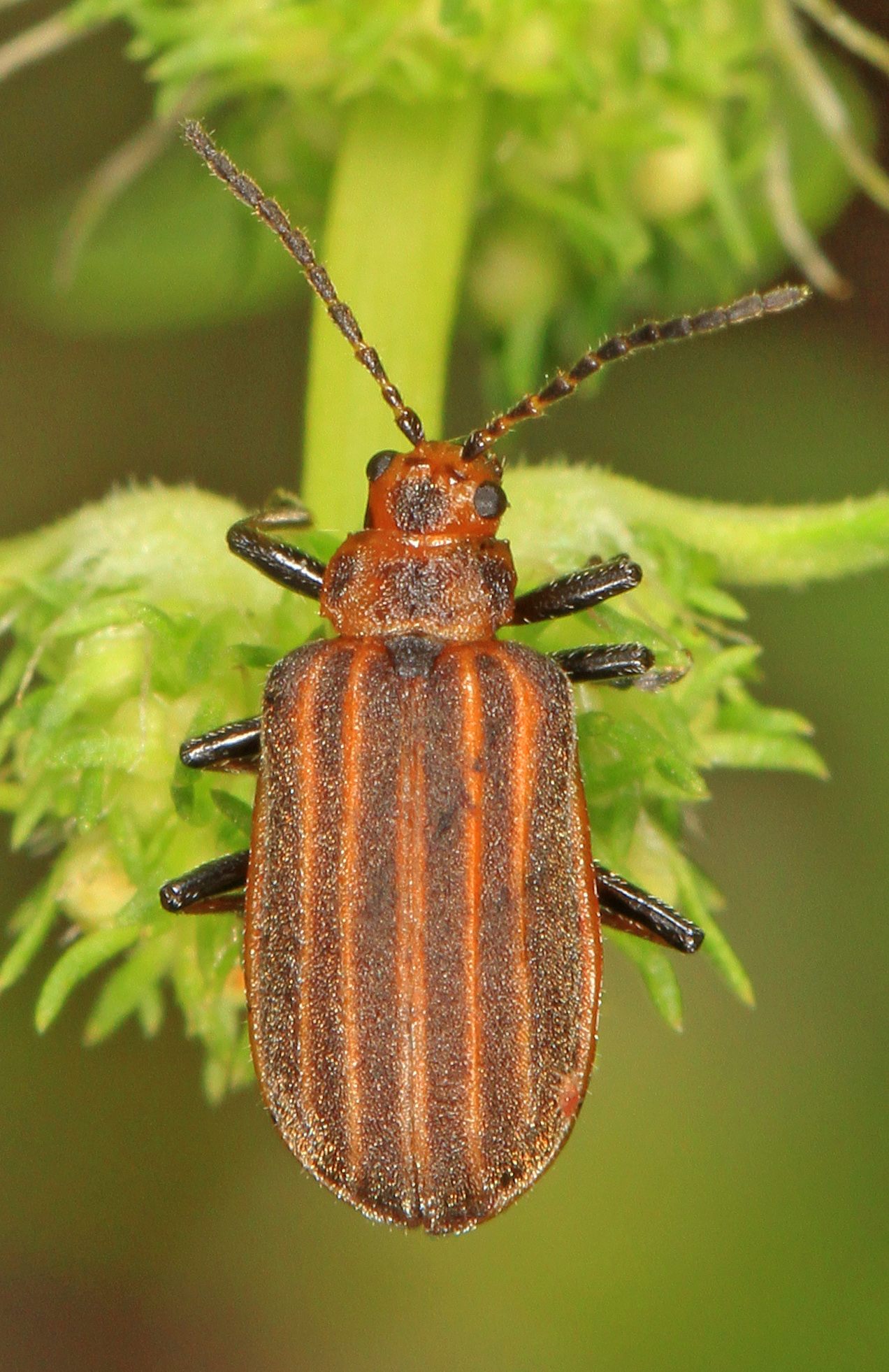
Neolochmaea dilatipennis

== Species ==
The following species are described in the genus:

- Neolochmaea brevicornis (Weise, 1921)
- Neolochmaea guerini Bechyné, 1955
- Neolochmaea obliterata (Olivier, 1808)
