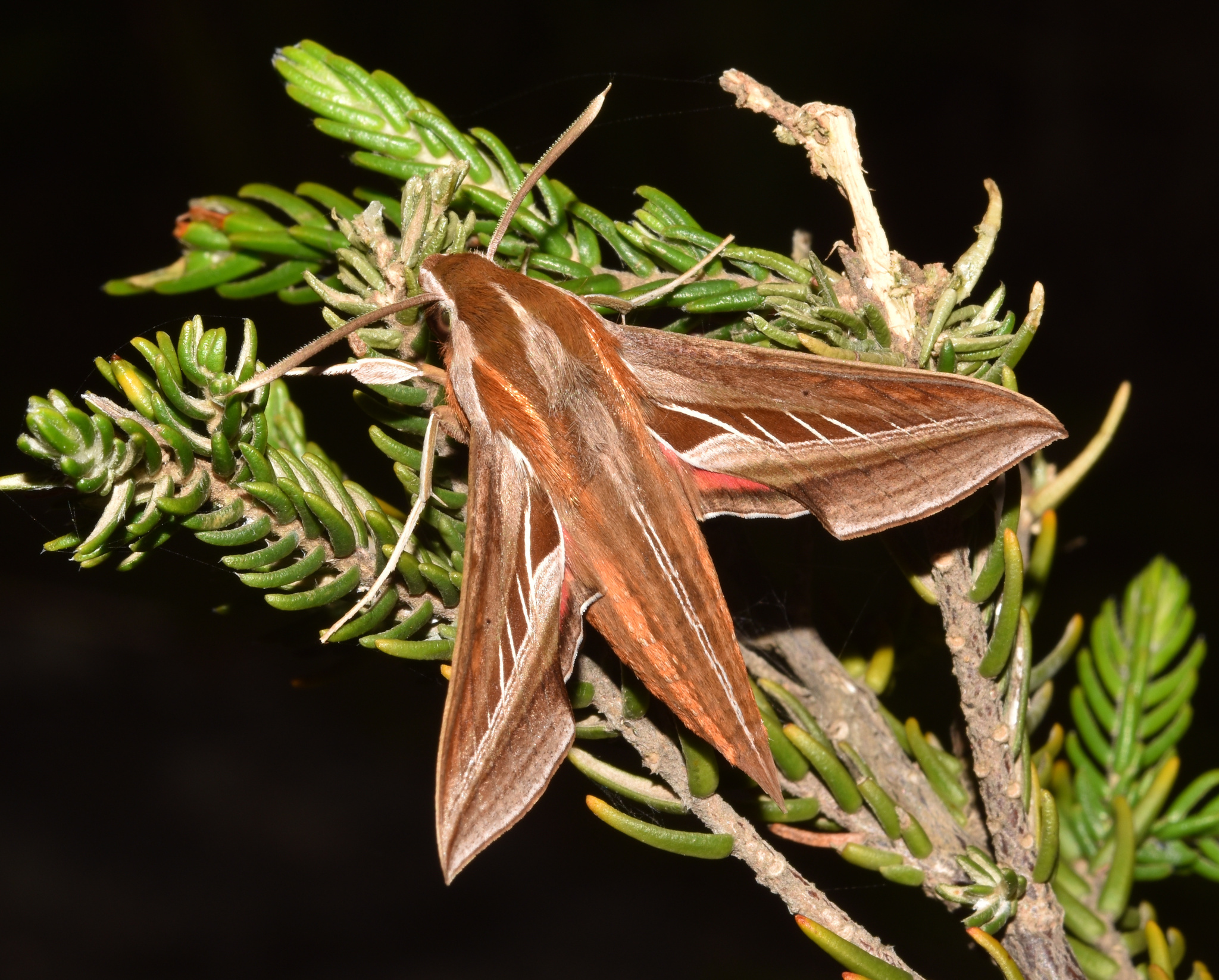

Scientific classification
- Kingdom: Animalia
- Phylum: Arthropoda
- Class: Insecta
- Order: Lepidoptera
- Family: Sphingidae
- Genus: Basiothia
- Species: B. charis

Binomial name
- Basiothia charis (Walker, 1856)

Synonyms
- Choerocampa charis Boisduval, 1847; Choerocampa celerina Boisduval

= Basiothia charis =

Lesser brown striped hawk

Species of moth

Basiothia charis, the lesser brown striped hawk, is a moth of the family Sphingidae. The species was first described by Francis Walker in 1856. It is fairly common in most habitats, excluding very dry areas, throughout Africa south of the Sahara. It has not been recorded from Madagascar.

The length of the forewings is 22–25 mm.

The larvae possibly feed on Vernonia species.
