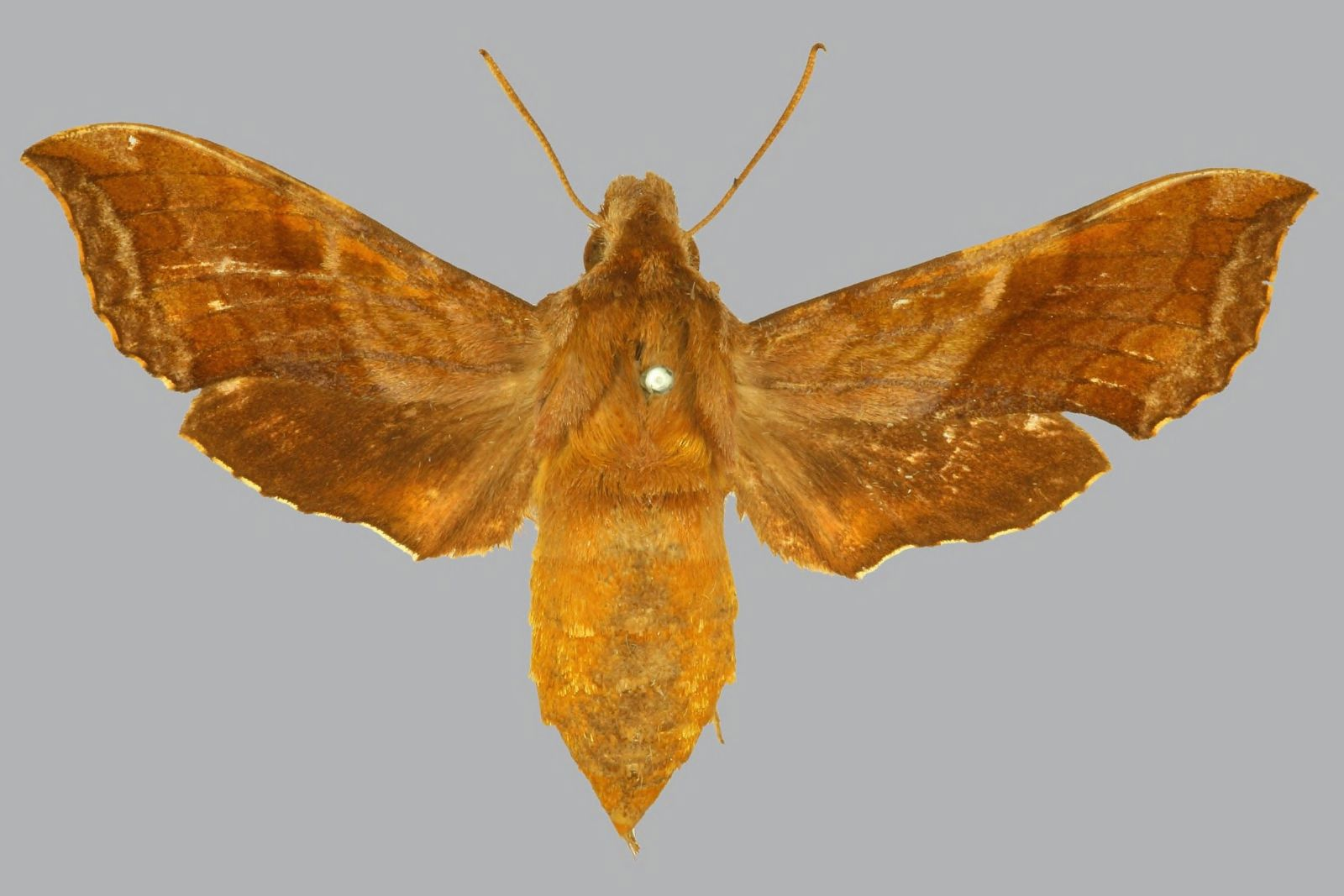
- Female

Scientific classification
- Kingdom: Animalia
- Phylum: Arthropoda
- Class: Insecta
- Order: Lepidoptera
- Family: Sphingidae
- Genus: Basiothia
- Species: B. aureata

Binomial name
- Basiothia aureata (Karsch, 1891)

Synonyms
- Ocyton aureata Karsch, 1891; Temnora aureata; Lophuron brevipenne Rothschild, 1894; Temnora brevipenne

= Basiothia aureata =

Gold dotted temnora

Species of moth

Basiothia aureata, the gold dotted temnora, is a moth of the family Sphingidae. It is found in wooded habitats from Liberia to Kenya in the east and to Angola, Zambia and Zimbabwe in the south.

The length of the forewings is 20–23 mm.
