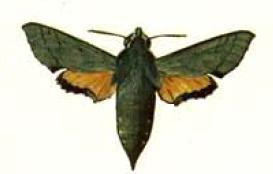

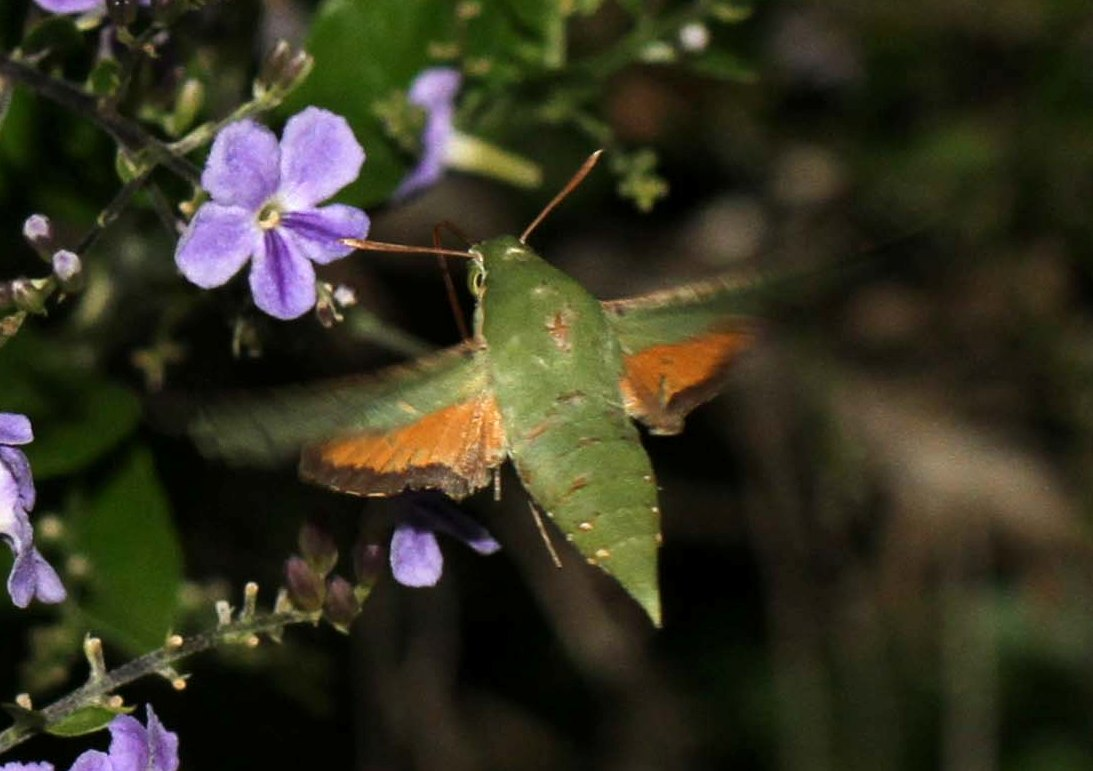

Scientific classification
- Kingdom: Animalia
- Phylum: Arthropoda
- Class: Insecta
- Order: Lepidoptera
- Family: Sphingidae
- Genus: Basiothia
- Species: B. medea

Binomial name
- Basiothia medea (Fabricius, 1781)

Synonyms
- Sphinx medea Fabricius, 1781; Sphinx minus Fabricius, 1787; Sphinx idrieus Drury, 1782; Sphinx clio Fabricius, 1793; Sphinx onothberina Martyn, 1797; Choerocampa transfigurata Wallengren, 1860; Basiothia nigrita Clark, 1920; Basiothia idricus Walker, 1856

= Basiothia medea =

Small verdant hawk

Species of moth

Basiothia medea, the small verdant hawk, is a moth of the family Sphingidae. It is common in open habitats throughout the Ethiopian Region, including Madagascar. It is however probably absent from the equatorial forest belt, except as a vagrant. The species is an active migrant.

The length of the forewings is 22–25 mm and the wingspan is 49–63 mm.

The larvae feed on Spermacoce natalensis, Dioda, Spermacoce, Pentas and Pentasinia species.
