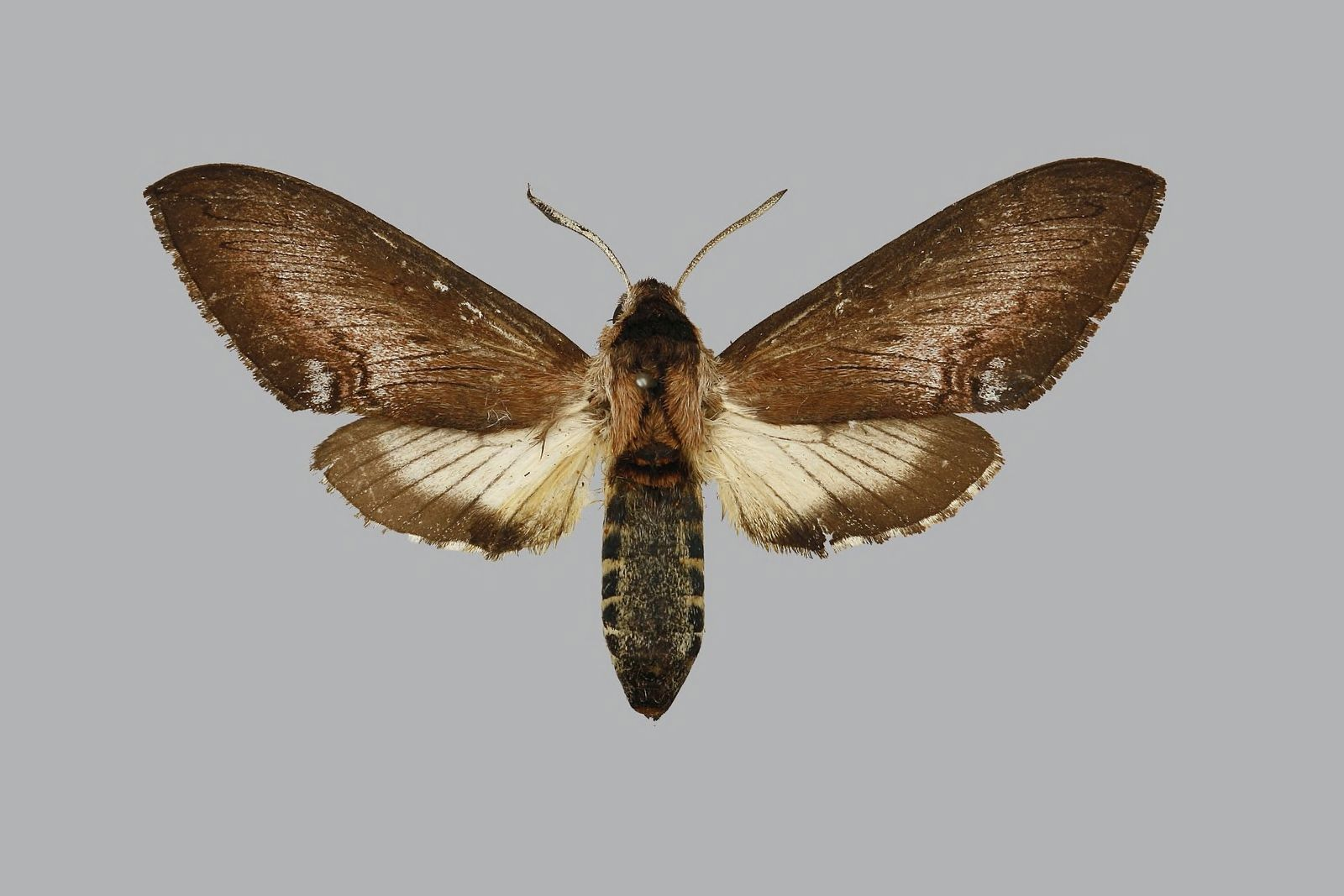

Scientific classification
- Domain: Eukaryota
- Kingdom: Animalia
- Phylum: Arthropoda
- Class: Insecta
- Order: Lepidoptera
- Family: Sphingidae
- Genus: Neogene
- Species: N. pictus

Binomial name
- Neogene pictus Clark, 1931

Synonyms
- Neogene picta

= Neogene pictus =

Species of moth

Neogene pictus is a moth of the family Sphingidae. It is known from Paraguay and northern Argentina. This species was synonymized with Neogene reevei in 2022.
