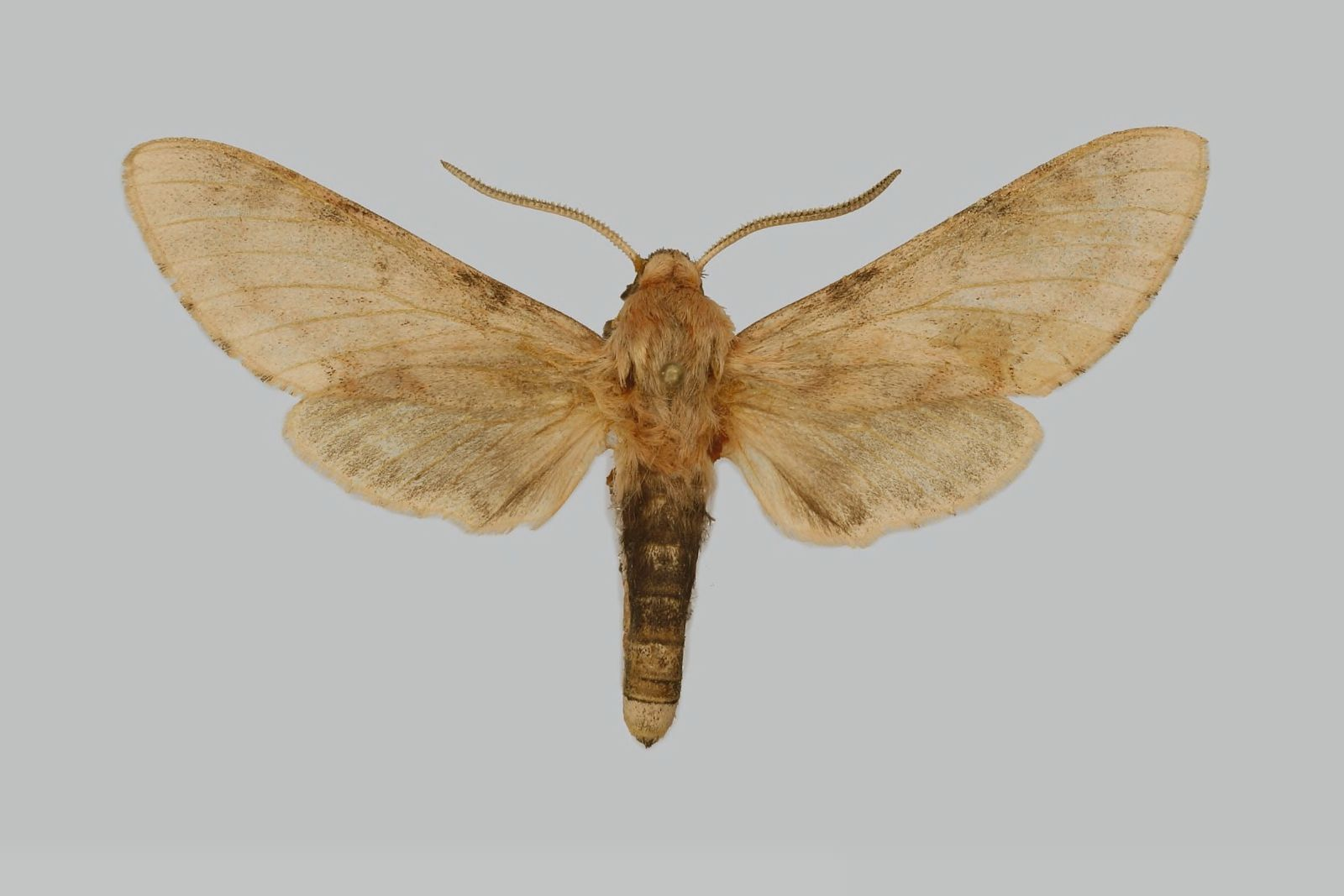

Scientific classification
- Domain: Eukaryota
- Kingdom: Animalia
- Phylum: Arthropoda
- Class: Insecta
- Order: Lepidoptera
- Family: Sphingidae
- Genus: Neogene
- Species: N. carrerasi

Binomial name
- Neogene carrerasi (Giacomelli, 1911)

Synonyms
- Protoparce carrerasi Giacomelli, 1911

= Neogene carrerasi =

Species of moth

Neogene carrerasi is a moth of the family Sphingidae. It is known from Argentina.
