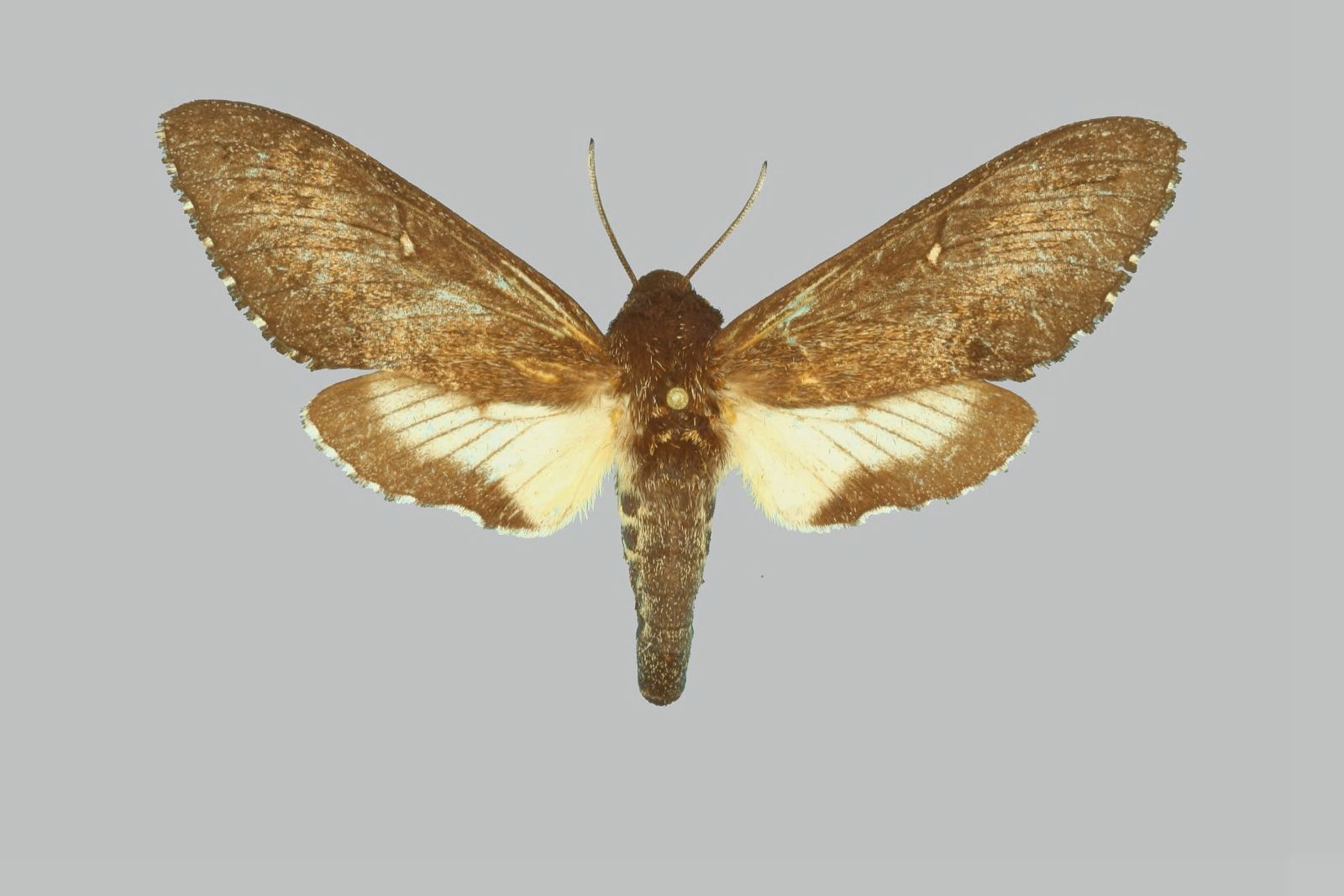
- Neogene curitiba upper-side view

Scientific classification
- Domain: Eukaryota
- Kingdom: Animalia
- Phylum: Arthropoda
- Class: Insecta
- Order: Lepidoptera
- Family: Sphingidae
- Genus: Neogene
- Species: N. curitiba

Binomial name
- Neogene curitiba E. D. Jones, 1908

= Neogene curitiba =

Species of moth

Neogene curitiba is a moth of the family Sphingidae first described by E. Dukinfield Jones in 1908. It is known from Brazil.

The wingspan is 52–63 mm. Adults have been recorded in October.
