= Neogene corumbensis =

Scientific classification
- Domain: Eukaryota
- Kingdom: Animalia
- Phylum: Arthropoda
- Class: Insecta
- Order: Lepidoptera
- Family: Sphingidae
- Genus: Neogene
- Species: N. corumbensis

Binomial name
- Neogene corumbensis Clark, 1922

Species of moth

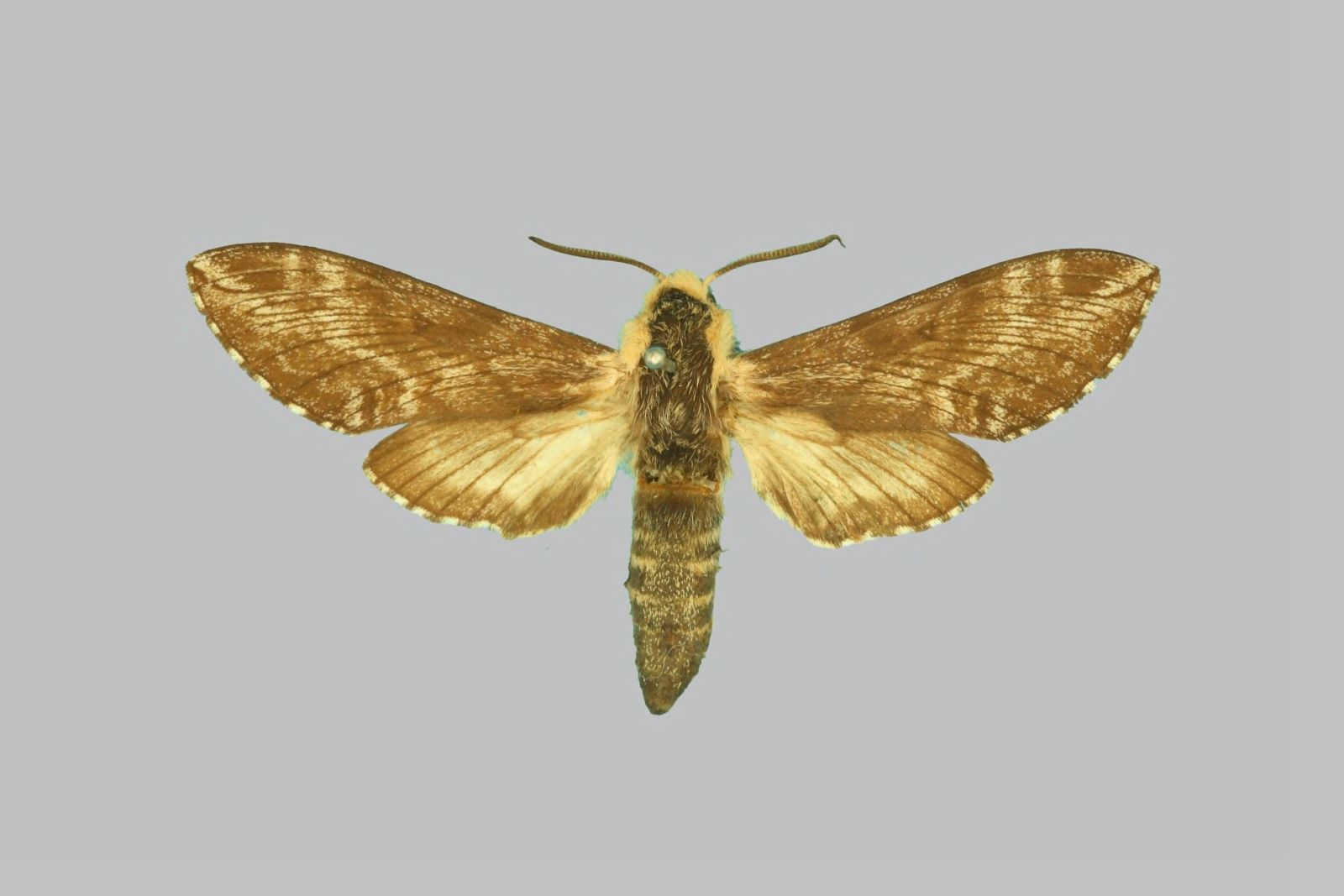
Male Neogene corumbensis

Neogene corumbensis is a moth of the family Sphingidae. It is found in Argentina and Bolivia.

The forewings are 23 mm long in males and 25 mm in females. It is mainly brown.
