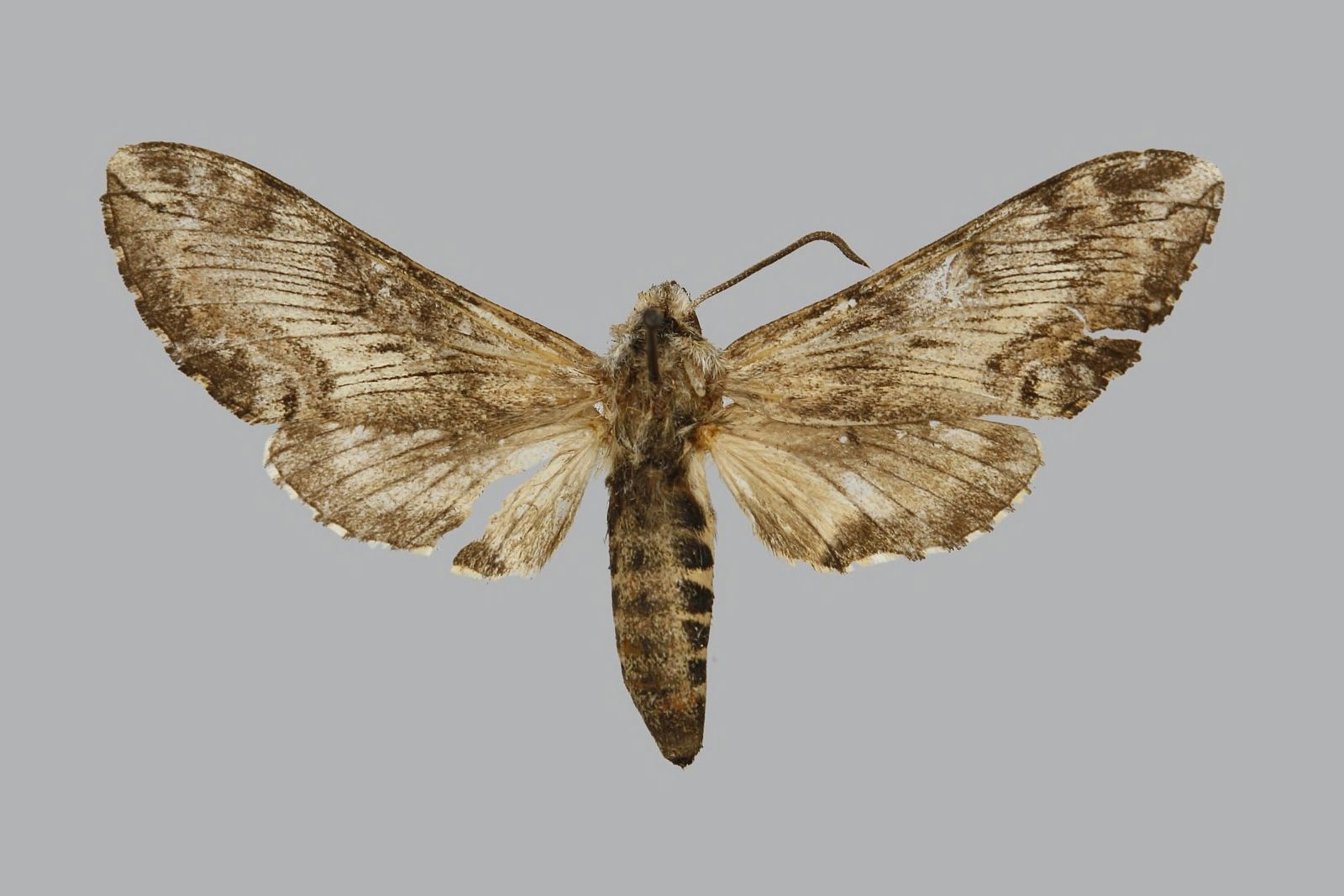

Scientific classification
- Domain: Eukaryota
- Kingdom: Animalia
- Phylum: Arthropoda
- Class: Insecta
- Order: Lepidoptera
- Family: Sphingidae
- Genus: Neogene
- Species: N. albescens

Binomial name
- Neogene albescens Clark, 1929

= Neogene albescens =

Species of moth

Neogene albescens is a moth of the family Sphingidae. It is known from Argentina.
