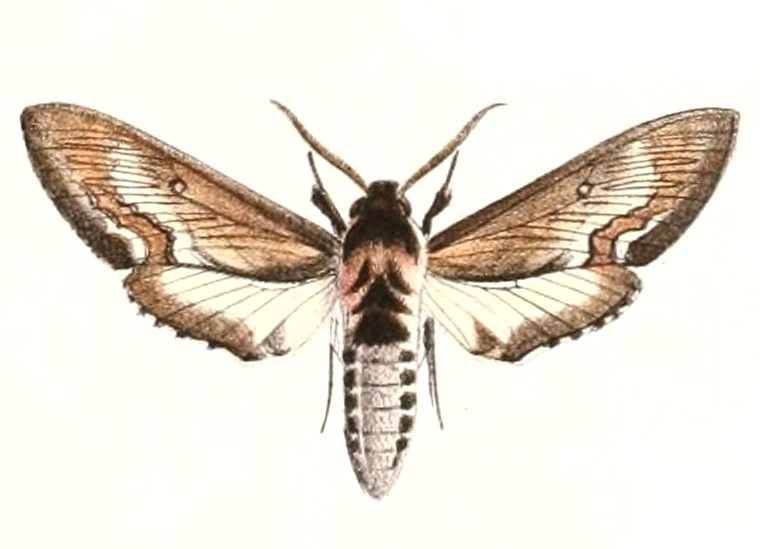
- Neogene reevei

Scientific classification
- Domain: Eukaryota
- Kingdom: Animalia
- Phylum: Arthropoda
- Class: Insecta
- Order: Lepidoptera
- Family: Sphingidae
- Tribe: Sphingini
- Genus: Neogene; Rothschild & Jordan, 1903

= Neogene (moth) =

Genus of moths

Neogene is a genus of moths in the family Sphingidae erected by Walter Rothschild and Karl Jordan in 1903. They are of neotropical distribution.

== Species ==
- Neogene albescens Clark, 1929
- Neogene carrerasi (Giacomelli, 1911)
- Neogene corumbensis Clark, 1922
- Neogene curitiba E. D. Jones, 1908
- Neogene dynaeus (Hübner, 1927)
- Neogene intermedia Clark, 1935
- Neogene pictus Clark, 1931
- Neogene reevei (Druce, 1882)
- Neogene steinbachi Clark, 1924
