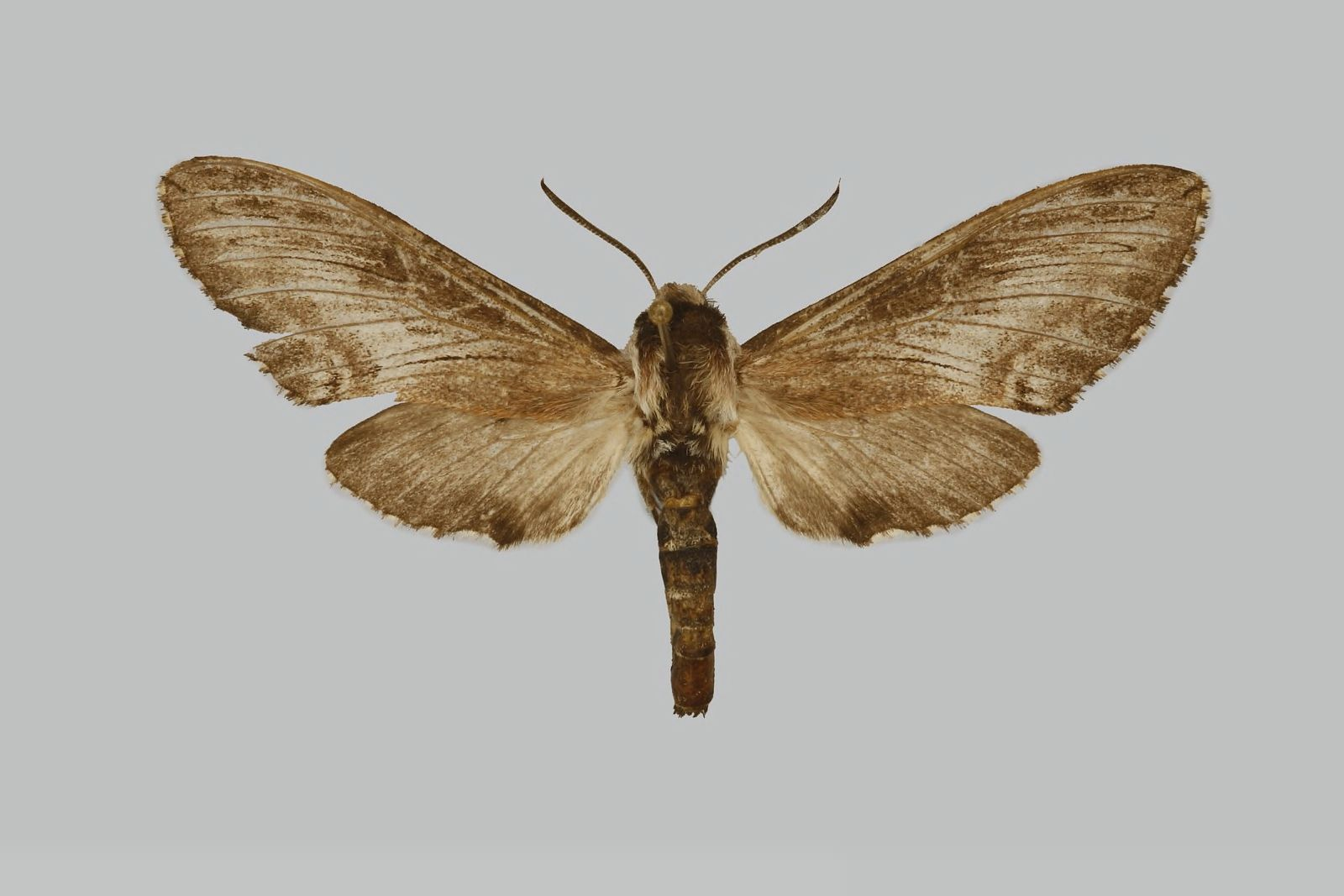

Scientific classification
- Domain: Eukaryota
- Kingdom: Animalia
- Phylum: Arthropoda
- Class: Insecta
- Order: Lepidoptera
- Family: Sphingidae
- Genus: Neogene
- Species: N. steinbachi

Binomial name
- Neogene steinbachi Clark, 1924

= Neogene steinbachi =

Species of moth

Neogene steinbachi is a moth of the family Sphingidae. It is known from Bolivia.

Adults have been recorded in August.
