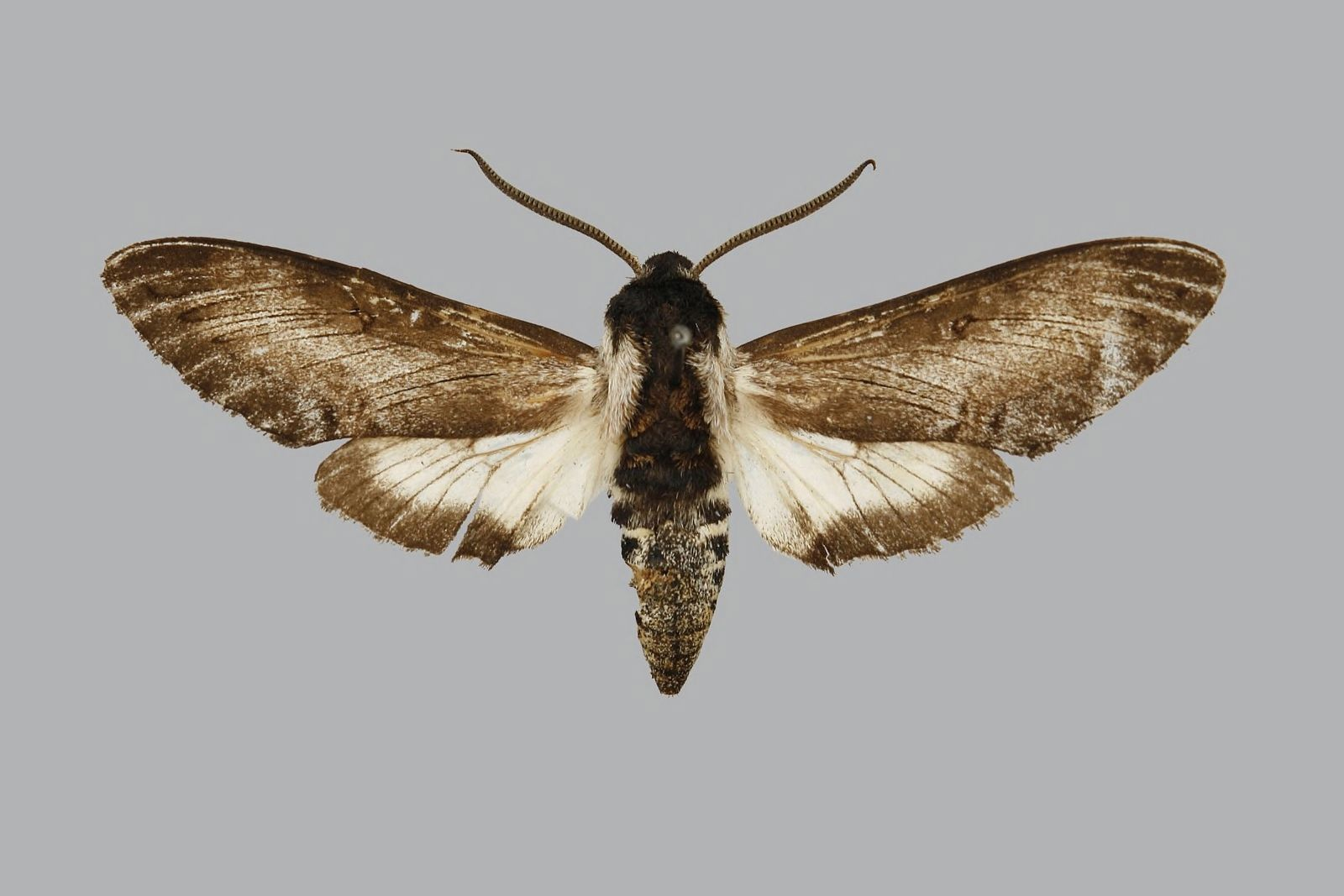

Scientific classification
- Domain: Eukaryota
- Kingdom: Animalia
- Phylum: Arthropoda
- Class: Insecta
- Order: Lepidoptera
- Family: Sphingidae
- Genus: Neogene
- Species: N. intermedia

Binomial name
- Neogene intermedia Clark, 1935

= Neogene intermedia =

Species of moth

Neogene intermedia is a moth of the family Sphingidae. It is known from Paraguay.

The length of the forewings is about 28 mm.
