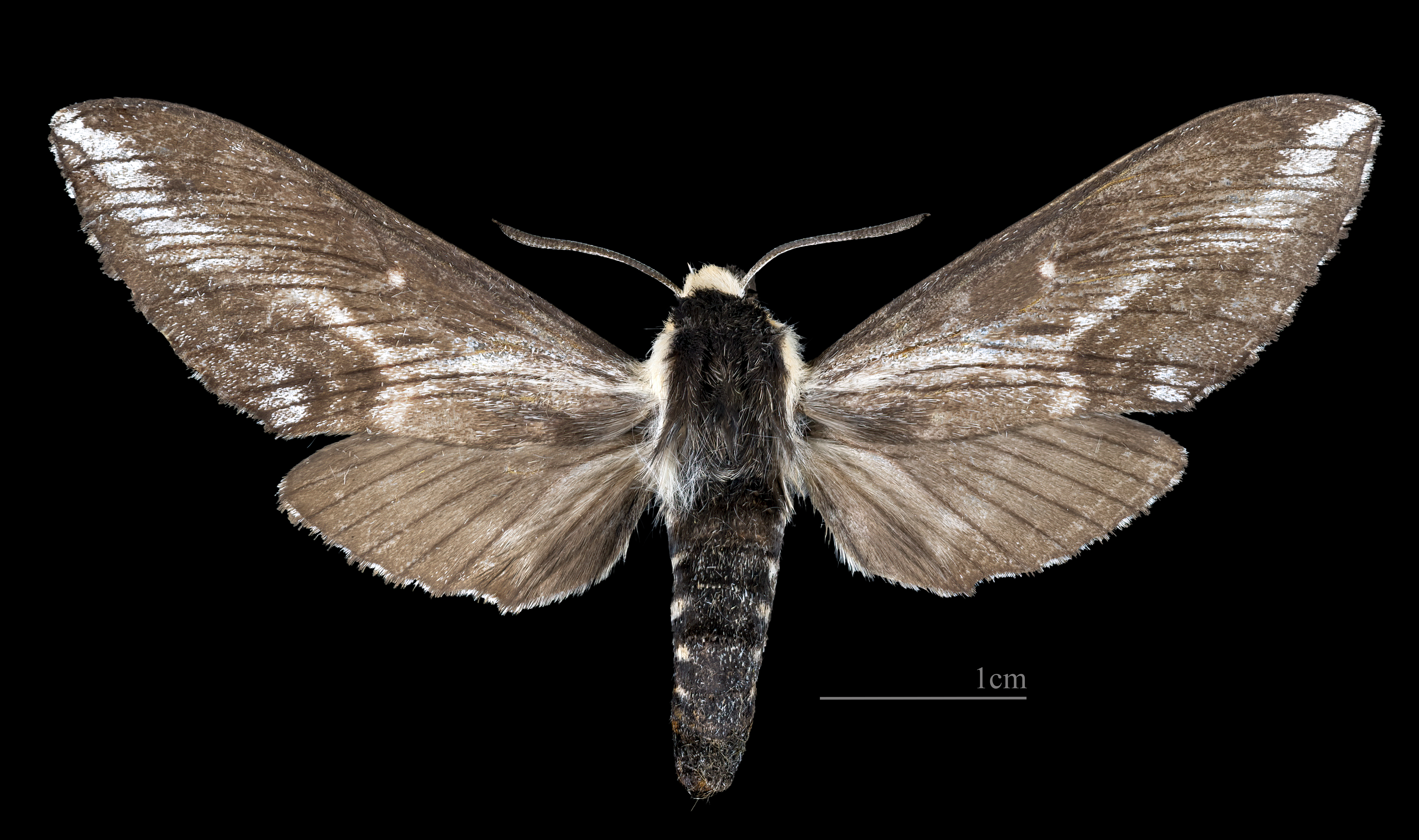
- Neogene dynaeus ♂
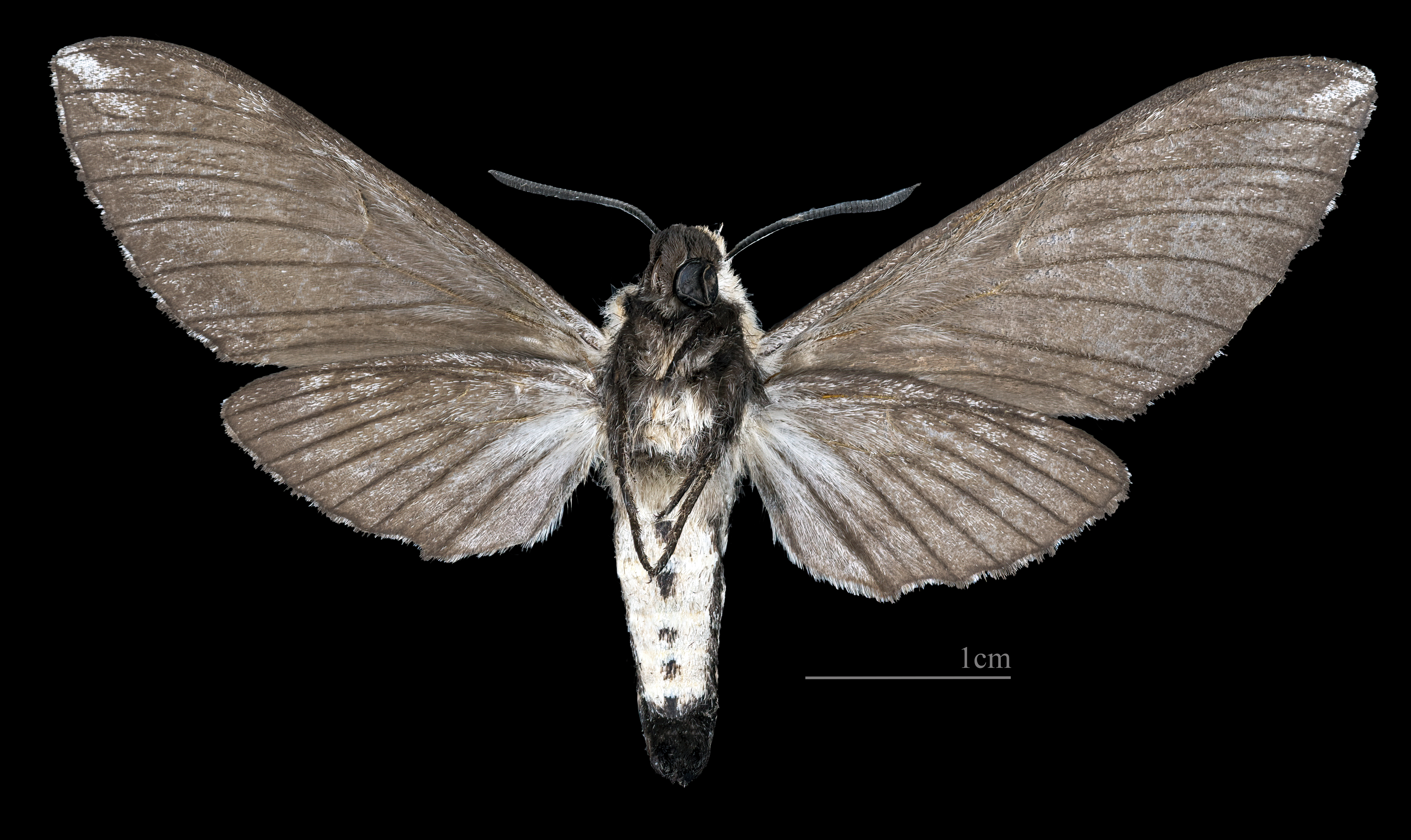
- Neogene dynaeus ♂ △

Scientific classification
- Domain: Eukaryota
- Kingdom: Animalia
- Phylum: Arthropoda
- Class: Insecta
- Order: Lepidoptera
- Family: Sphingidae
- Genus: Neogene
- Species: N. dynaeus

Binomial name
- Neogene dynaeus (Hubner, 1927)

Synonyms
- Hyloicus dynaeus Hübner, 1831

= Neogene dynaeus =

Species of moth

Neogene dynaeus is a moth of the family Sphingidae. It is known from Brazil.

It is similar to Neogene reevi. There is an oblique, more or less interrupted, grey apical band on the forewing upperside that usually joins the grey, transverse discal band. The hindwing upperside is more or less suffused with brown and the brown marginal band is not sharply defined.
