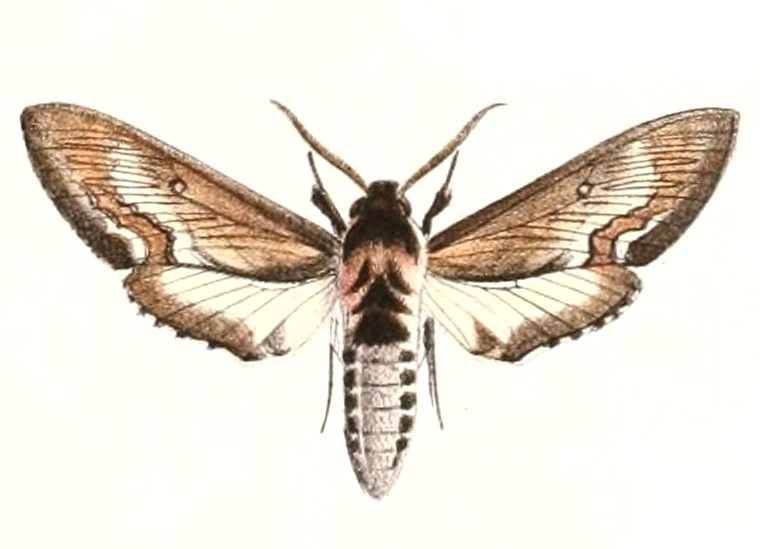

Scientific classification
- Domain: Eukaryota
- Kingdom: Animalia
- Phylum: Arthropoda
- Class: Insecta
- Order: Lepidoptera
- Family: Sphingidae
- Genus: Neogene
- Species: N. reevei

Binomial name
- Neogene reevei (H. Druce, 1882)

Synonyms
- Hyloicus reevei H. Druce, 1882; Sphinx baruta Berg, 1883; Sphinx cossoides Rothschild, 1894; Neogene reevei minor Clark, 1938

= Neogene reevei =

Species of moth

Neogene reevei is a moth of the family Sphingidae first described by Herbert Druce in 1882. It is known from Paraguay, Argentina and Brazil.

It is similar to Neogene dynaeus. The hindwing upperside disc is more shaded with brown in the female than in the male, where the colour is mainly restricted to the veins. The width of the black border is individually variable.

Adults have been recorded in March in Santiago del Estero, January in Cordoba and February in Tucuman.
