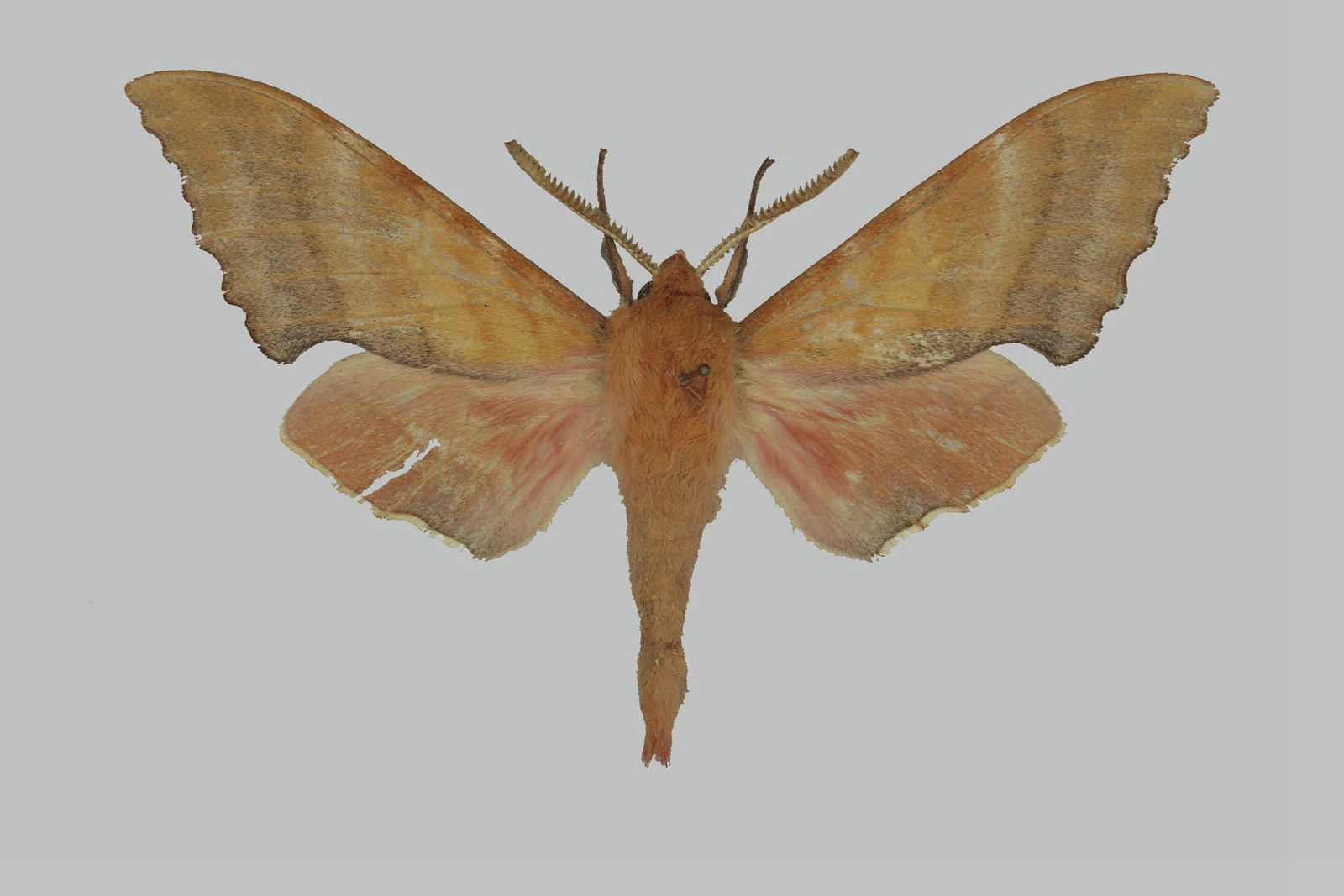

Scientific classification
- Kingdom: Animalia
- Phylum: Arthropoda
- Class: Insecta
- Order: Lepidoptera
- Family: Sphingidae
- Genus: Rhodoprasina
- Species: R. nanlingensis

Binomial name
- Rhodoprasina nanlingensis Kishida & Wang, 2003

= Rhodoprasina nanlingensis =

Species of moth

Rhodoprasina nanlingensis is a species of moth of the family Sphingidae. It is known from Hunan and Guangdong in China.
