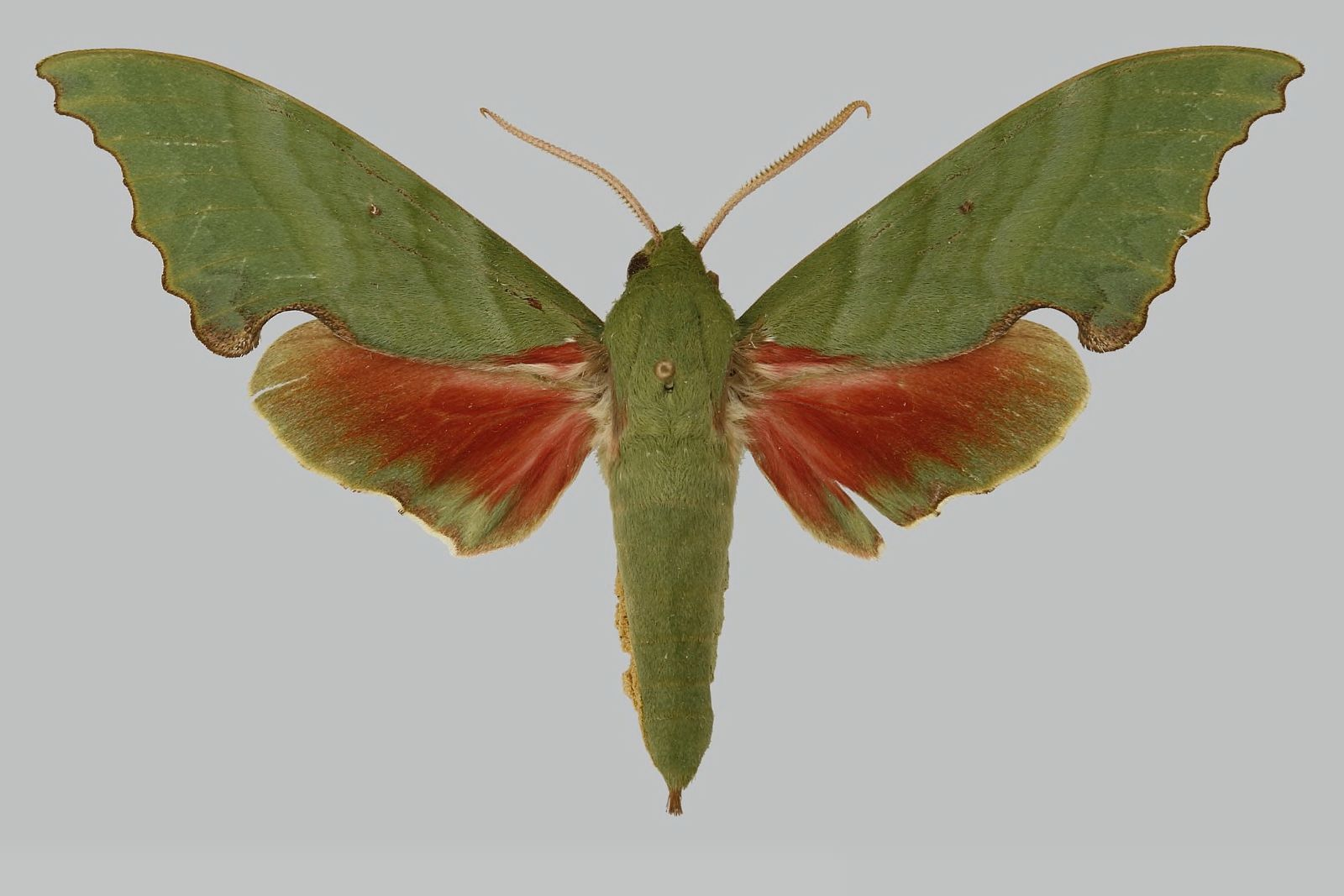
- Rhodoprasina floralis

Scientific classification
- Domain: Eukaryota
- Kingdom: Animalia
- Phylum: Arthropoda
- Class: Insecta
- Order: Lepidoptera
- Family: Sphingidae
- Tribe: Smerinthini
- Genus: Rhodoprasina; Rothschild & Jordan, 1903

Species
- See text

= Rhodoprasina =

Genus of moths

Rhodoprasina is a genus of moths in the family Sphingidae erected by Walter Rothschild and Karl Jordan in 1903.

== Species ==
- Rhodoprasina callantha Jordan 1929
- Rhodoprasina corolla Cadiou & Kitching 1990
- Rhodoprasina corrigenda Kitching & Cadiou 1996
- Rhodoprasina floralis (Butler 1876)
- Rhodoprasina koerferi Brechlin, 2010
- Rhodoprasina mateji Brechlin & Melichar, 2006
- Rhodoprasina nanlingensis Kishida & Wang, 2003
- Rhodoprasina nenulfascia Zhu & Wang 1997
- Rhodoprasina viksinjaevi Brechlin, 2004
- Rhodoprasina winbrechlini Brechlin 1996
