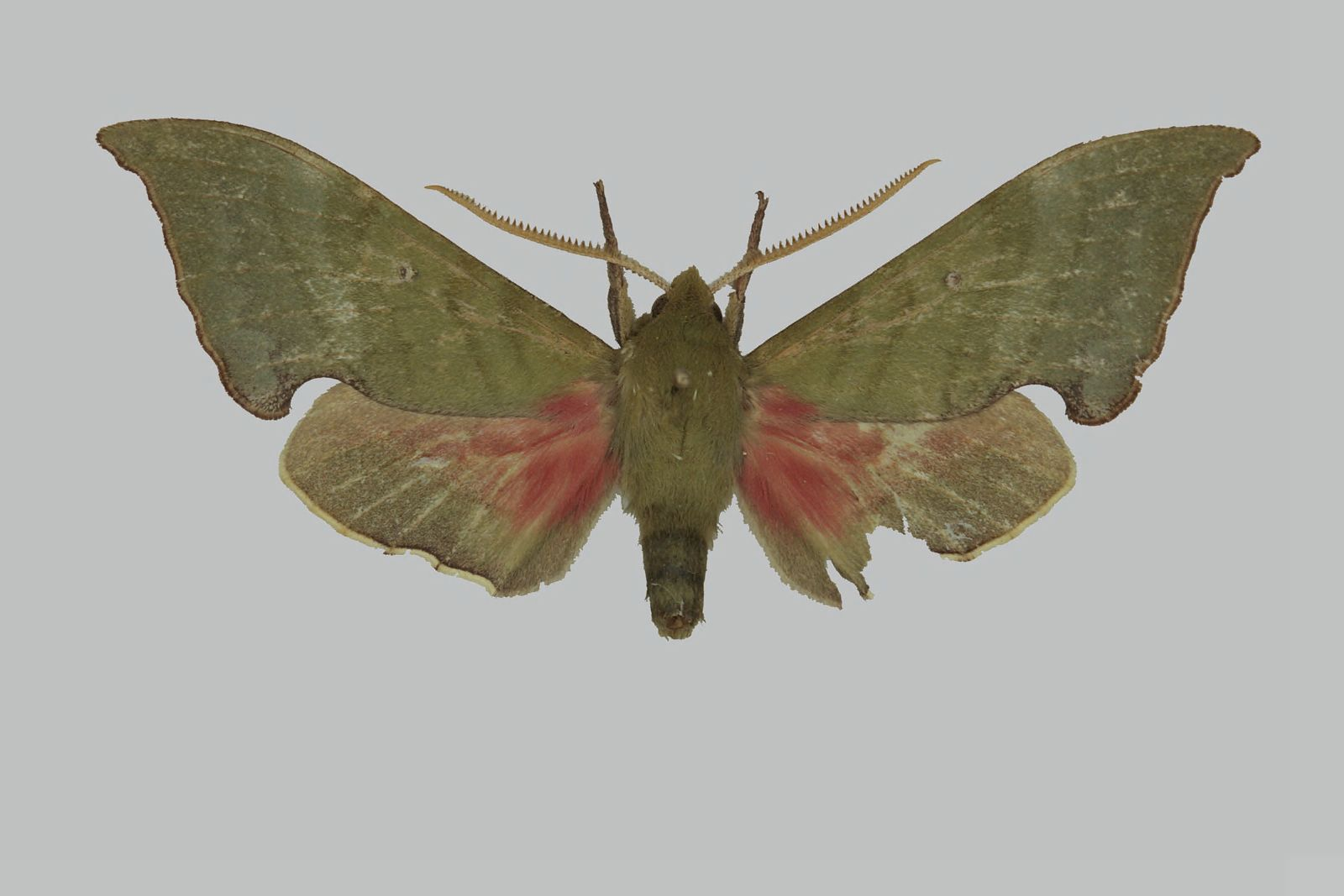

Scientific classification
- Kingdom: Animalia
- Phylum: Arthropoda
- Class: Insecta
- Order: Lepidoptera
- Family: Sphingidae
- Genus: Rhodoprasina
- Species: R. winbrechlini

Binomial name
- Rhodoprasina winbrechlini Brechlin, 1996

= Rhodoprasina winbrechlini =

Species of moth

Rhodoprasina winbrechlini is a species of moth of the family Sphingidae. It is known from northern Vietnam and southern Yunnan in China.

Adults are on wing in early March in northern Vietnam and early April in Yunnan.
