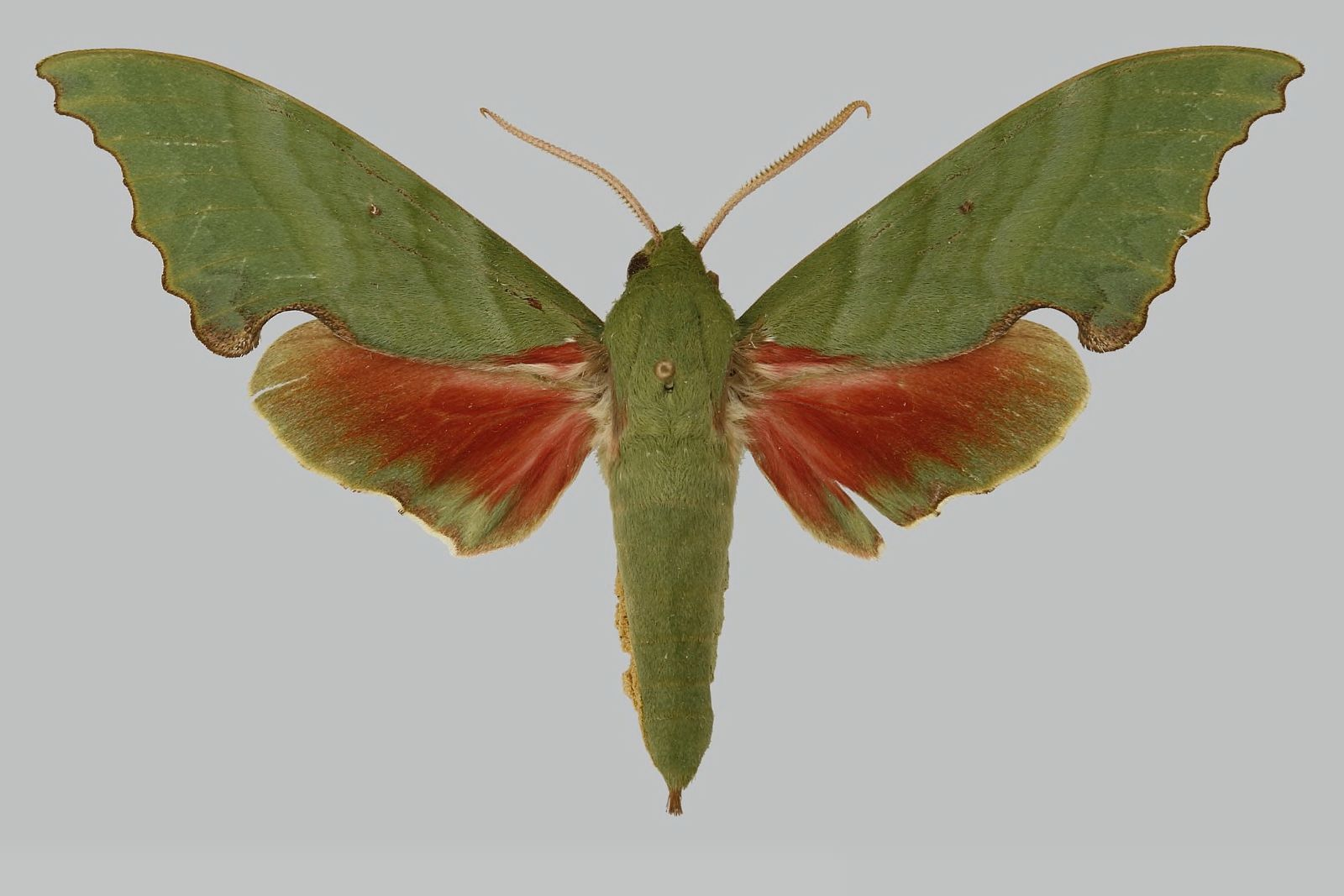

Scientific classification
- Kingdom: Animalia
- Phylum: Arthropoda
- Class: Insecta
- Order: Lepidoptera
- Family: Sphingidae
- Genus: Rhodoprasina
- Species: R. floralis

Binomial name
- Rhodoprasina floralis (Butler, 1876)

Synonyms
- Ambulyx floralis Butler, 1876

= Rhodoprasina floralis =

Species of moth

Rhodoprasina floralis is a species of moth of the family Sphingidae. It is known from northern India and Nepal.

The larvae have been recorded feeding on Acer campbelli.
