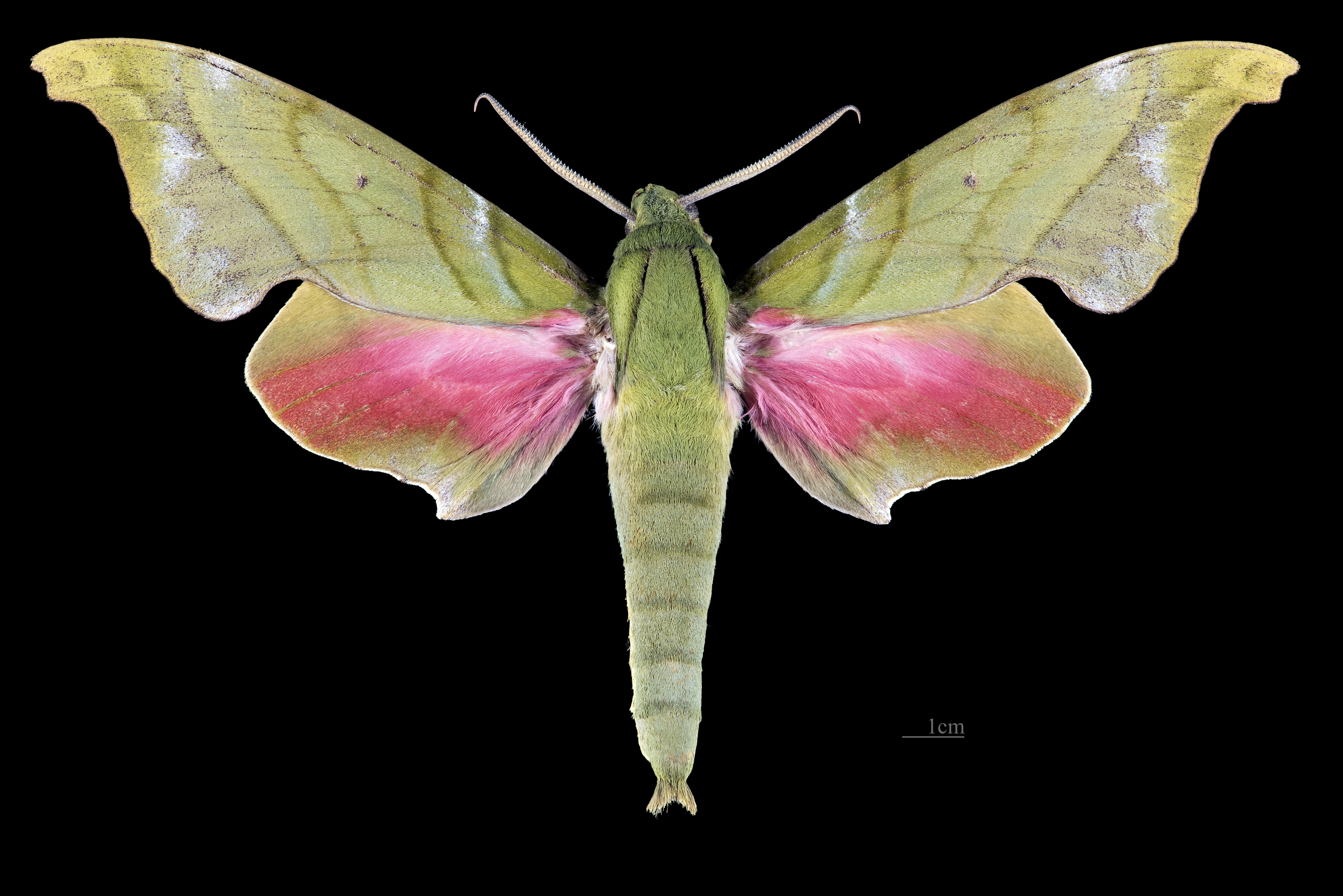
- Rhodoprasina callantha male dorsal
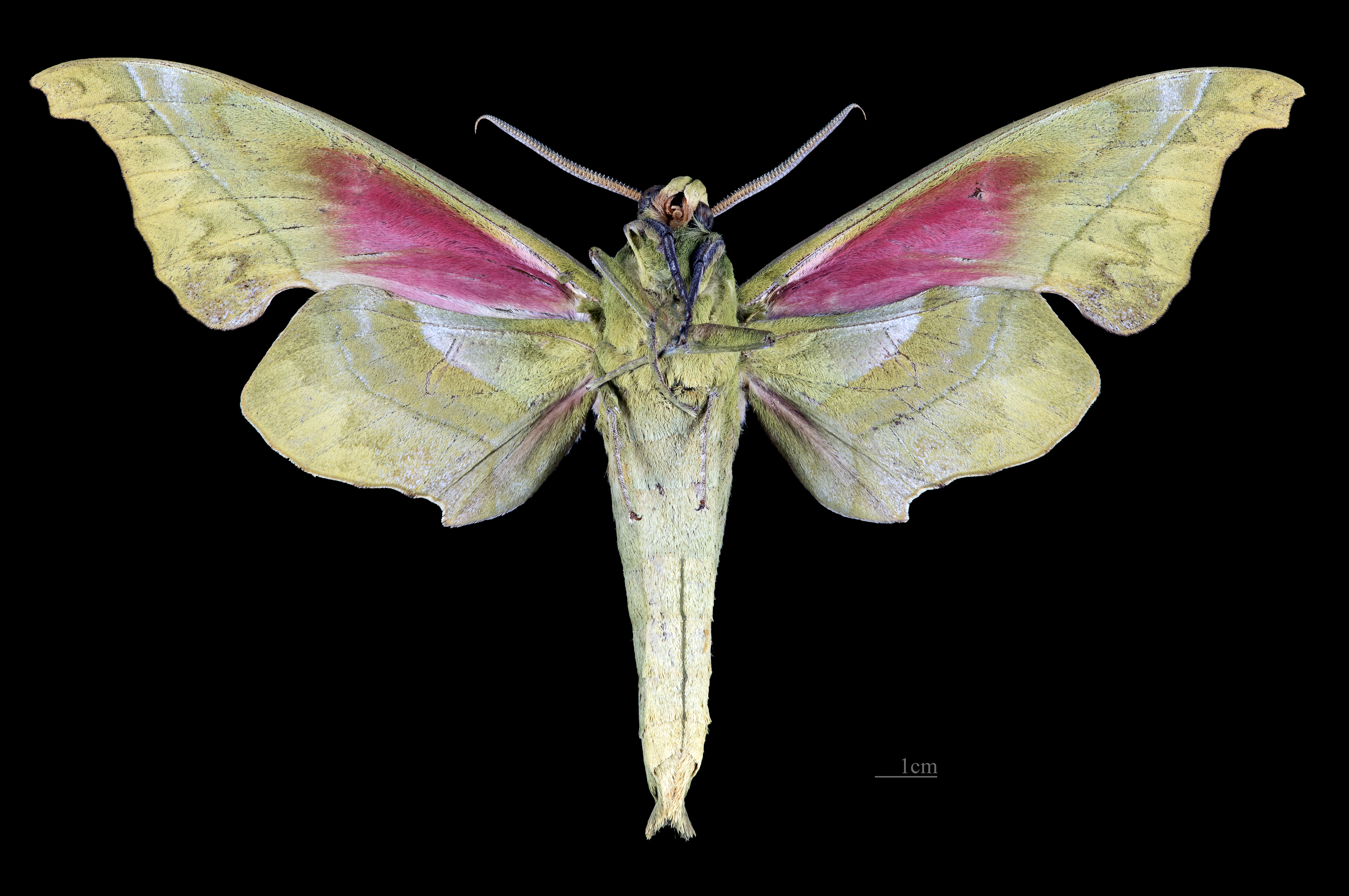
- Rhodoprasina callantha male ventral

Scientific classification
- Kingdom: Animalia
- Phylum: Arthropoda
- Class: Insecta
- Order: Lepidoptera
- Family: Sphingidae
- Genus: Rhodoprasina
- Species: R. callantha

Binomial name
- Rhodoprasina callantha Jordan, 1929

= Rhodoprasina callantha =

Species of moth

Rhodoprasina callantha, the small olive hawkmoth, is a species of moth of the family Sphingidae. It is found from north-eastern India across south-western China and northern Thailand to northern Vietnam.

The wingspan is 90–120 mm.

Adults are on wing from January to April and again from August to November in Thailand.

The larvae have been recorded feeding on Quercus species, including Quercus fenestrata in India.
