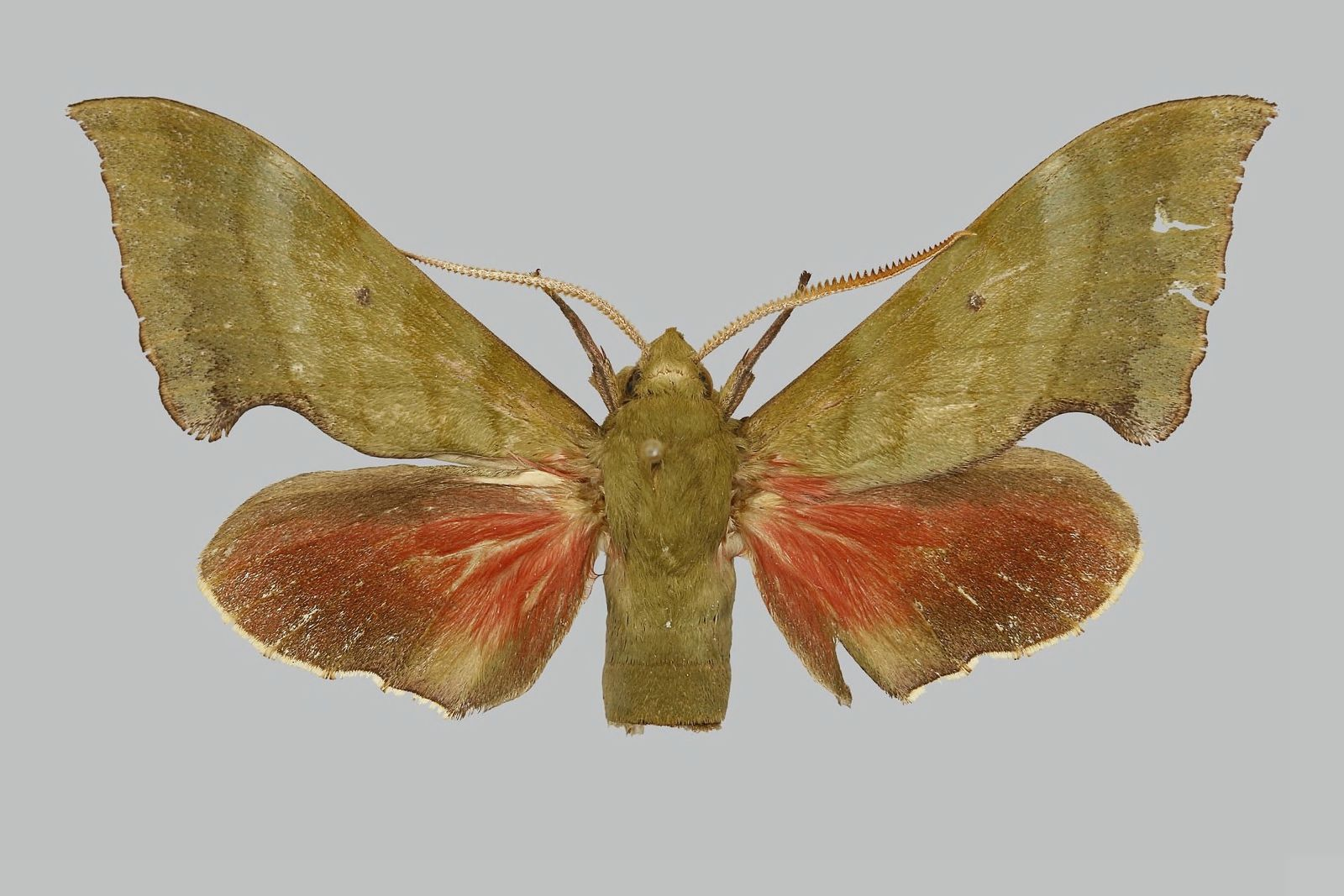

Scientific classification
- Kingdom: Animalia
- Phylum: Arthropoda
- Clade: Pancrustacea
- Class: Insecta
- Order: Lepidoptera
- Family: Sphingidae
- Genus: Rhodoprasina
- Species: R. corolla

Binomial name
- Rhodoprasina corolla Cadiou & Kitching, 1990

= Rhodoprasina corolla =

Species of moth

Rhodoprasina corolla is a species of moth of the family Sphingidae. It is known from Thailand.
