= Rhodoprasina koerferi =

Scientific classification
- Kingdom: Animalia
- Phylum: Arthropoda
- Class: Insecta
- Order: Lepidoptera
- Family: Sphingidae
- Genus: Rhodoprasina
- Species: R. koerferi

Binomial name
- Rhodoprasina koerferi Brechlin, 2010

Species of moth

Rhodoprasina koerferi is a species of moth in the family Sphingidae. It is known from Bhutan, Tibet, and Arunachal Pradesh.
