= Rhodoprasina mateji =

Scientific classification
- Kingdom: Animalia
- Phylum: Arthropoda
- Class: Insecta
- Order: Lepidoptera
- Family: Sphingidae
- Genus: Rhodoprasina
- Species: R. mateji

Binomial name
- Rhodoprasina mateji Brechlin & Melichar, 2006

Species of moth

Rhodoprasina mateji is a species of moth of the family Sphingidae. It is known from Hubei in China.

Adult males have a long antennae. The forewings are matt green and the basal third of the hindwing upperside is red.
