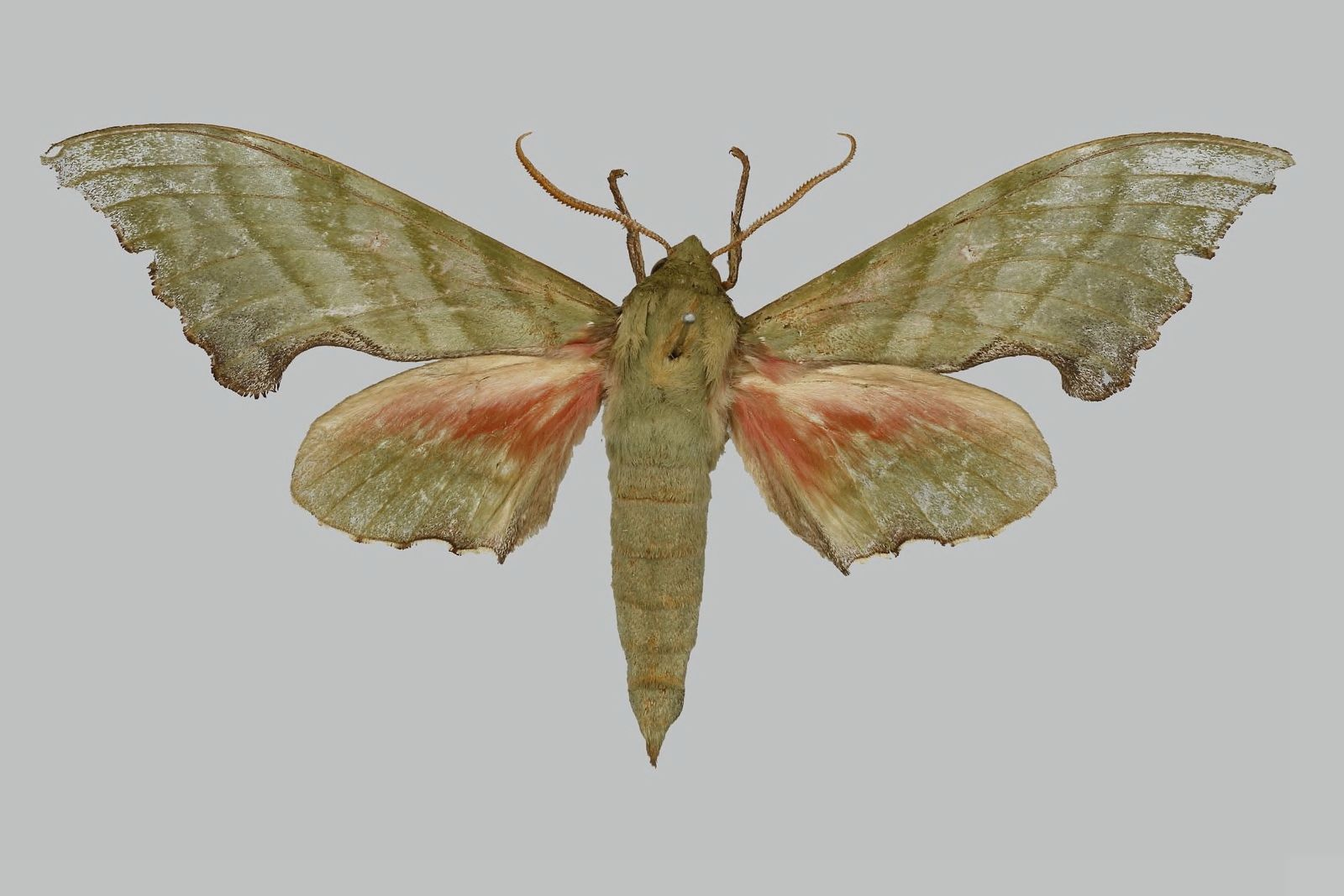

Scientific classification
- Kingdom: Animalia
- Phylum: Arthropoda
- Clade: Pancrustacea
- Class: Insecta
- Order: Lepidoptera
- Family: Sphingidae
- Genus: Rhodoprasina
- Species: R. corrigenda

Binomial name
- Rhodoprasina corrigenda Kitching & Cadiou, 1996

= Rhodoprasina corrigenda =

Species of moth

Rhodoprasina corrigenda is a species of moth of the family Sphingidae. It is known from northern Thailand and northern Vietnam.

The wingspan is 104–116 mm.

Adults are on wing from October to early December in Thailand.
