= Rhodoprasina nenulfascia =

Scientific classification
- Kingdom: Animalia
- Phylum: Arthropoda
- Class: Insecta
- Order: Lepidoptera
- Family: Sphingidae
- Genus: Rhodoprasina
- Species: R. nenulfascia

Binomial name
- Rhodoprasina nenulfascia Zhu & Wang, 1997

Species of moth

Rhodoprasina nenulfascia is a species of moth of the family Sphingidae. It is known from southern Tibet near the borders with India and Bhutan.
