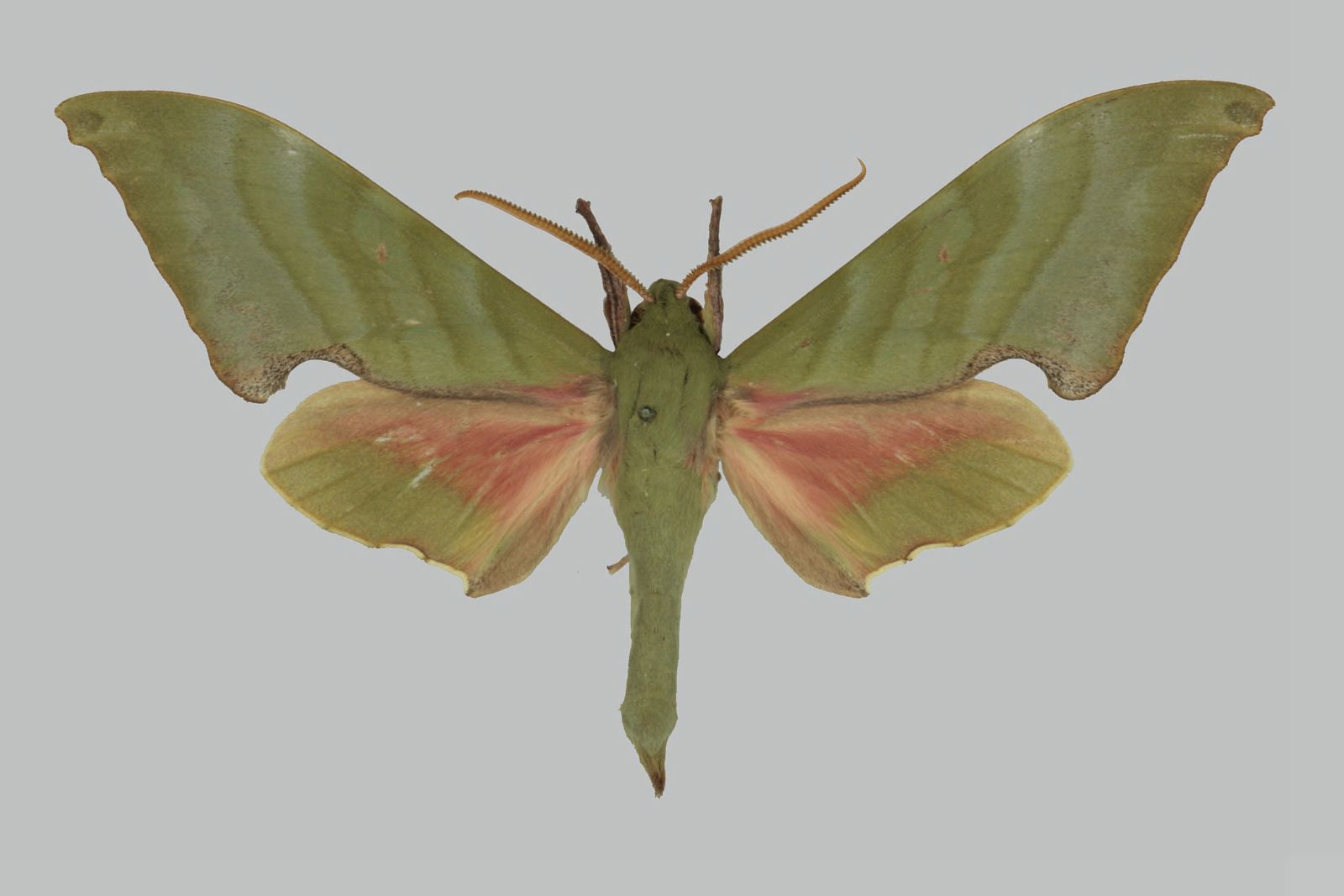

Scientific classification
- Domain: Eukaryota
- Kingdom: Animalia
- Phylum: Arthropoda
- Class: Insecta
- Order: Lepidoptera
- Family: Sphingidae
- Genus: Rhodoprasina
- Species: R. viksinjaevi

Binomial name
- Rhodoprasina viksinjaevi Brechlin, 2004

= Rhodoprasina viksinjaevi =

Species of moth

Rhodoprasina viksinjaevi is a species of moth of the family Sphingidae. It is known from Guangdong and Hunan in China.

The wingspan is 82–100 mm.
