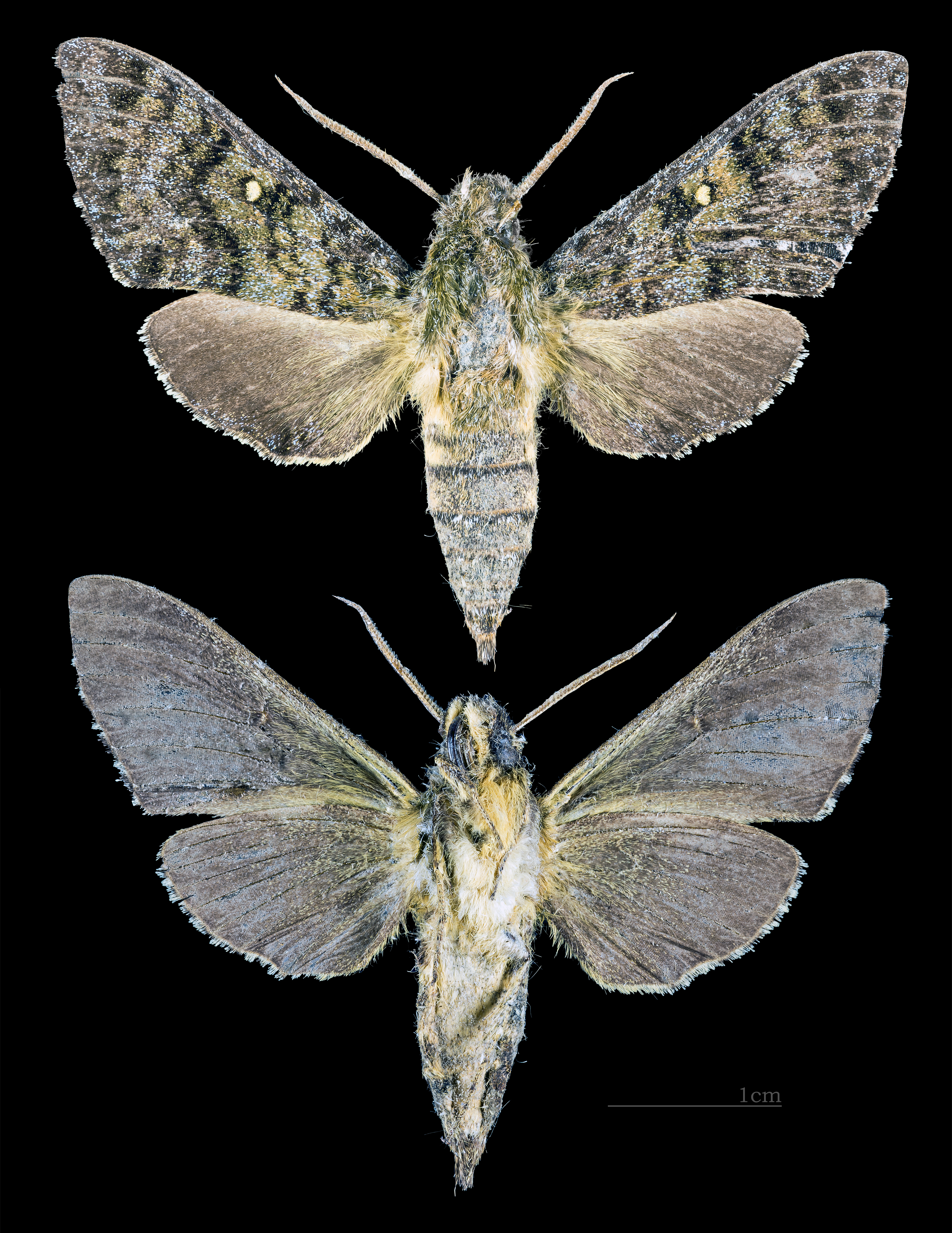
- Pseudodolbina fo

Scientific classification
- Domain: Eukaryota
- Kingdom: Animalia
- Phylum: Arthropoda
- Class: Insecta
- Order: Lepidoptera
- Family: Sphingidae
- Tribe: Sphingini
- Genus: Pseudodolbina; Rothschild, 1894

= Pseudodolbina =

Genus of moths

Pseudodolbina is a genus of moths in the family Sphingidae. The genus was erected by Walter Rothschild in 1894.

== Species ==
- Pseudodolbina aequalis Rothschild & Jordan 1903
- Pseudodolbina fo (Walker 1856)
  - Pseudodolbina fo celator Jordan, 1926
