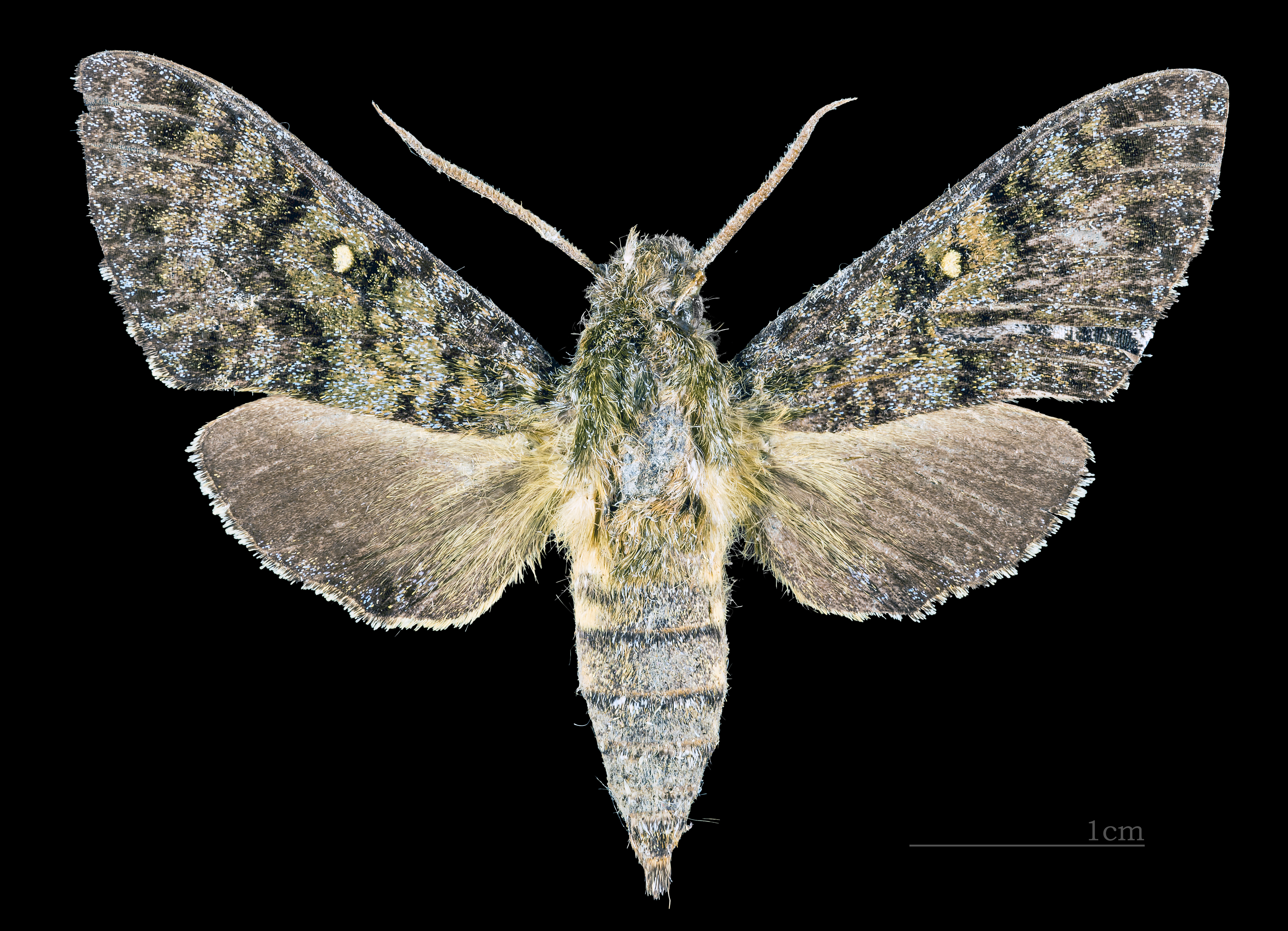
- Male dorsal MHNT
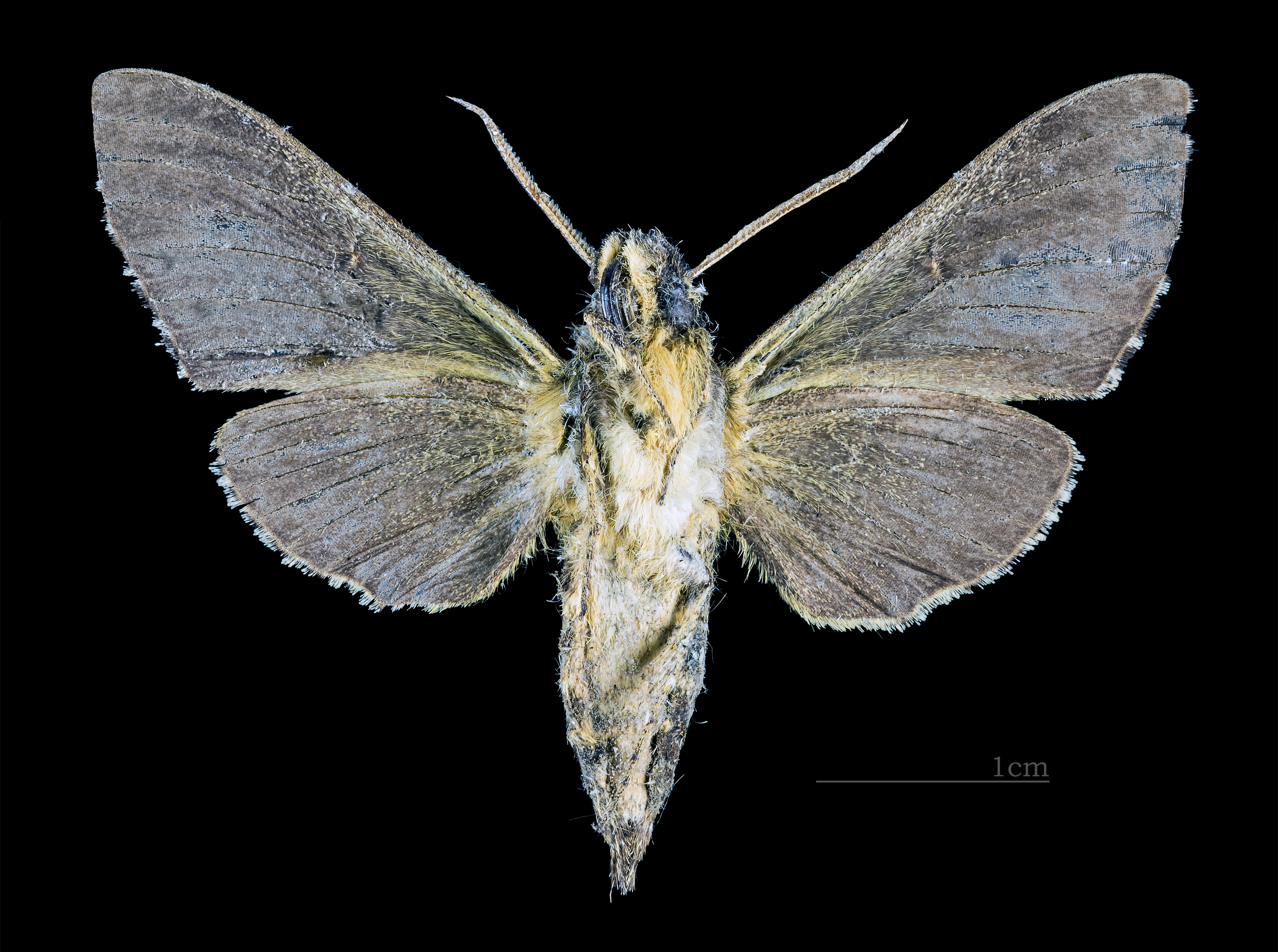
- Male ventral MHNT

Scientific classification
- Domain: Eukaryota
- Kingdom: Animalia
- Phylum: Arthropoda
- Class: Insecta
- Order: Lepidoptera
- Family: Sphingidae
- Genus: Pseudodolbina
- Species: P. fo

Binomial name
- Pseudodolbina fo (Walker, 1856)

Synonyms
- Zonilia fo Walker, 1856; Pseudodolbina veloxina Rothschild, 1894

= Pseudodolbina fo =

Species of moth

Pseudodolbina fo, the acanthus hawkmoth, is a moth of the family Sphingidae. It is found from Nepal, Bhutan and north-eastern India into Tibet.

The wingspan is 60–68 mm. There is one generation per year.

The larvae have been recorded feeding on Strobilanthes alatus and Strobilanthes dalhousianus in north-eastern India.

== Subspecies ==
- Pseudodolbina fo fo (Nepal, Bhutan and north-eastern India into Tibet, China)
- Pseudodolbina fo celator Jordan, 1926 (India)
