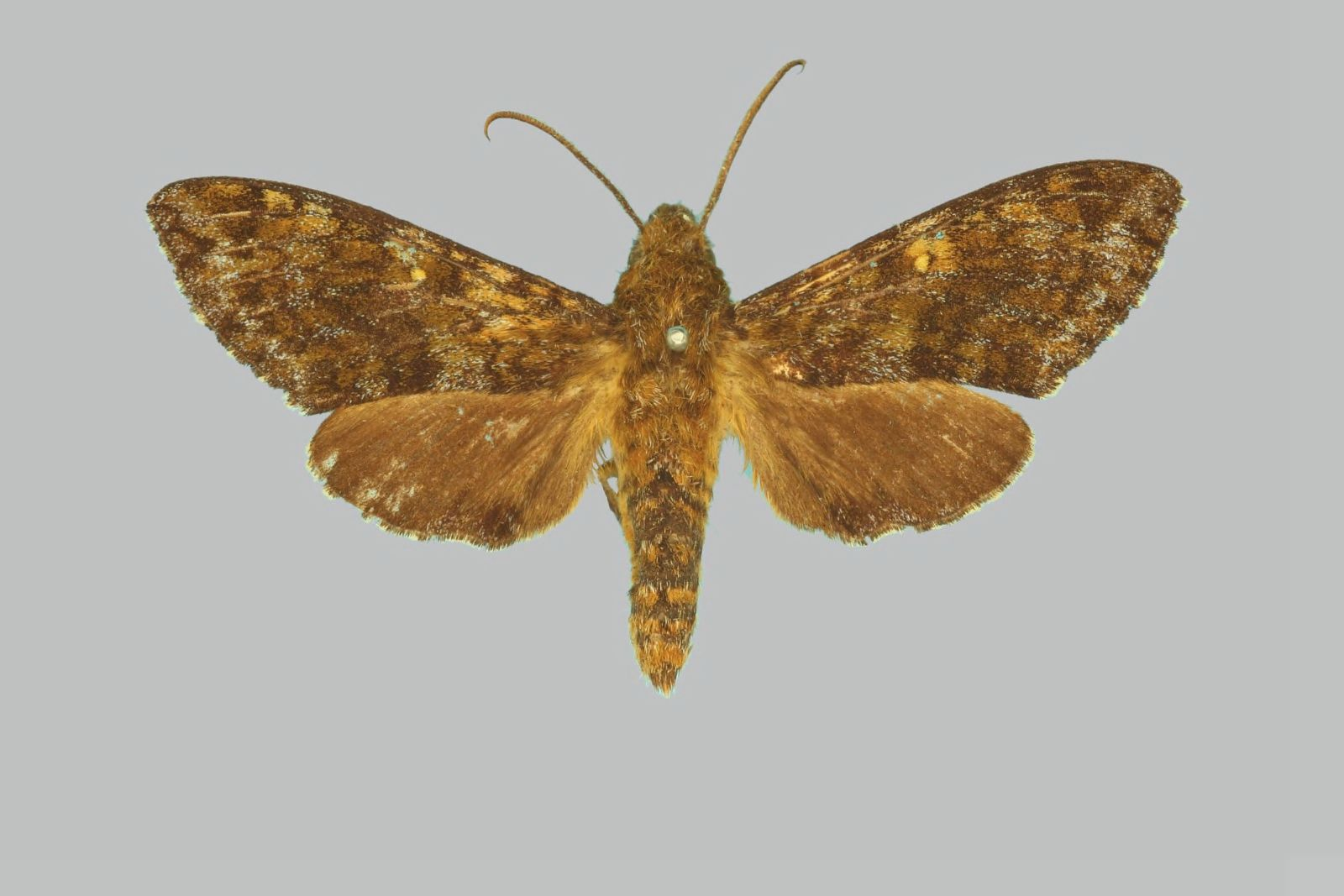
- Pseudodolbina aequalis, male, upperside. India, Cherrapunji.

Scientific classification
- Domain: Eukaryota
- Kingdom: Animalia
- Phylum: Arthropoda
- Class: Insecta
- Order: Lepidoptera
- Family: Sphingidae
- Genus: Pseudodolbina
- Species: P. aequalis

Binomial name
- Pseudodolbina aequalis Rothschild & Jordan, 1903

= Pseudodolbina aequalis =

Species of moth

Pseudodolbina aequalis is a moth of the family Sphingidae. It is known from India.
