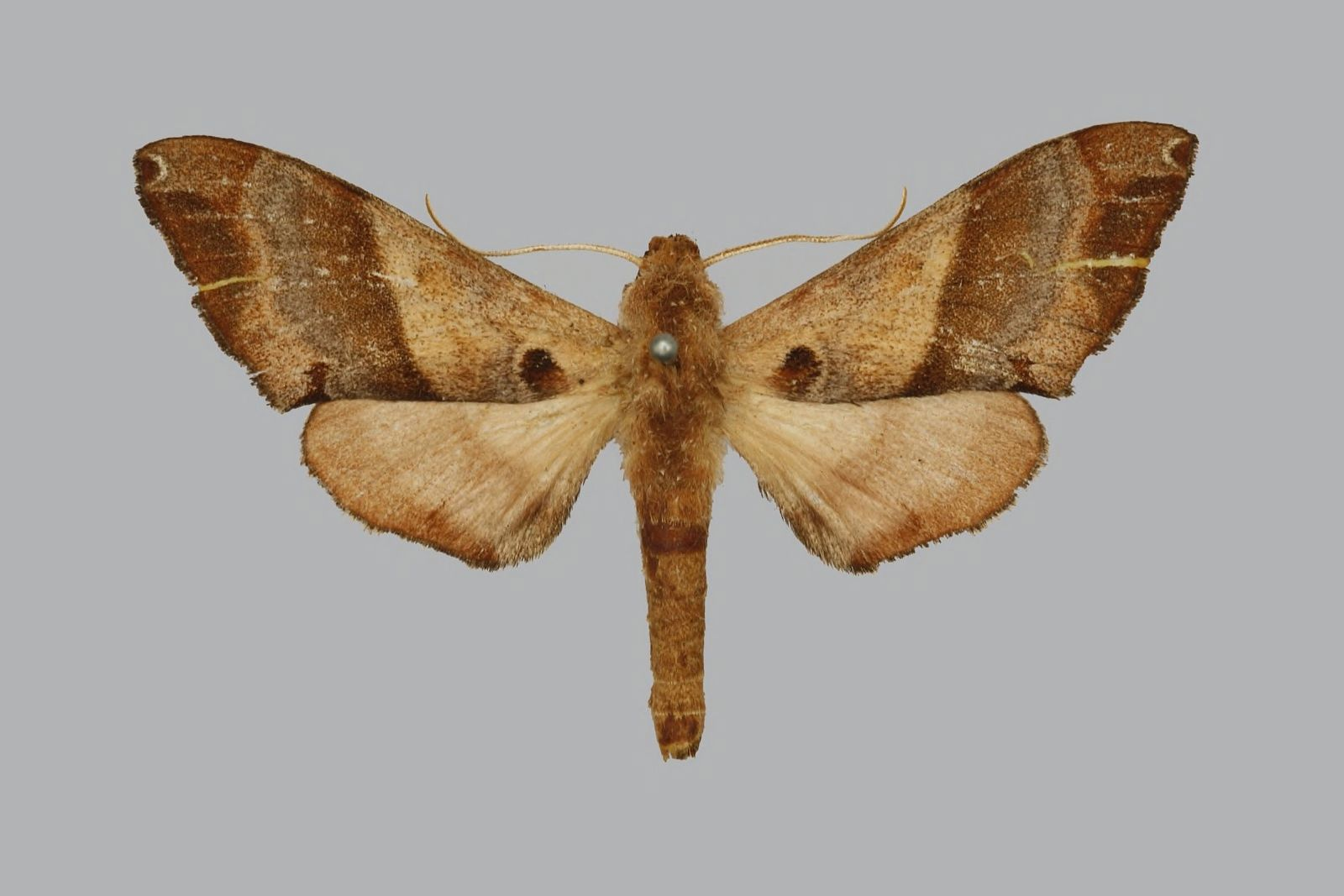

Scientific classification
- Domain: Eukaryota
- Kingdom: Animalia
- Phylum: Arthropoda
- Class: Insecta
- Order: Lepidoptera
- Family: Sphingidae
- Genus: Agnosia
- Species: A. microta

Binomial name
- Agnosia microta (Hampson, 1907)

Synonyms
- Marumba microta Hampson, 1907

= Agnosia microta =

Species of moth

Agnosia microta is a species of moth of the family Sphingidae first described by George Hampson in 1907. It is known from India.
