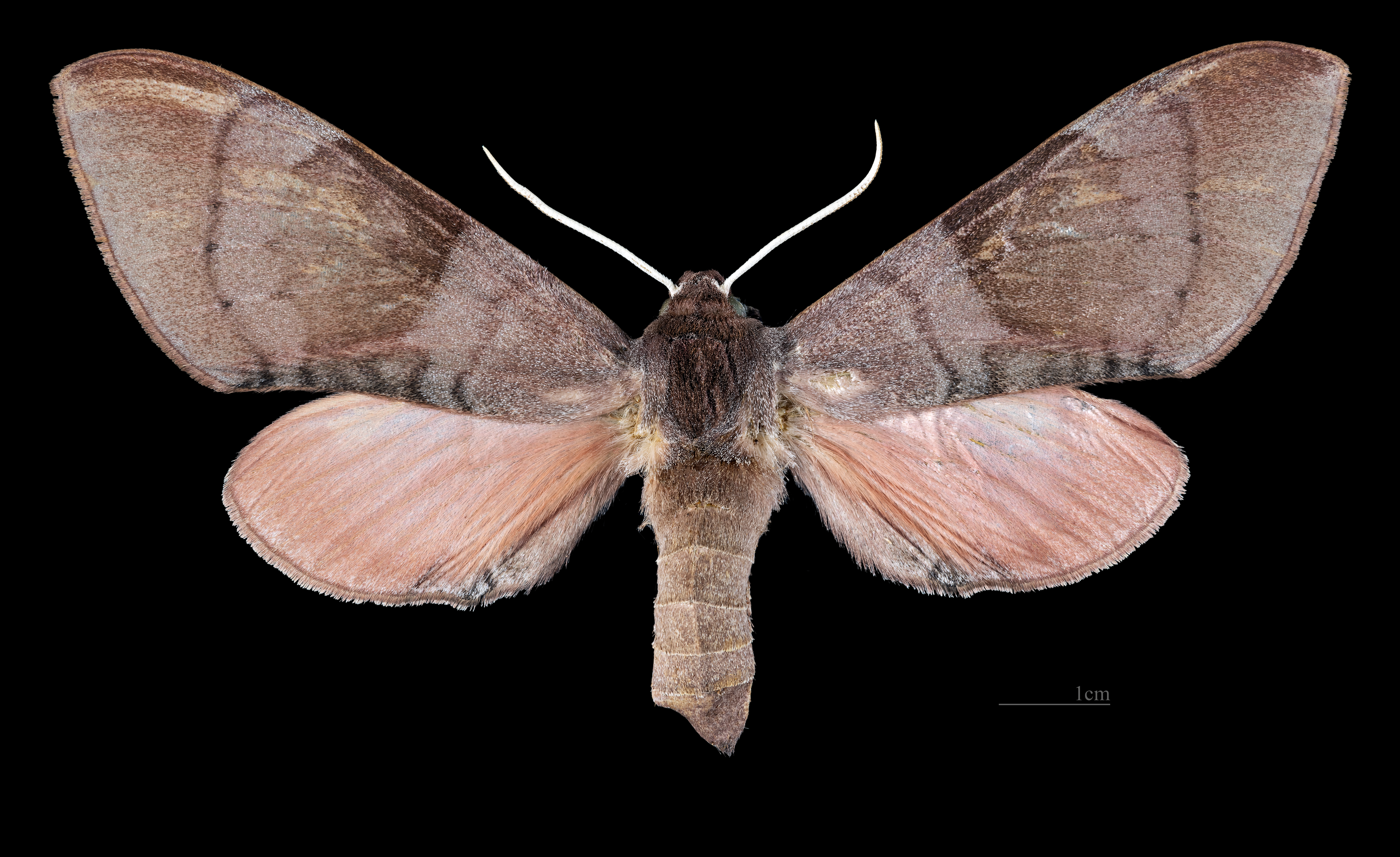
- Agnosia orneus

Scientific classification
- Domain: Eukaryota
- Kingdom: Animalia
- Phylum: Arthropoda
- Class: Insecta
- Order: Lepidoptera
- Family: Sphingidae
- Tribe: Smerinthini
- Genus: Agnosia; Rothschild & Jordan, 1903

= Agnosia (moth) =

Genus of moths

Agnosia is a genus of moths in the family Sphingidae first described by Walter Rothschild and Karl Jordan in 1903.

== Species ==
- Agnosia microta (Hampson 1907)
- Agnosia orneus (Westwood 1847)
