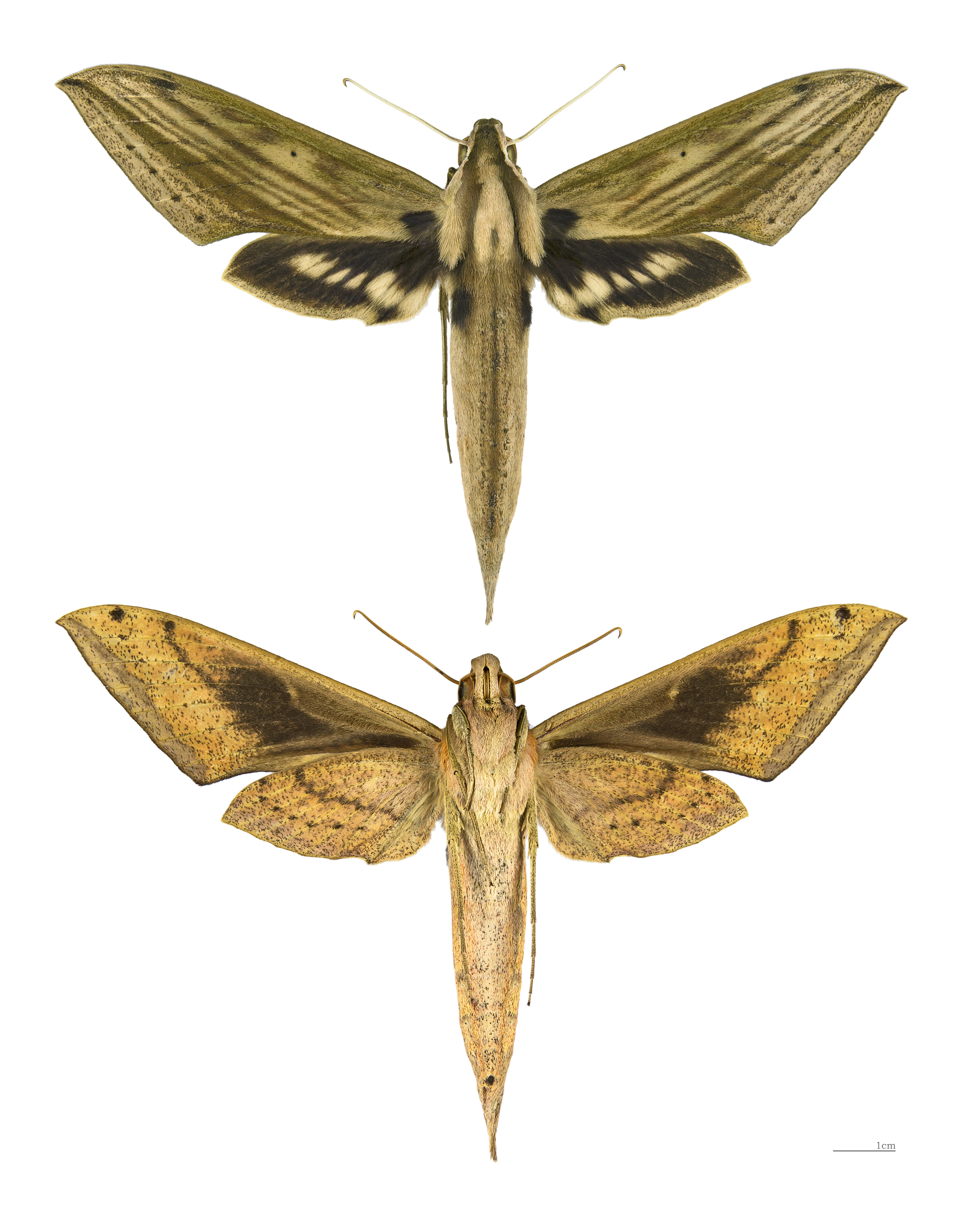
- Xylophanes anubus (type species)

Scientific classification
- Domain: Eukaryota
- Kingdom: Animalia
- Phylum: Arthropoda
- Class: Insecta
- Order: Lepidoptera
- Family: Sphingidae
- Subfamily: Macroglossinae
- Tribe: Macroglossini
- Subtribe: Choerocampina
- Genus: Xylophanes; Hübner, 1819

Synonyms
- Deilonche Grote, 1886; Dilonche Kirby, 1897; Isoples Hübner, 1819

= Xylophanes =

Genus of moths

Xylophanes is a genus of moths in the family Sphingidae erected by Jacob Hübner in 1819. As of 2000, there are about 96 species and subspecies included in the genus.

== Species ==
- Xylophanes acrus Rothschild & Jordan, 1910
- Xylophanes adalia (H. Druce, 1881)
- Xylophanes aglaor (Boisduval, 1875)
- Xylophanes alexandrei Haxaire & Vaglia, 2009
- Xylophanes alvarezsierrai Alvarez Corral, 2001
- Xylophanes amadis (Stoll, 1782)
- Xylophanes anubus (Cramer, 1777)
- Xylophanes aristor (Boisduval, 1870)
- Xylophanes balcazari Haxaire & Vaglia, 2008
- Xylophanes barbuti Haxaire & Eitschberger, 2007
- Xylophanes belti (H. Druce, 1878)
- Xylophanes bilineata Gehlen, 1928
- Xylophanes blanca Eitschberger, 2001
- Xylophanes ceratomioides (Grote & Robinson, 1867)
- Xylophanes chiron (Drury, 1773)
- Xylophanes clarki Ramsden, 1921
- Xylophanes colinae Haxaire, 1994
- Xylophanes columbiana Clark, 1935
- Xylophanes cosmius Rothschild & Jordan, 1906
- Xylophanes crenulata Vaglia & Haxaire, 2009
- Xylophanes crotonis (Walker, 1856)
- Xylophanes cthulhu Haxaire & Vaglia, 2008
- Xylophanes cyrene (H. Druce, 1881)
- Xylophanes damocrita (H. Druce, 1894)
- Xylophanes depuiseti (Boisduval, 1875)
- Xylophanes docilis (Butler, 1875)
- Xylophanes dolius (Rothschild & Jordan, 1906)
- Xylophanes elara (H. Druce, 1878)
- Xylophanes epaphus (Boisduval, 1875)
- Xylophanes eumedon (Boisduval, 1875)
- Xylophanes falco (Walker, 1856)
- Xylophanes fassli Gehlen, 1928
- Xylophanes fernandezi Chacin, Clavijo & De Marmels, 1996
- Xylophanes ferotinus Gehlen, 1930
- Xylophanes fosteri Rothschild & Jordan, 1906
- Xylophanes furtadoi Haxaire, 2009
- Xylophanes fusimacula (R. Felder, 1874)
- Xylophanes germen (Schaus, 1890)
- Xylophanes godmani (H. Druce, 1882)
- Xylophanes guianensis (Rothschild, 1894)
- Xylophanes gundlachii (Herrich-Schäffer, 1863)
- Xylophanes hannemanni Closs, 1917
- Xylophanes haxairei Cadiou, 1985
- Xylophanes huloti Haxaire & Vaglia, 2008
- Xylophanes hydrata Rothschild & Jordan, 1903
- Xylophanes indistincta Closs, 1915
- Xylophanes irrorata (Grote, 1865)
- Xylophanes isaon (Boisduval, 1875)
- Xylophanes jamaicensis Clark, 1935
- Xylophanes jordani Clark, 1916
- Xylophanes josephinae Clark, 1920
- Xylophanes juanita Rothschild & Jordan, 1903
- Xylophanes kaempferi Clark, 1931
- Xylophanes katharinae Clark, 1931
- Xylophanes kiefferi Cadiou, 1995
- Xylophanes lamontagnei Vaglia & Haxaire, 2007
- Xylophanes letiranti Vaglia & Haxaire, 2003
- Xylophanes libya (H. Druce, 1878)
- Xylophanes lichyi Kitching & Cadiou, 2000
- Xylophanes lissyi Eitschberger, 2001
- Xylophanes loelia (H. Druce, 1878)
- Xylophanes lolita Haxaire & Vaglia, 2008
- Xylophanes macasensis Clark, 1922
- Xylophanes maculator (Boisduval, 1875)
- Xylophanes marginalis Clark, 1917
- Xylophanes media Rothschild & Jordan, 1903
- Xylophanes meridanus Rothschild & Jordan, 1910
- Xylophanes mineti Haxaire & Vaglia, 2004
- Xylophanes mirabilis Clark, 1916
- Xylophanes monzoni Haxaire & Eitschberger, 2003
- Xylophanes mossi Clark, 1917
- Xylophanes mulleri Clark, 1920
- Xylophanes nabuchodonosor Oberthür, 1904
- Xylophanes neoptolemus (Cramer, 1780)
- Xylophanes norfolki Kernbach, 1962
- Xylophanes obscurus Rothschild & Jordan, 1910
- Xylophanes ockendeni Rothschild, 1904
- Xylophanes pearsoni Soares & Motta, 2002
- Xylophanes pistacina (Boisduval, 1875)
- Xylophanes ploetzi (Moschler, 1876)
- Xylophanes pluto (Fabricius, 1777)
- Xylophanes porcus (Hübner, 1823)
- Xylophanes porioni Cadiou, 2000
- Xylophanes pyrrhus Rothschild & Jordan, 1906
- Xylophanes resta Rothschild & Jordan, 1903
- Xylophanes rhodina Rothschild & Jordan, 1903
- Xylophanes rhodocera (Walker, 1856)
- Xylophanes rhodochlora Rothschild & Jordan, 1903
- Xylophanes rhodotus Rothschild, 1904
- Xylophanes robinsonii (Grote, 1865)
- Xylophanes rothschildi (Dognin, 1895)
- Xylophanes rufescens (Rothschild, 1894)
- Xylophanes sarae Haxaire, 1989
- Xylophanes schausi (Rothschild, 1894)
- Xylophanes schreiteri Clark, 1923
- Xylophanes schwartzi Haxaire, 1992
- Xylophanes staudingeri (Rothschild, 1894)
- Xylophanes suana (H. Druce, 1889)
- Xylophanes tersa (Linnaeus, 1771)
- Xylophanes thyelia (Linnaeus, 1758)
- Xylophanes titana (H. Druce, 1878)
- Xylophanes turbata (H. Edwards, 1887)
- Xylophanes tyndarus (Boisduval, 1875)
- Xylophanes undata Rothschild & Jordan, 1903
- Xylophanes vagliai Haxaire, 2003
- Xylophanes virescens (Butler, 1875)
- Xylophanes xylobotes (Burmeister, 1878)
- Xylophanes zurcheri (H. Druce, 1894)
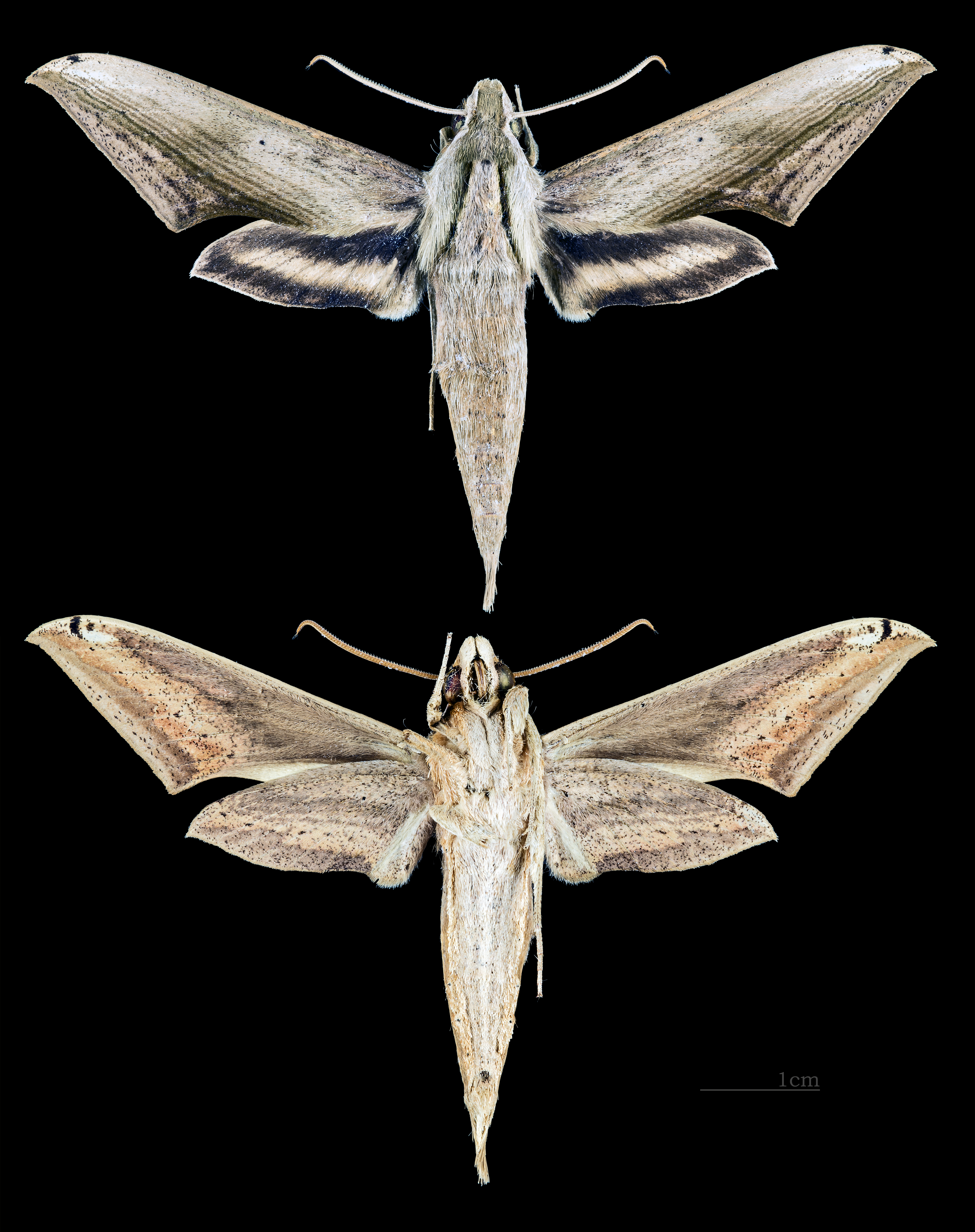
Xylophanes aglaor

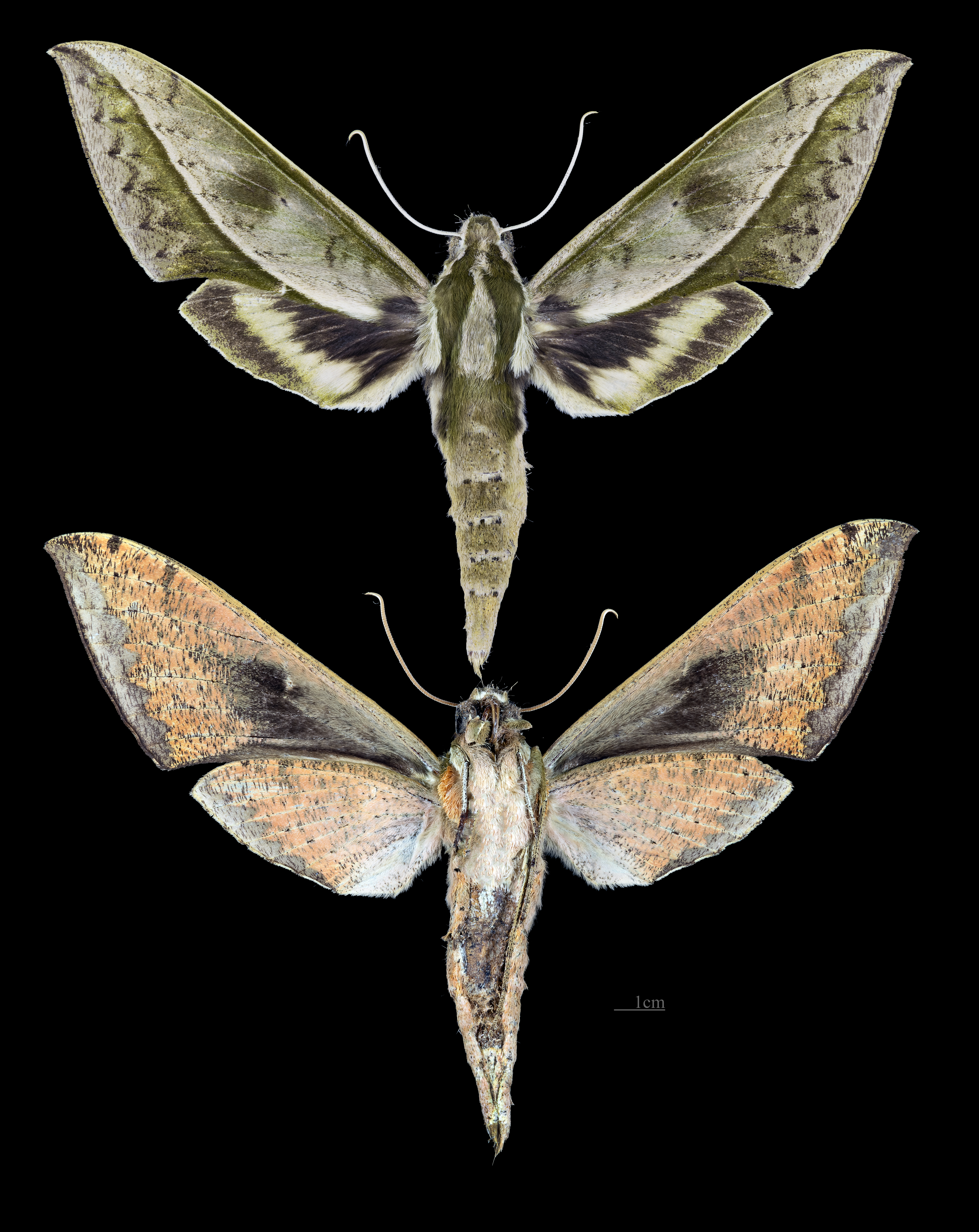
Xylophanes amadis

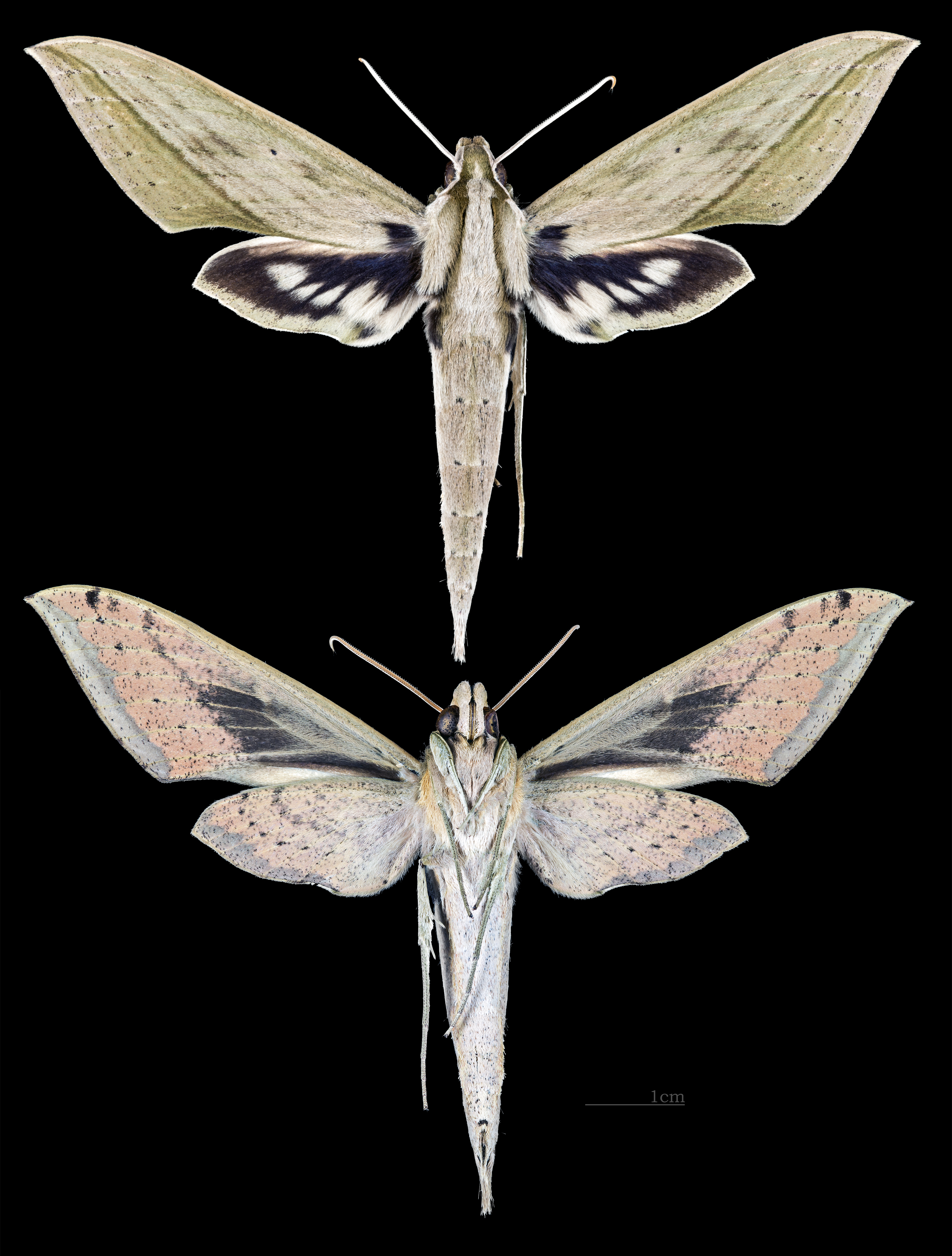
Xylophanes anubus

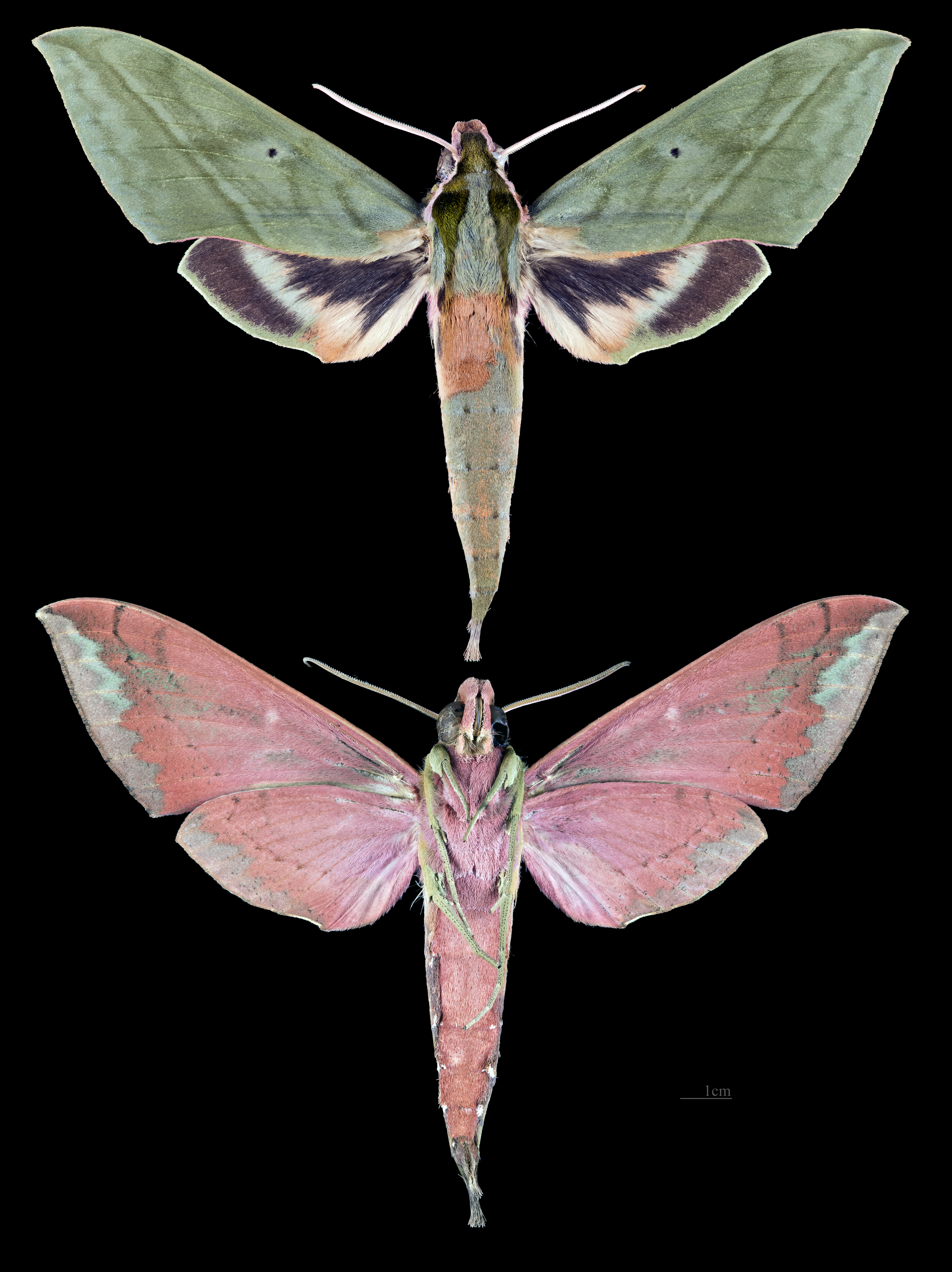
Xylophanes belti

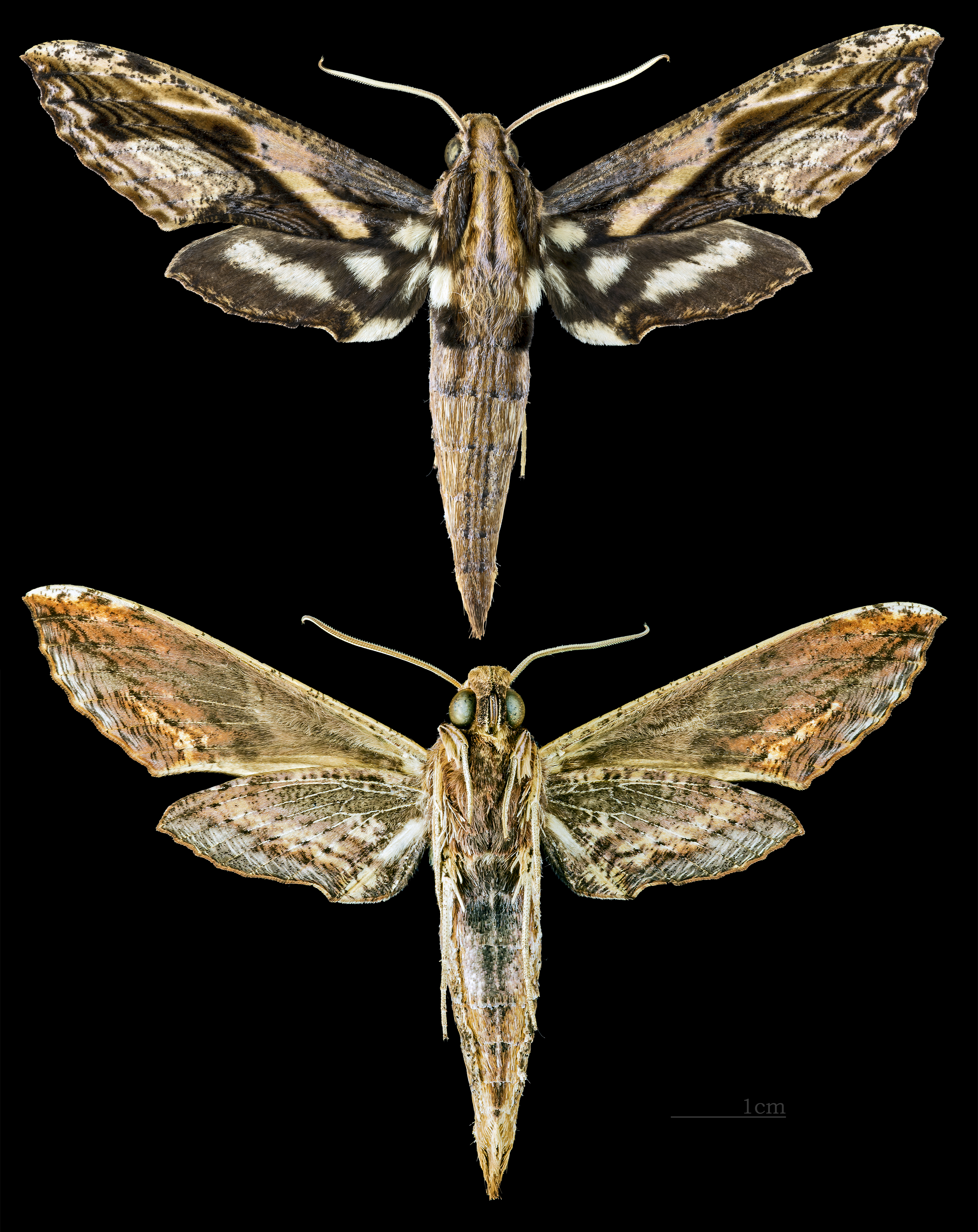
Xylophanes ceratomioides

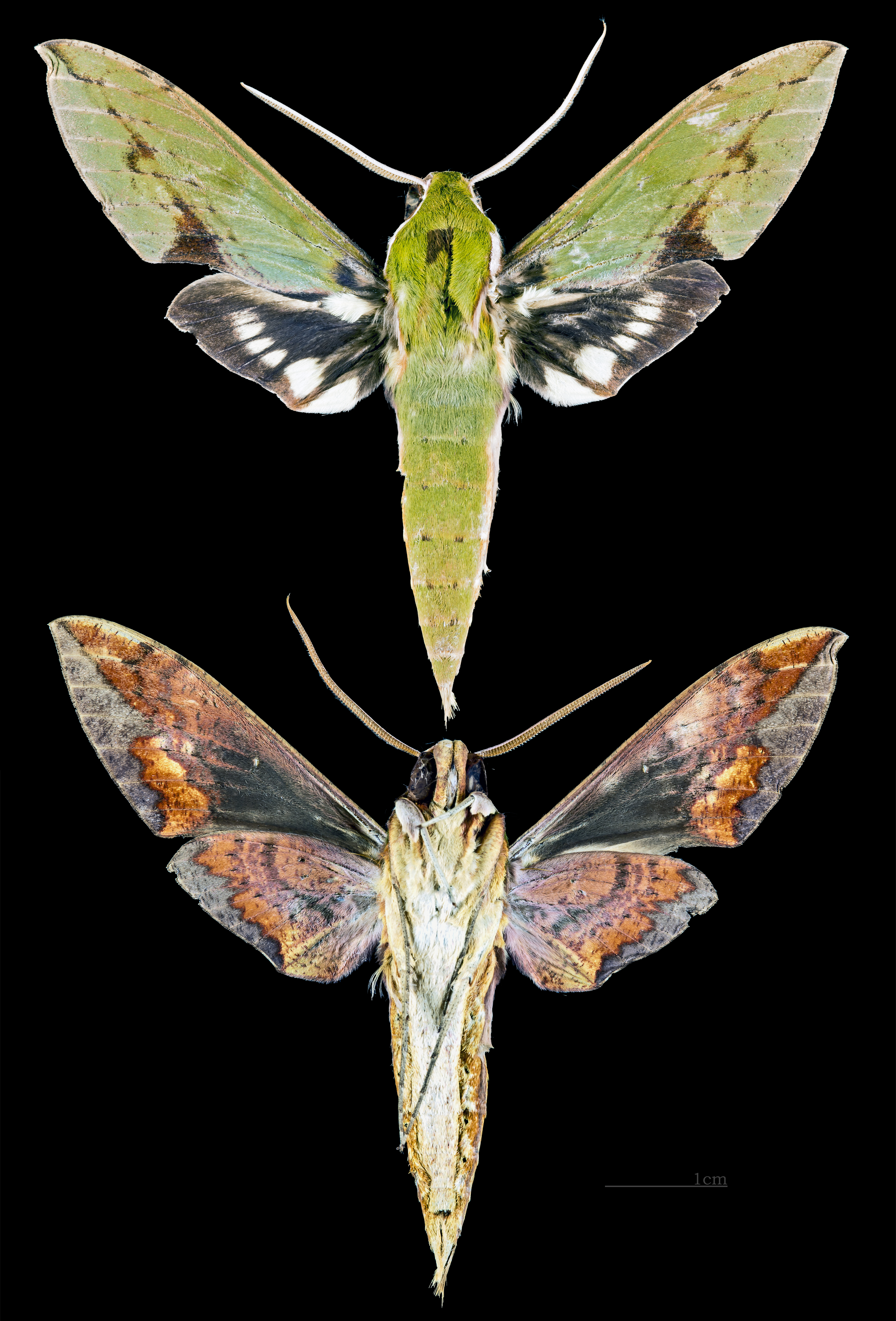
Xylophanes chiron

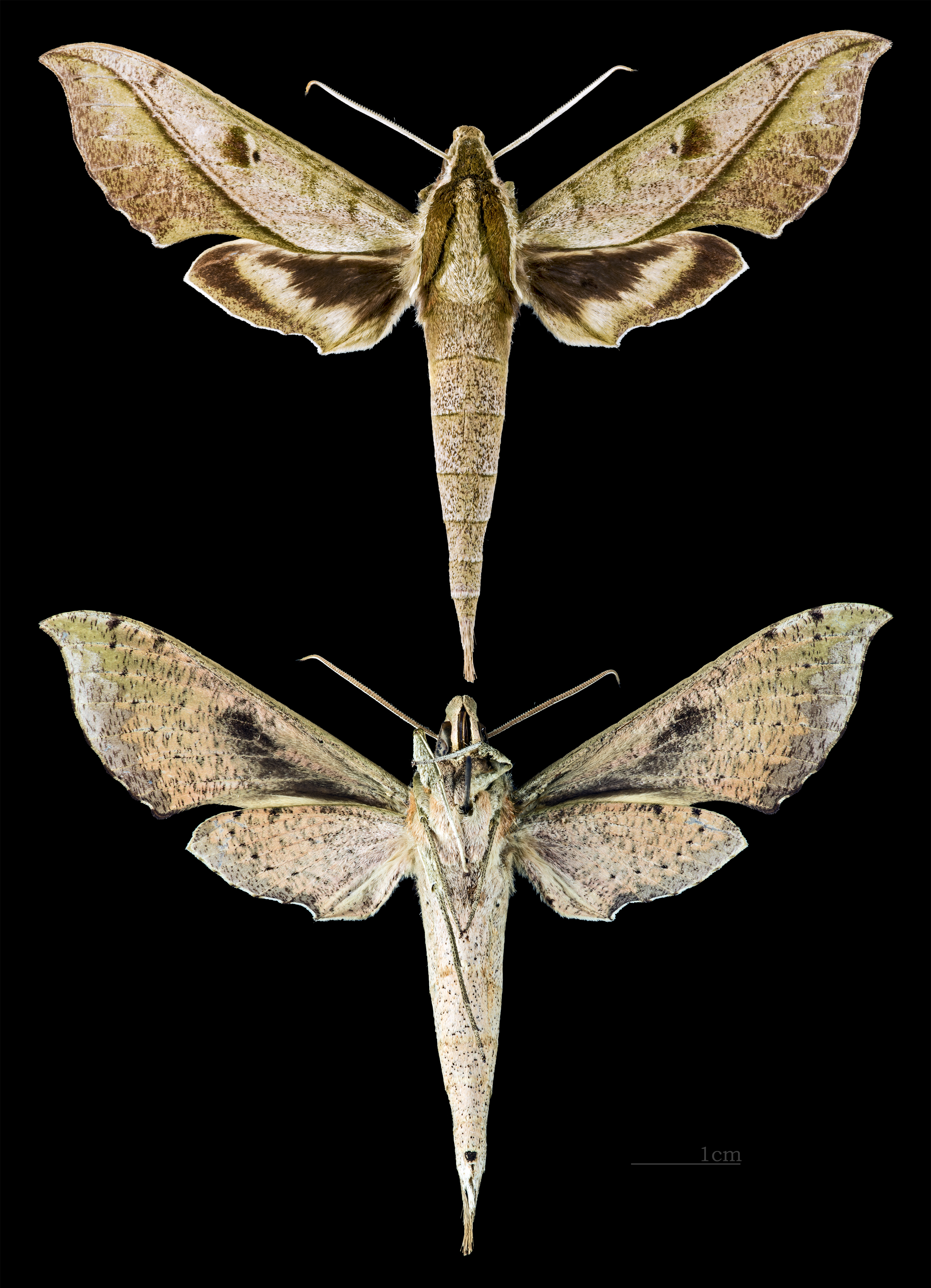
Xylophanes cosmius

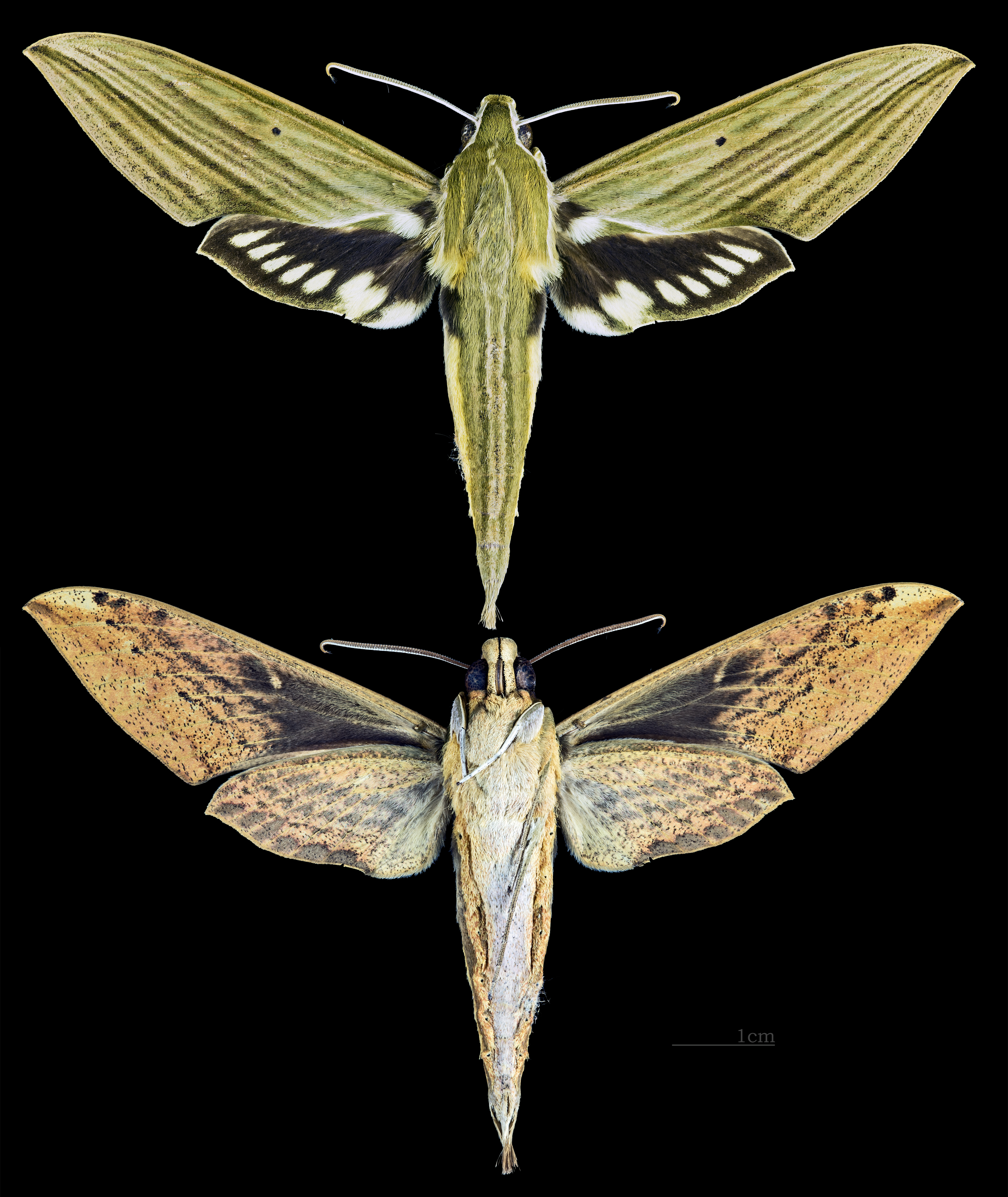
Xylophanes crotonis

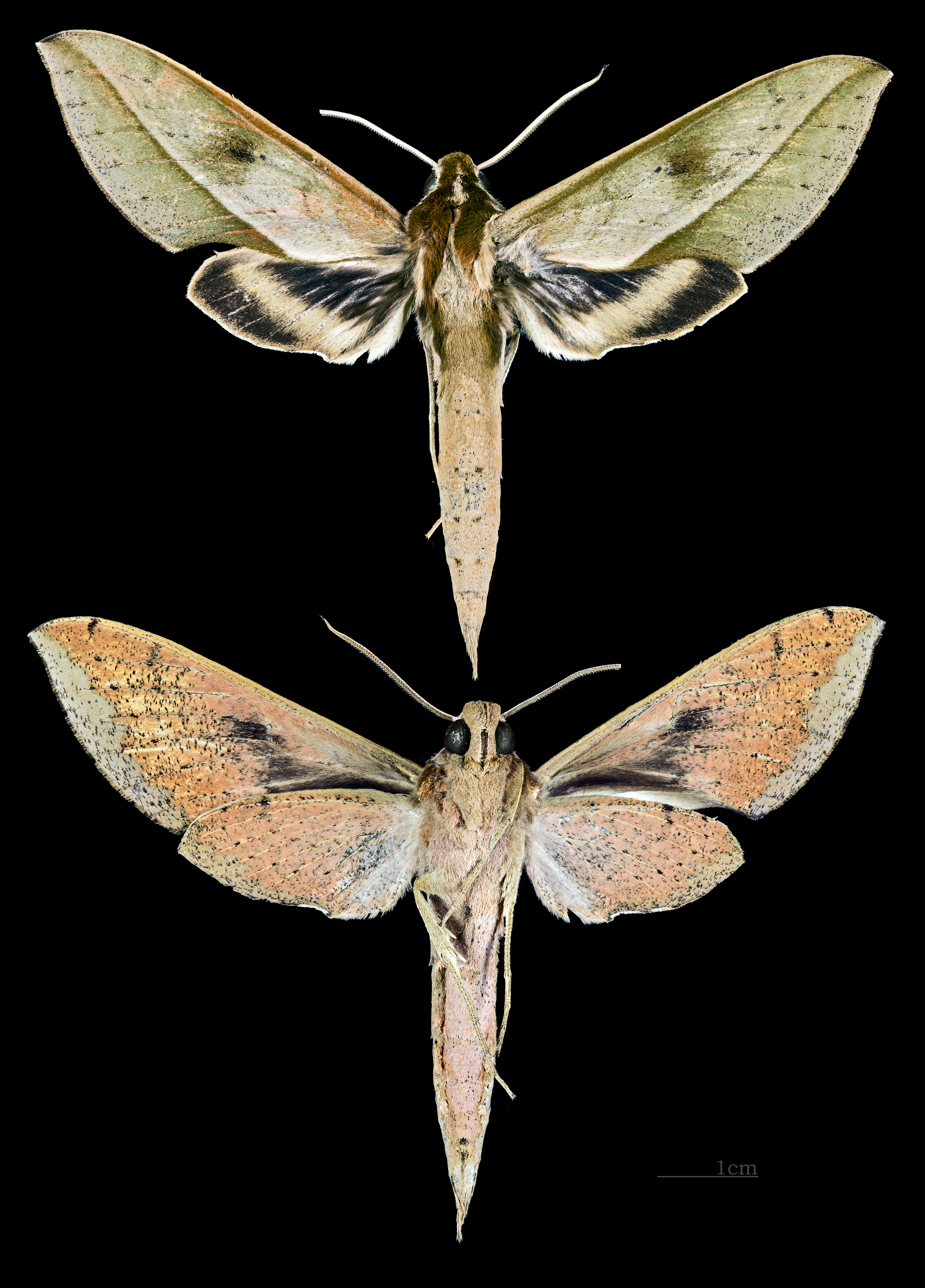
Xylophanes cyrene

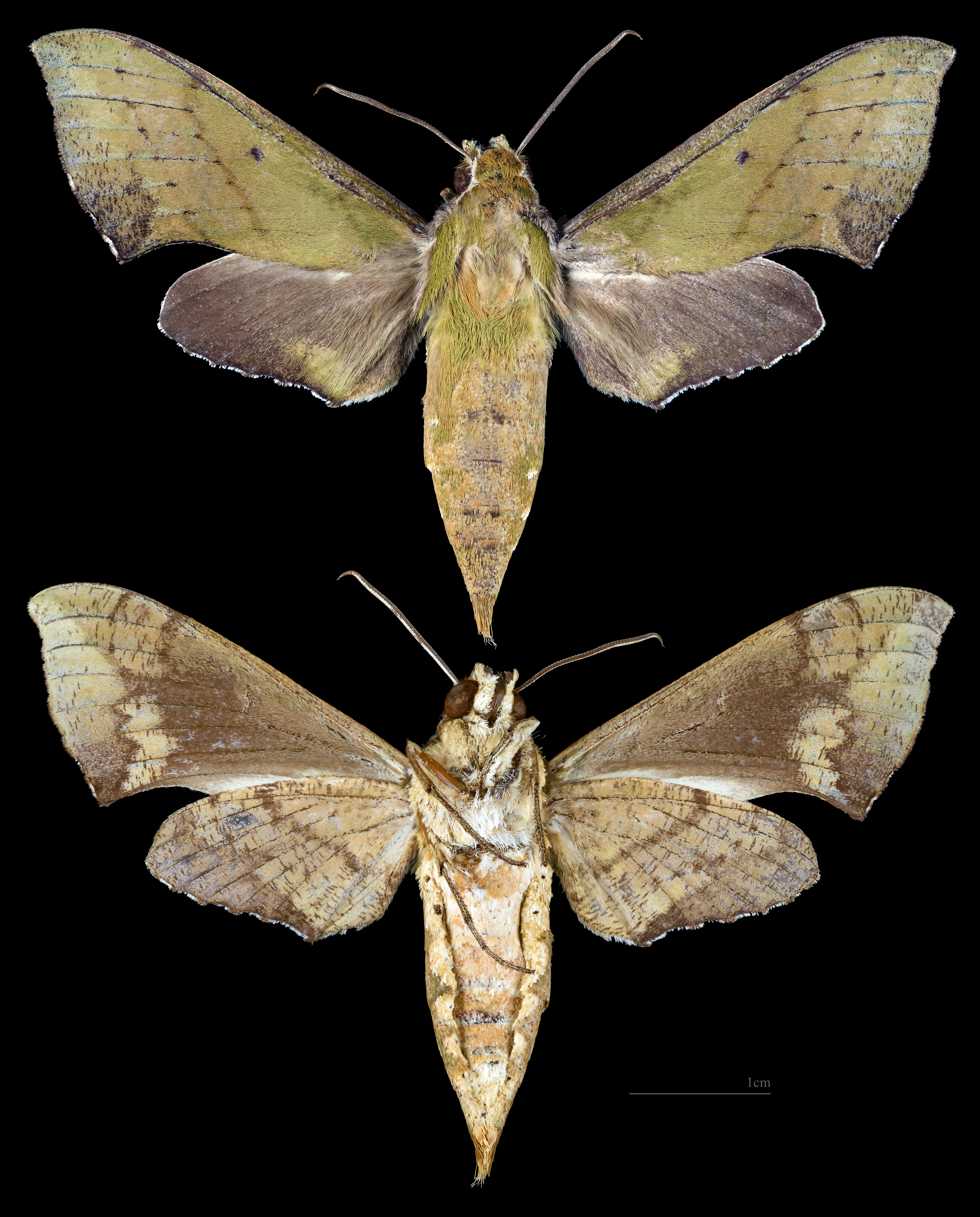
Xylophanes depuiseti

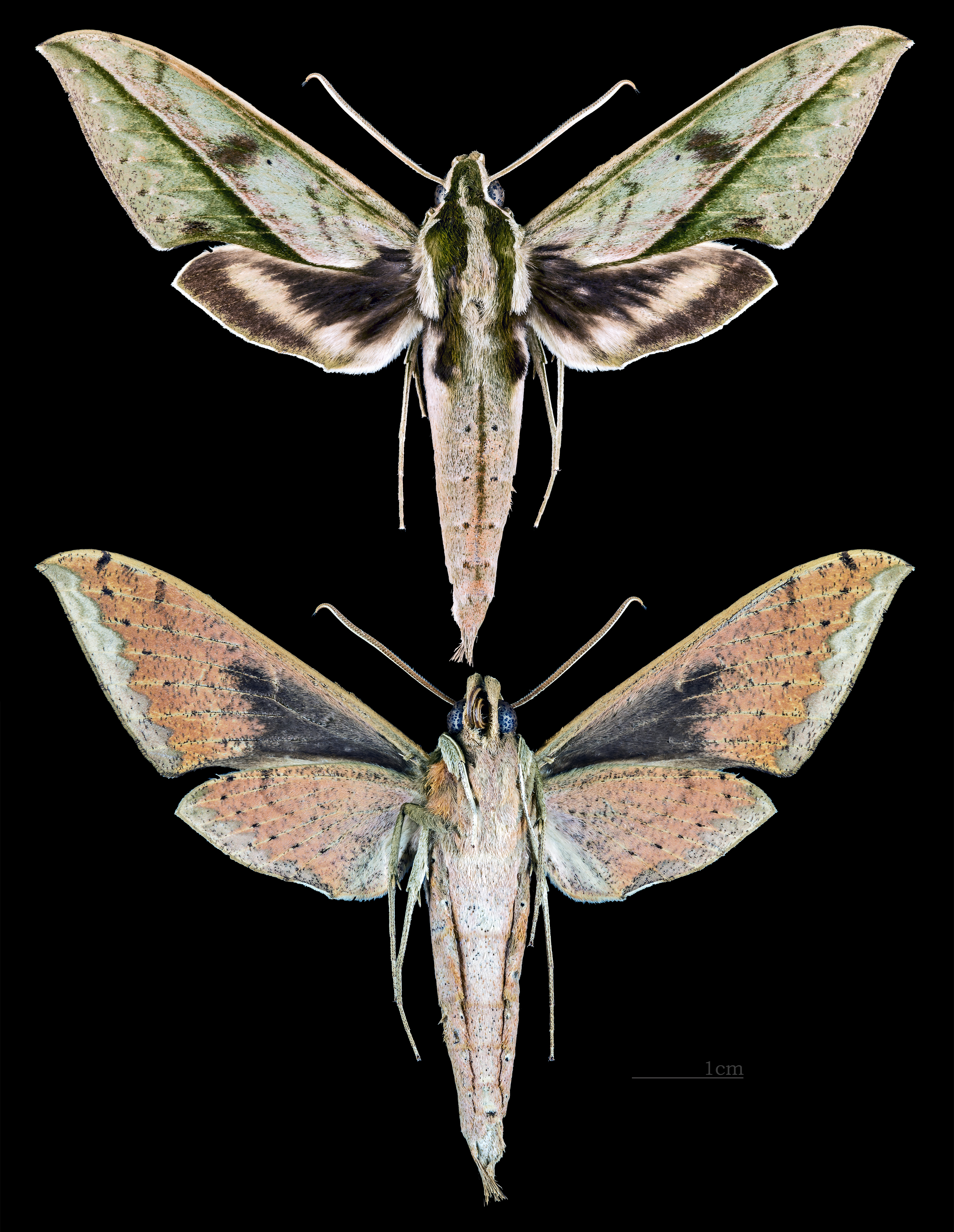
Xylophanes docilis

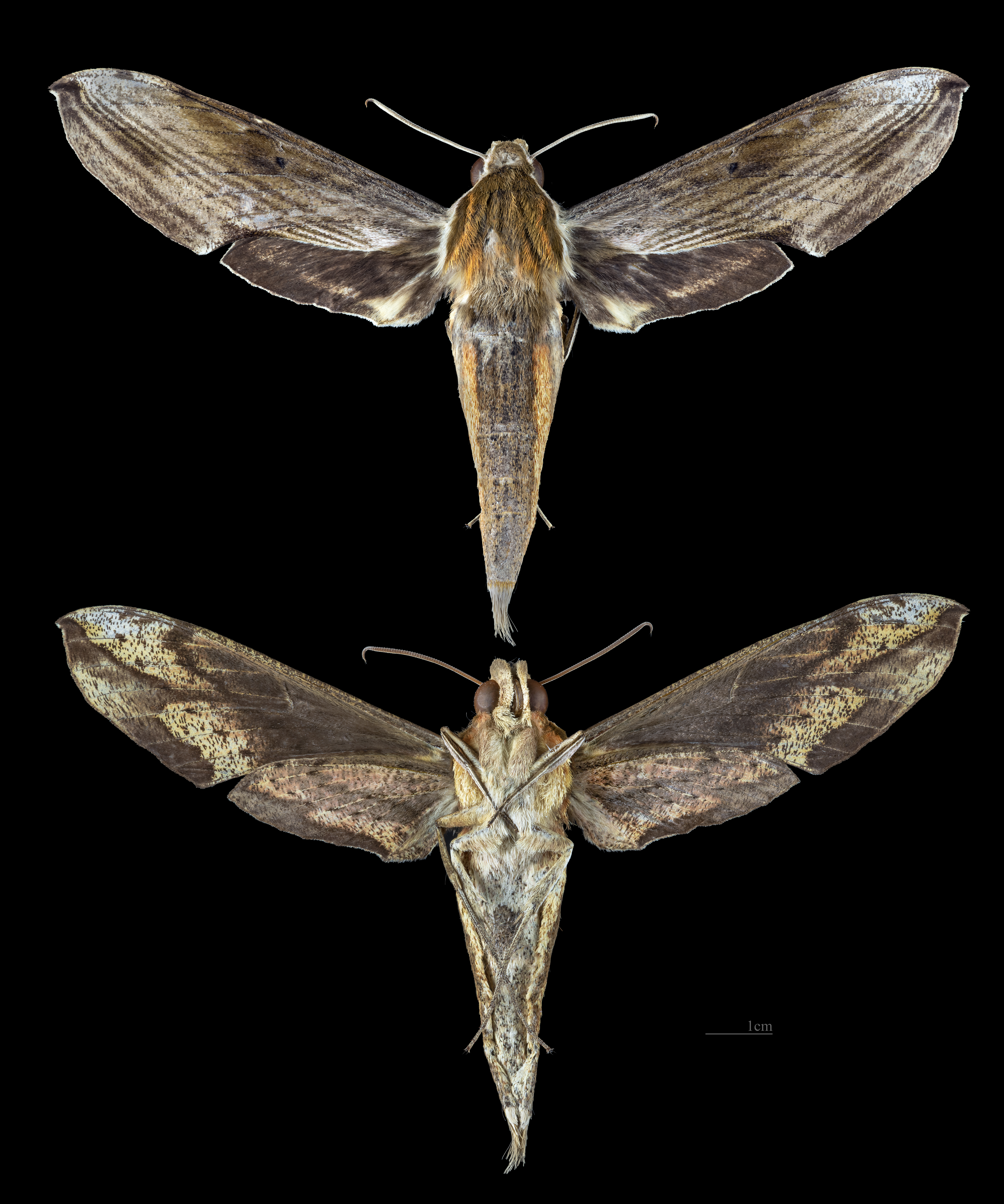
Xylophanes dolius

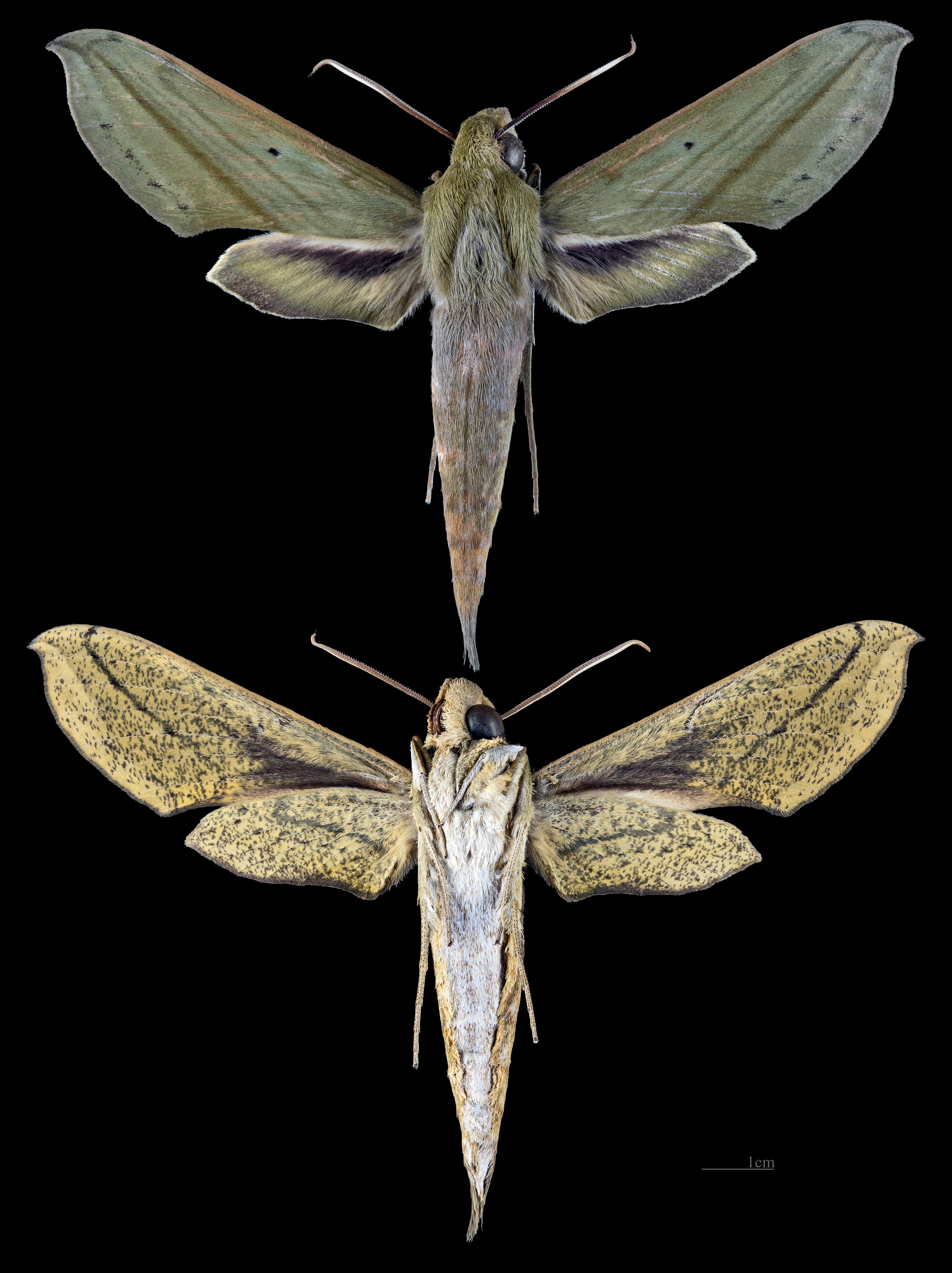
Xylophanes elara

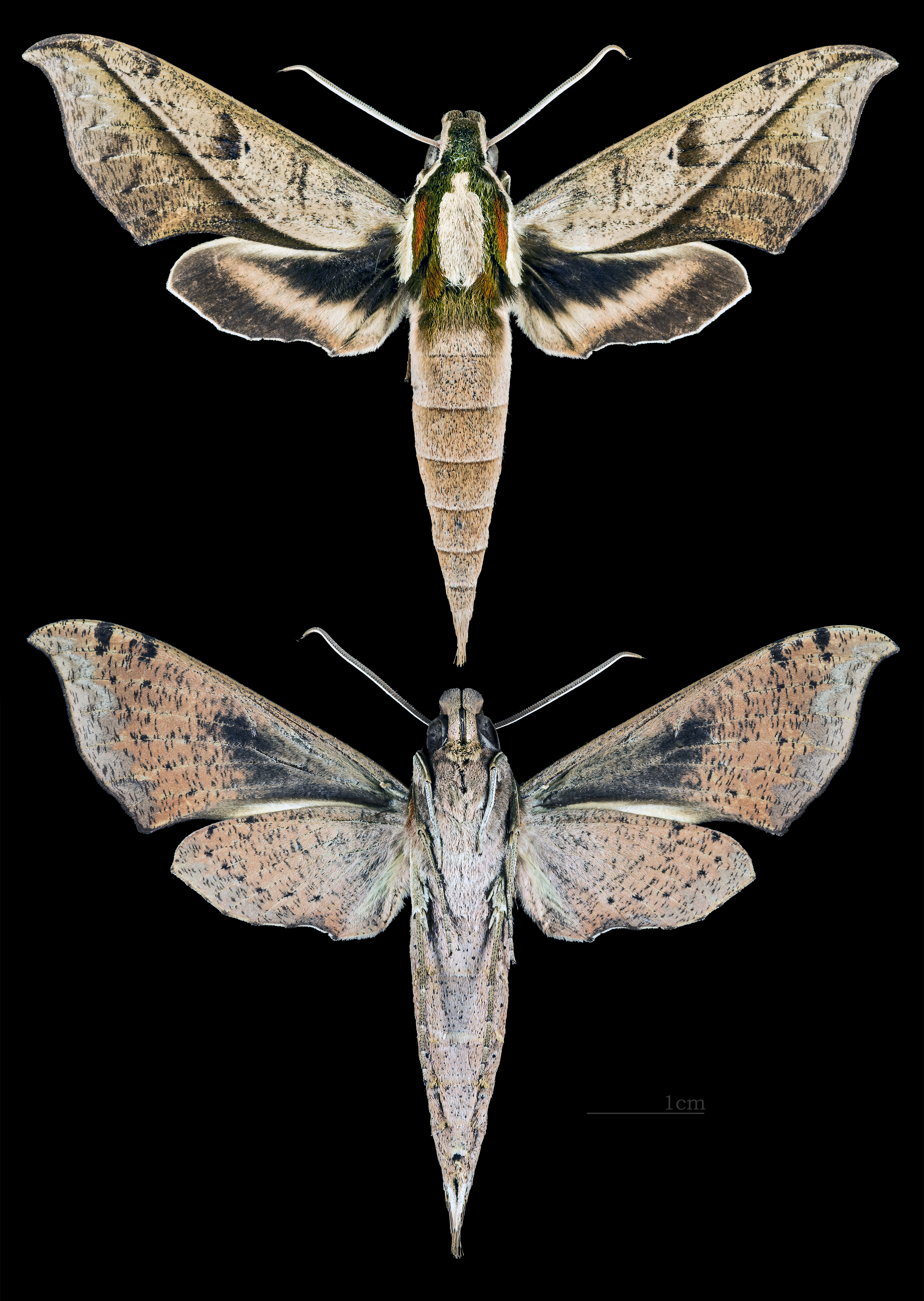
Xylophanes epaphus

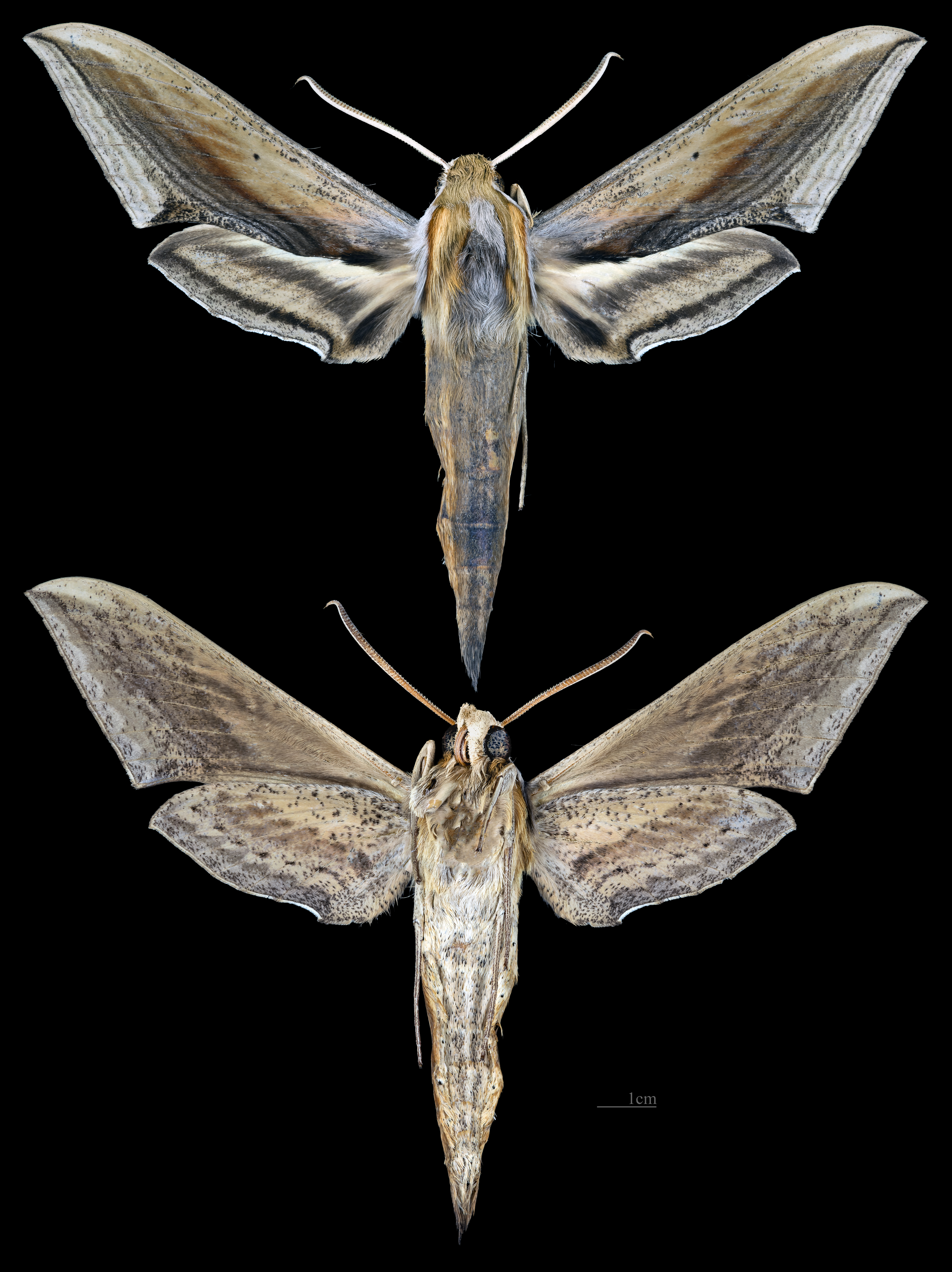
Xylophanes falco

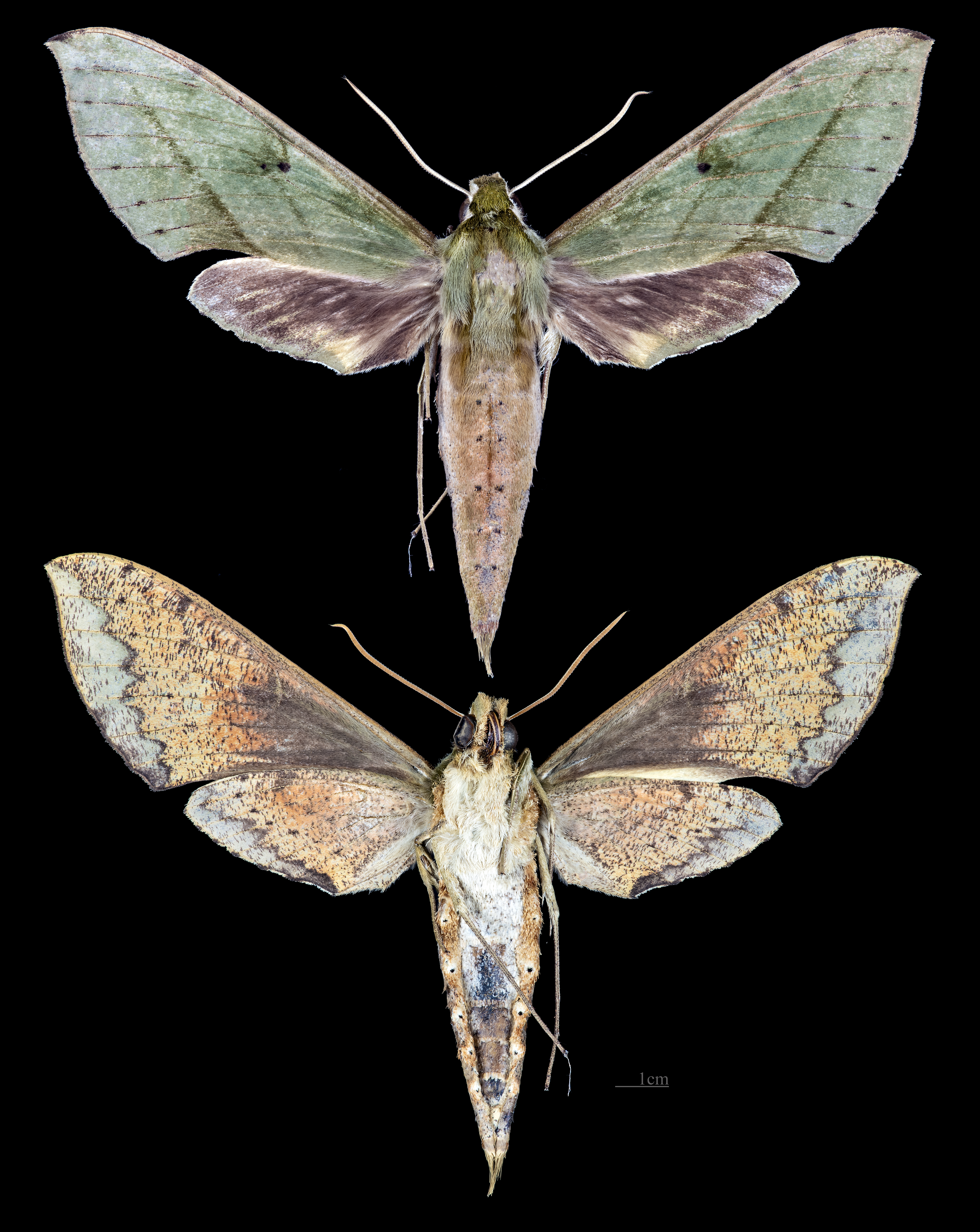
Xylophanes fassli

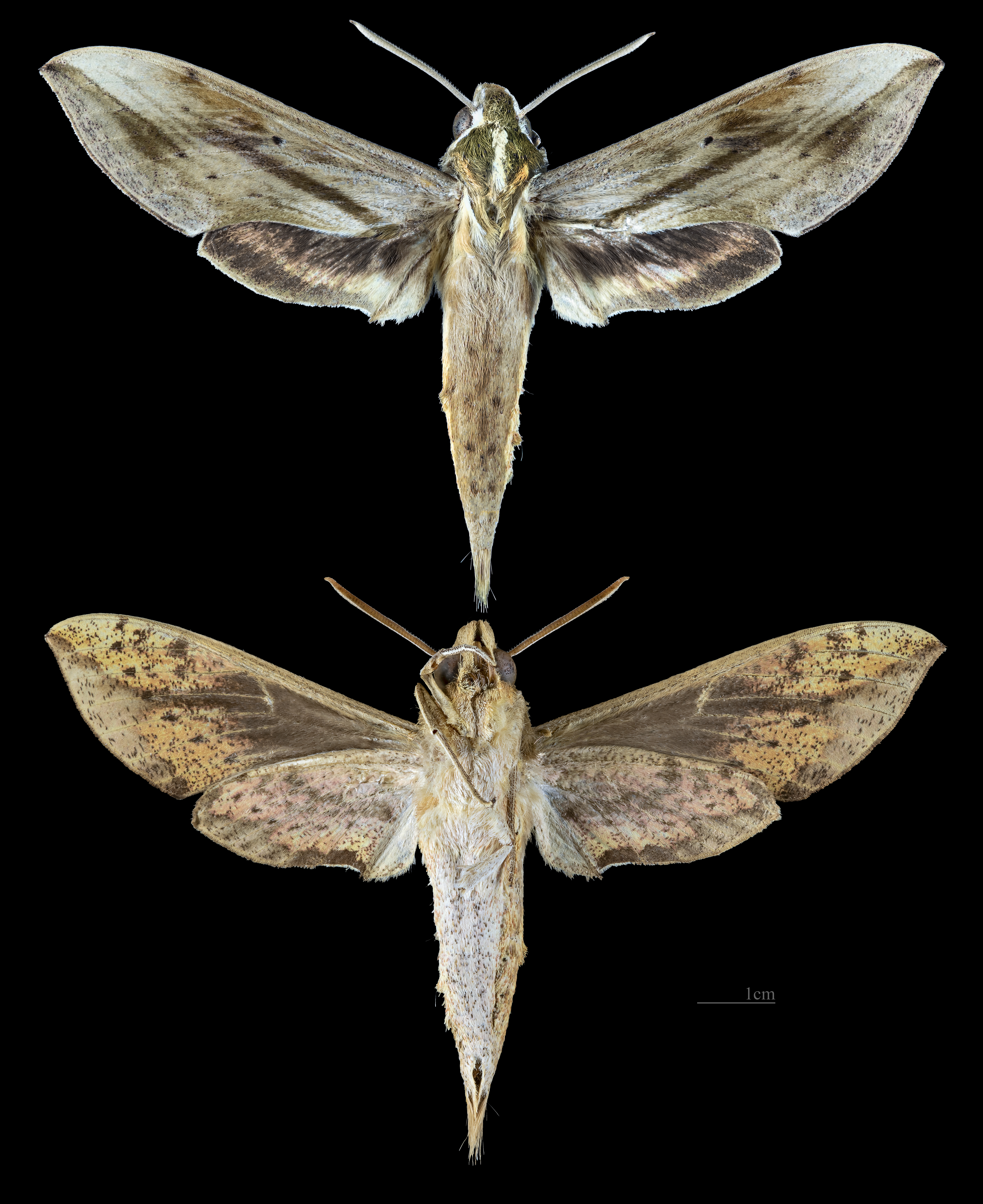
Xylophanes fosteri

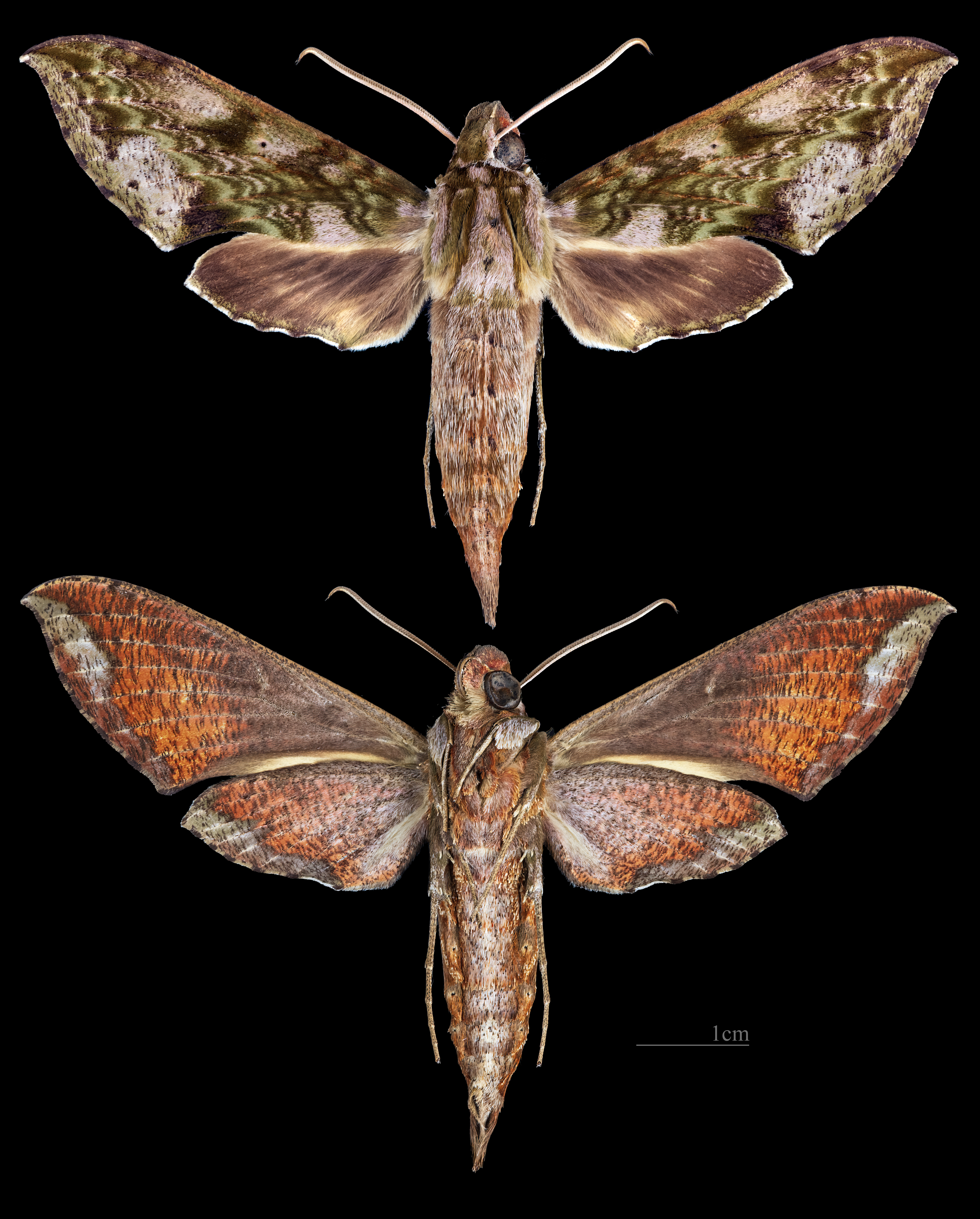
Xylophanes fusimacula

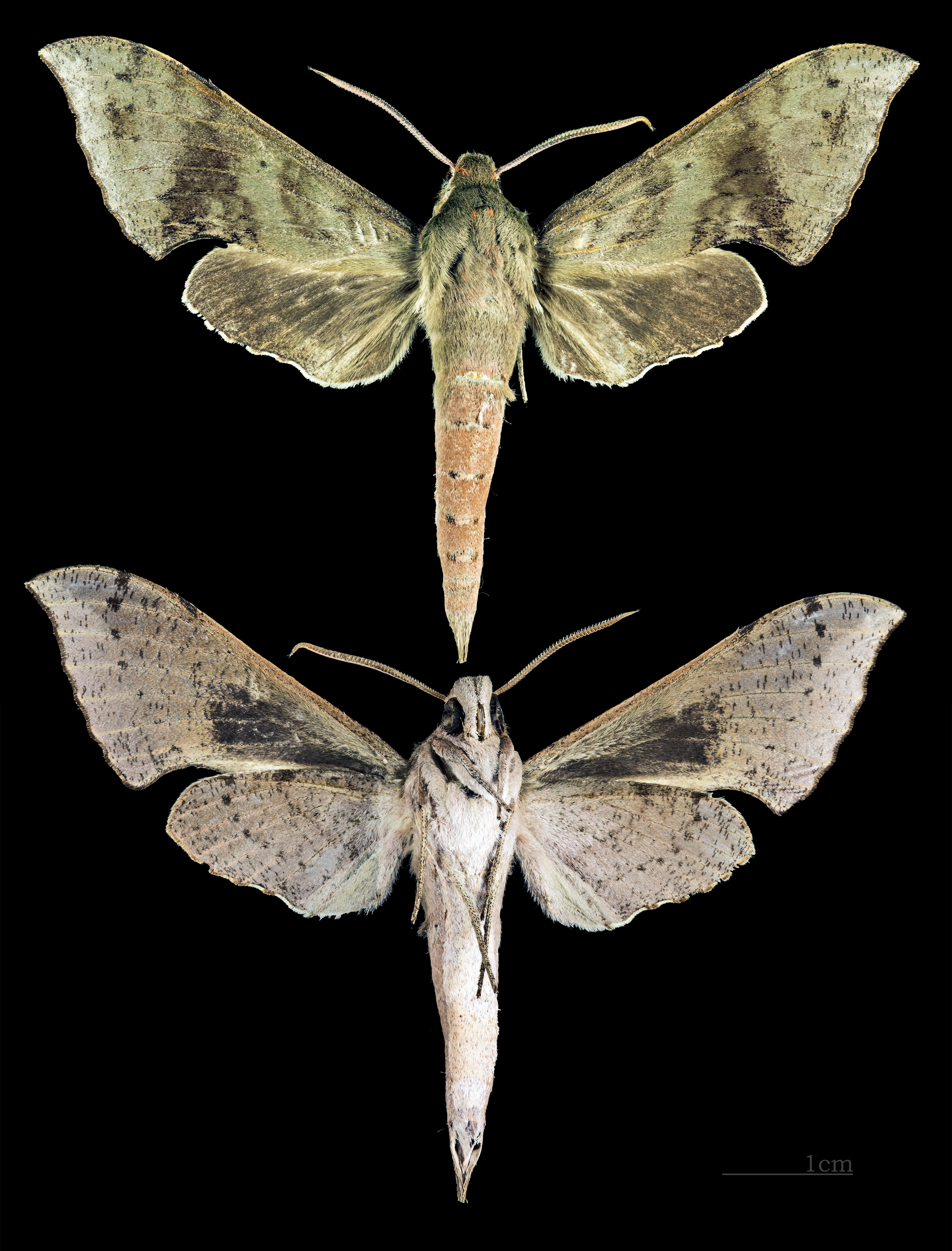
Xylophanes germen

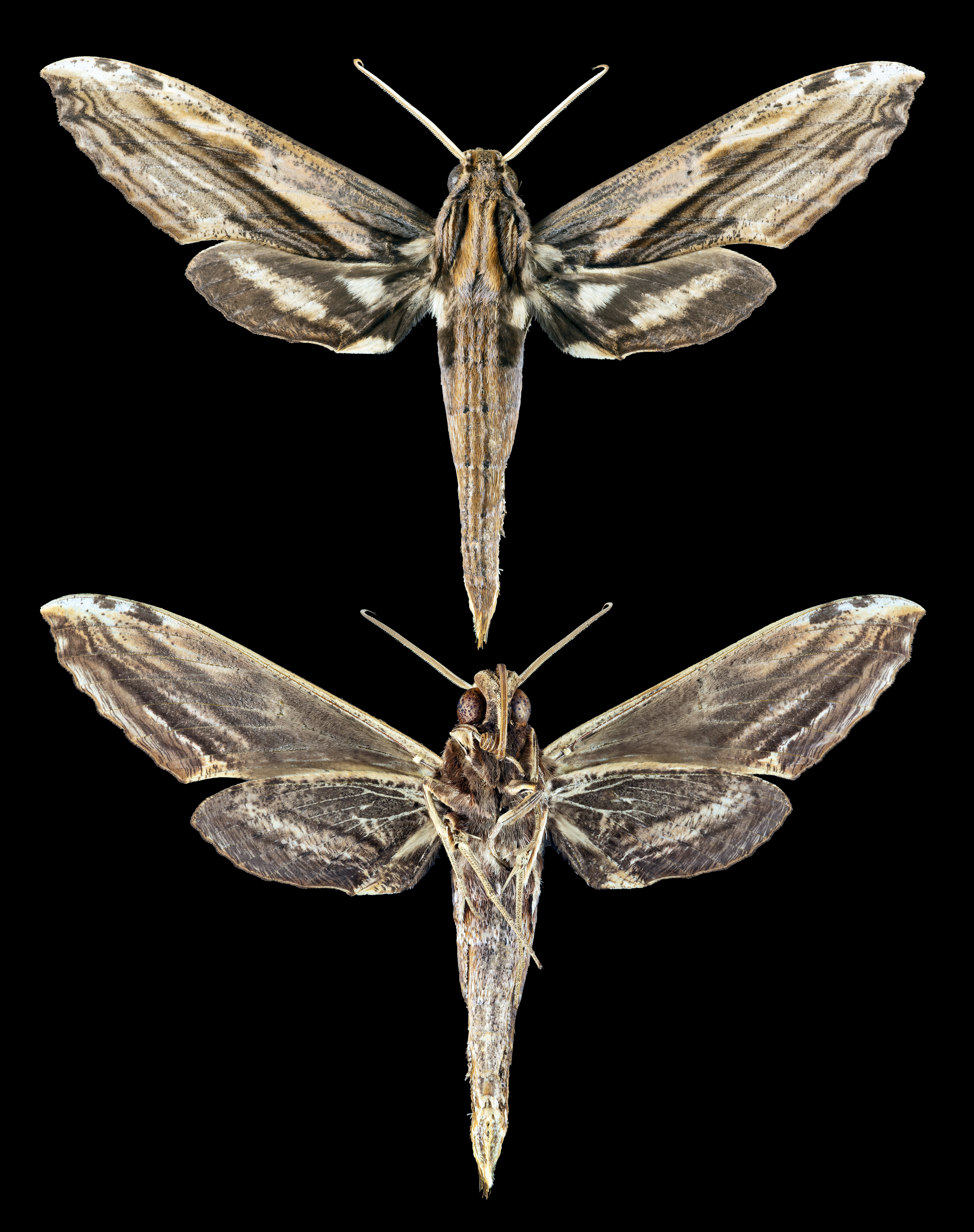
Xylophanes guianensis

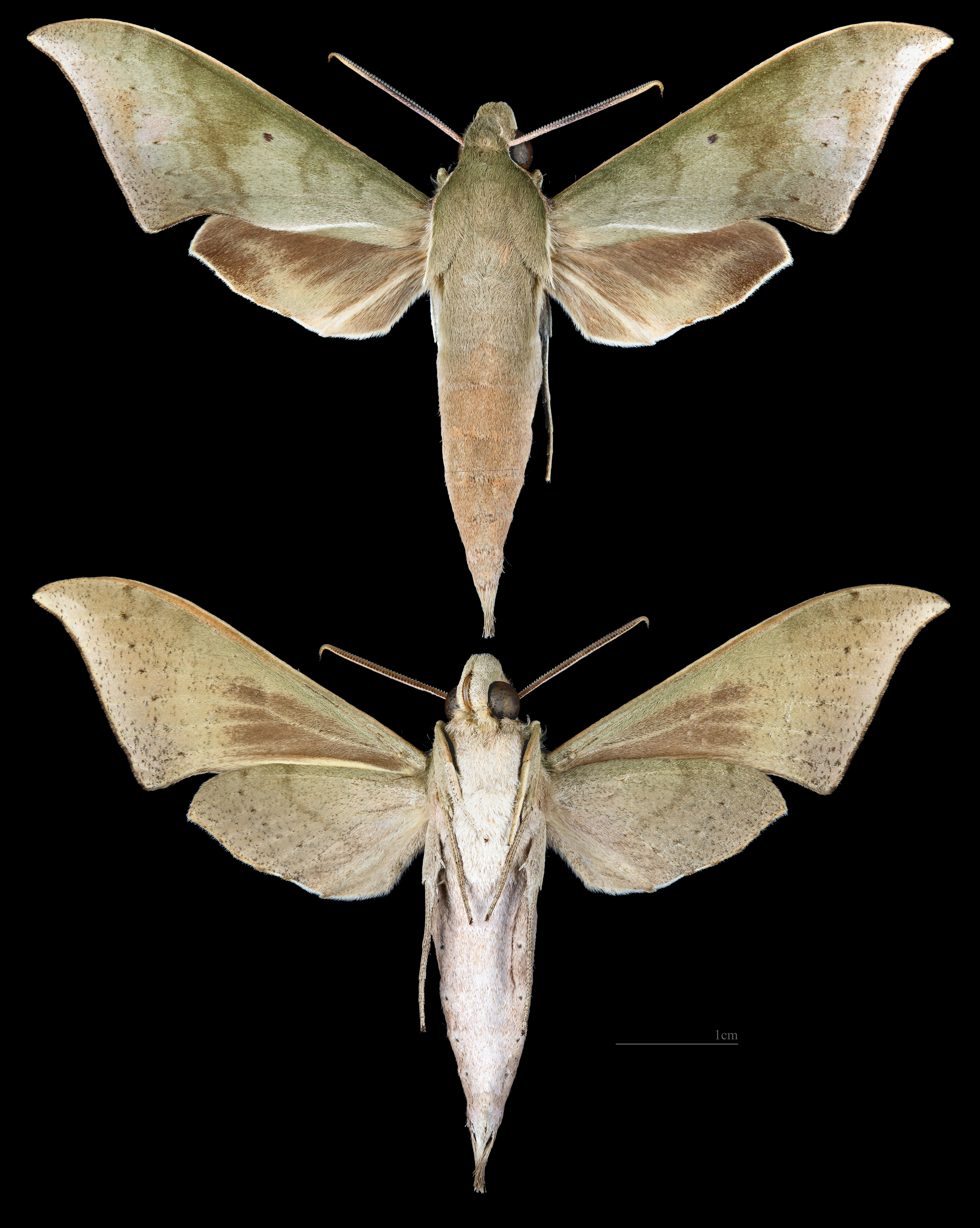
Xylophanes hannemanni

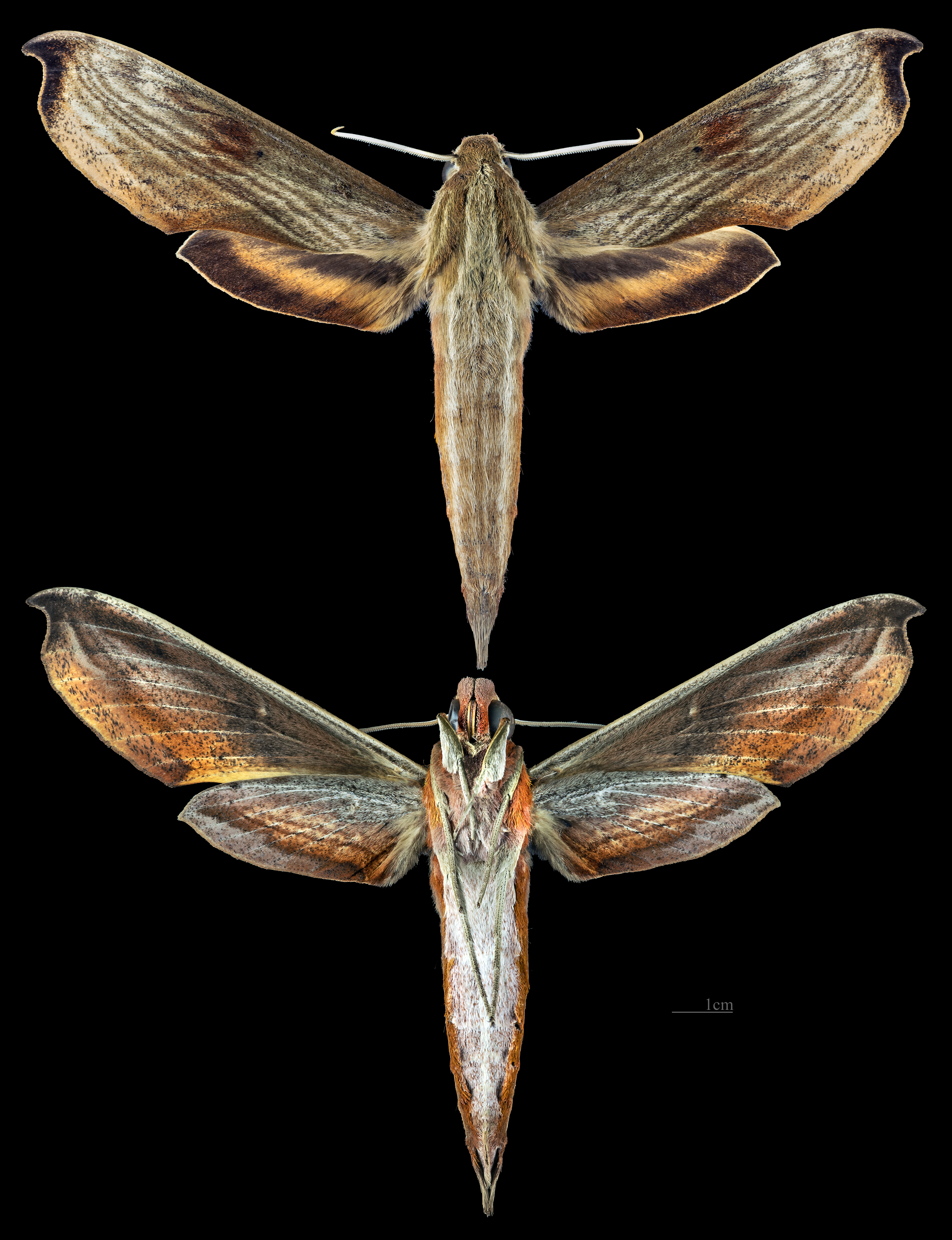
Xylophanes haxairei

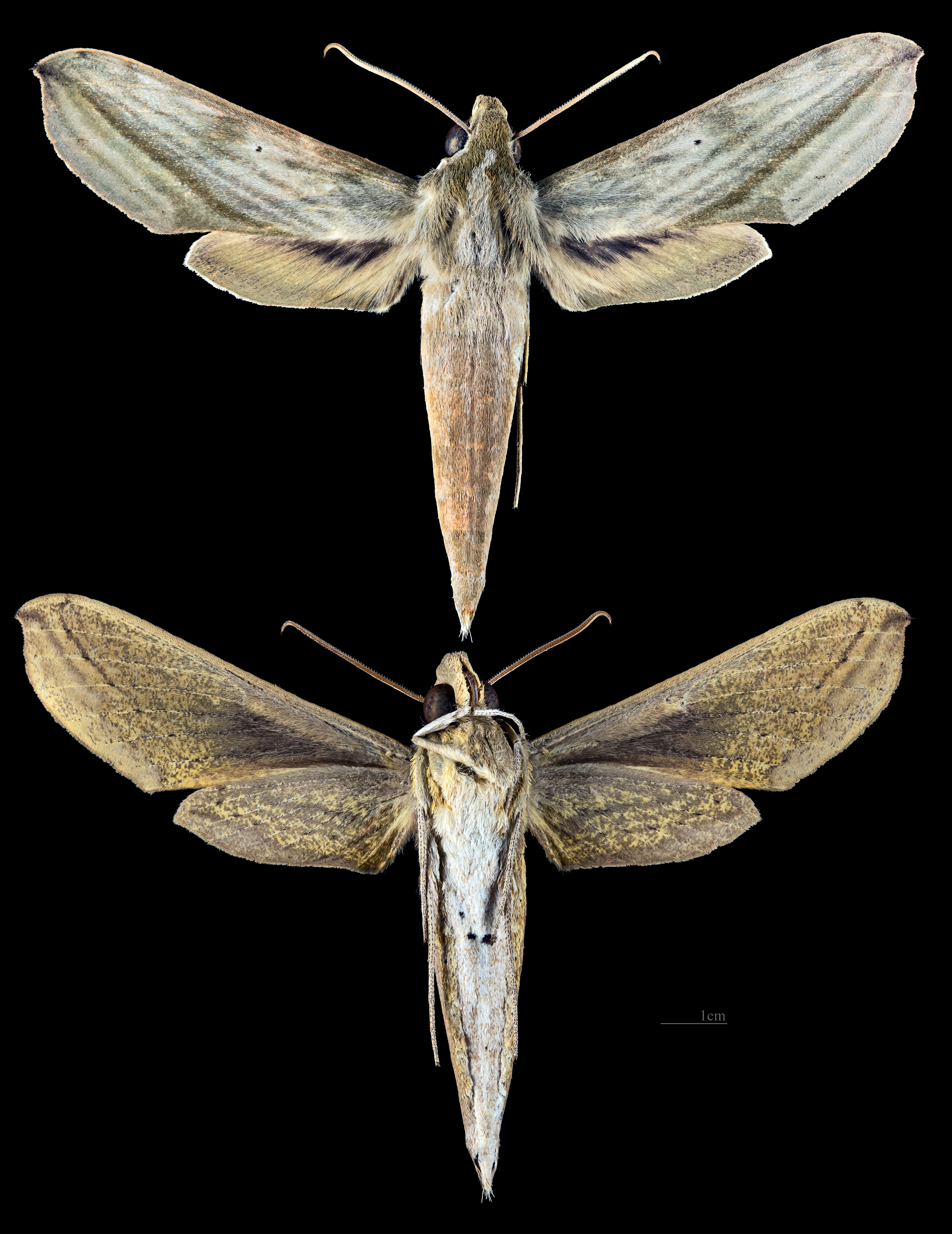
Xylophanes hydrata

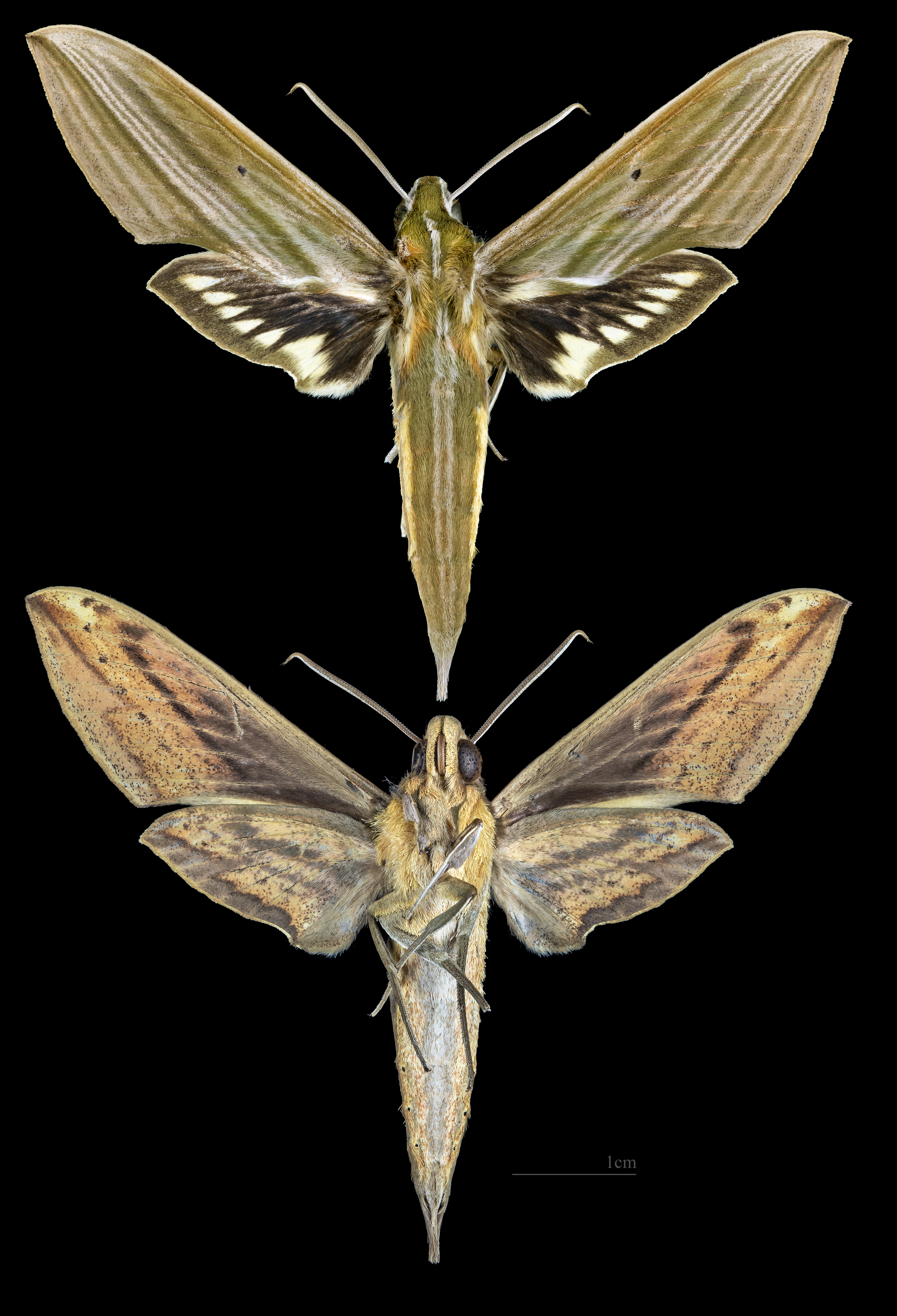
Xylophanes indistincta

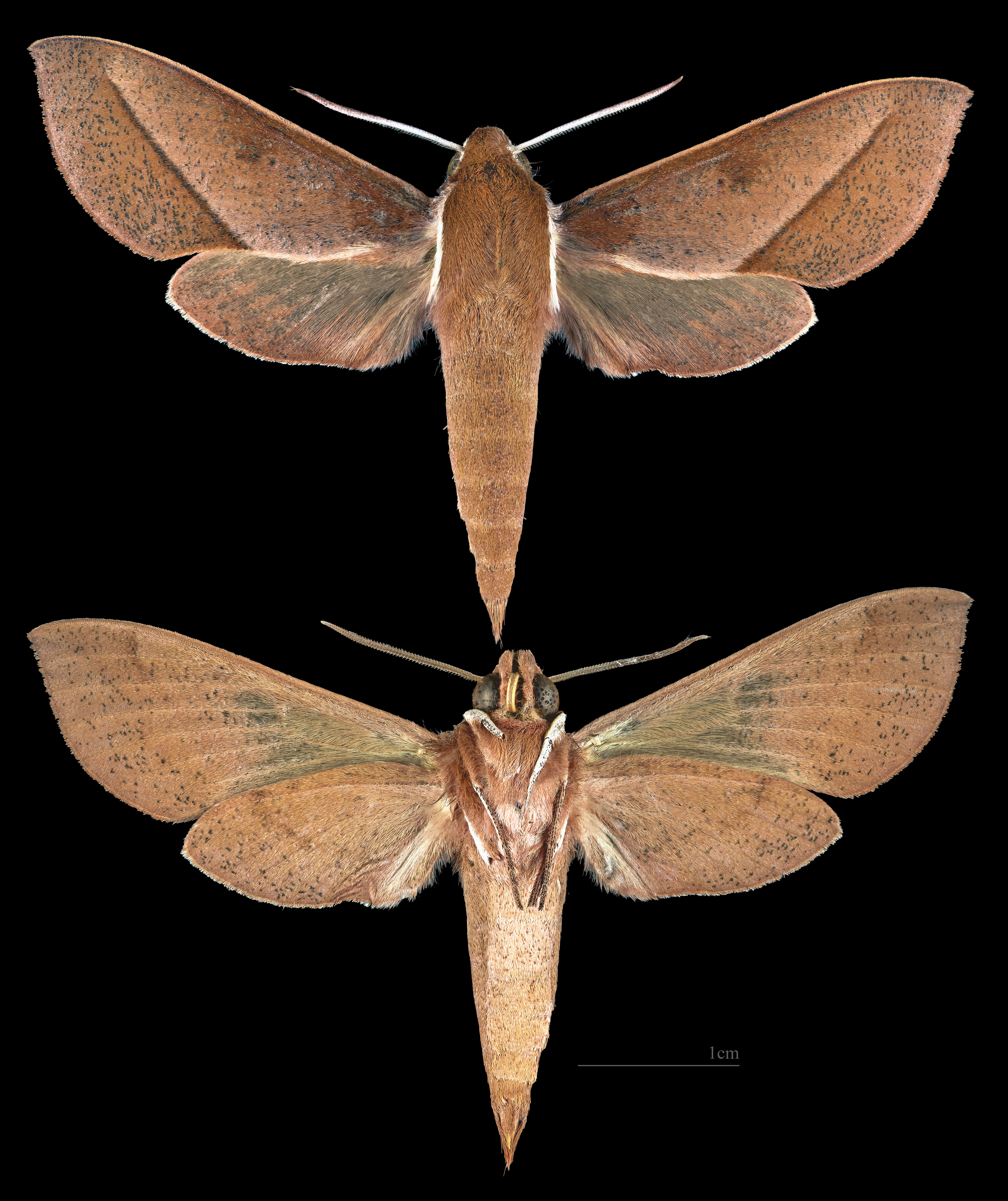
Xylophanes irrorata

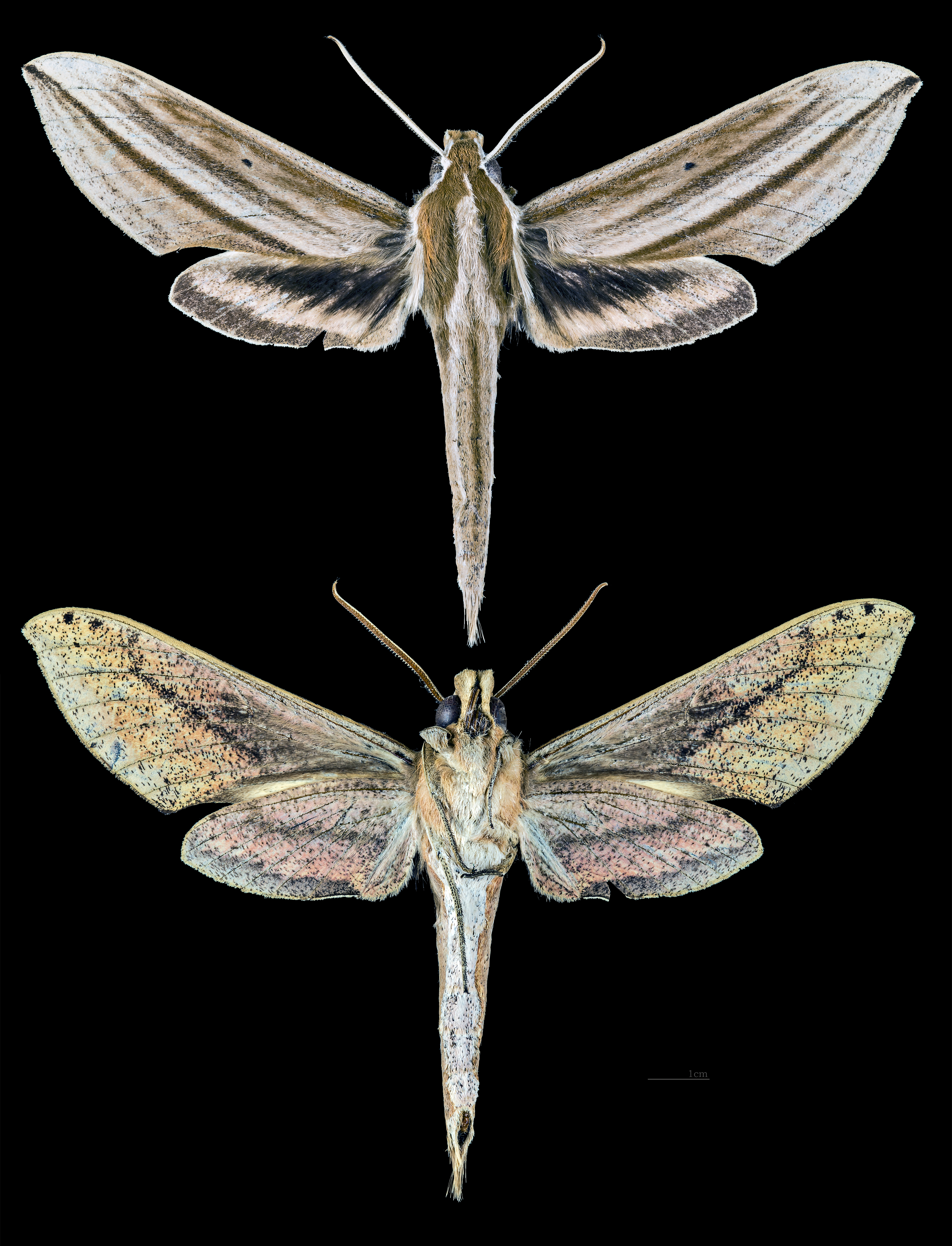
Xylophanes isaon

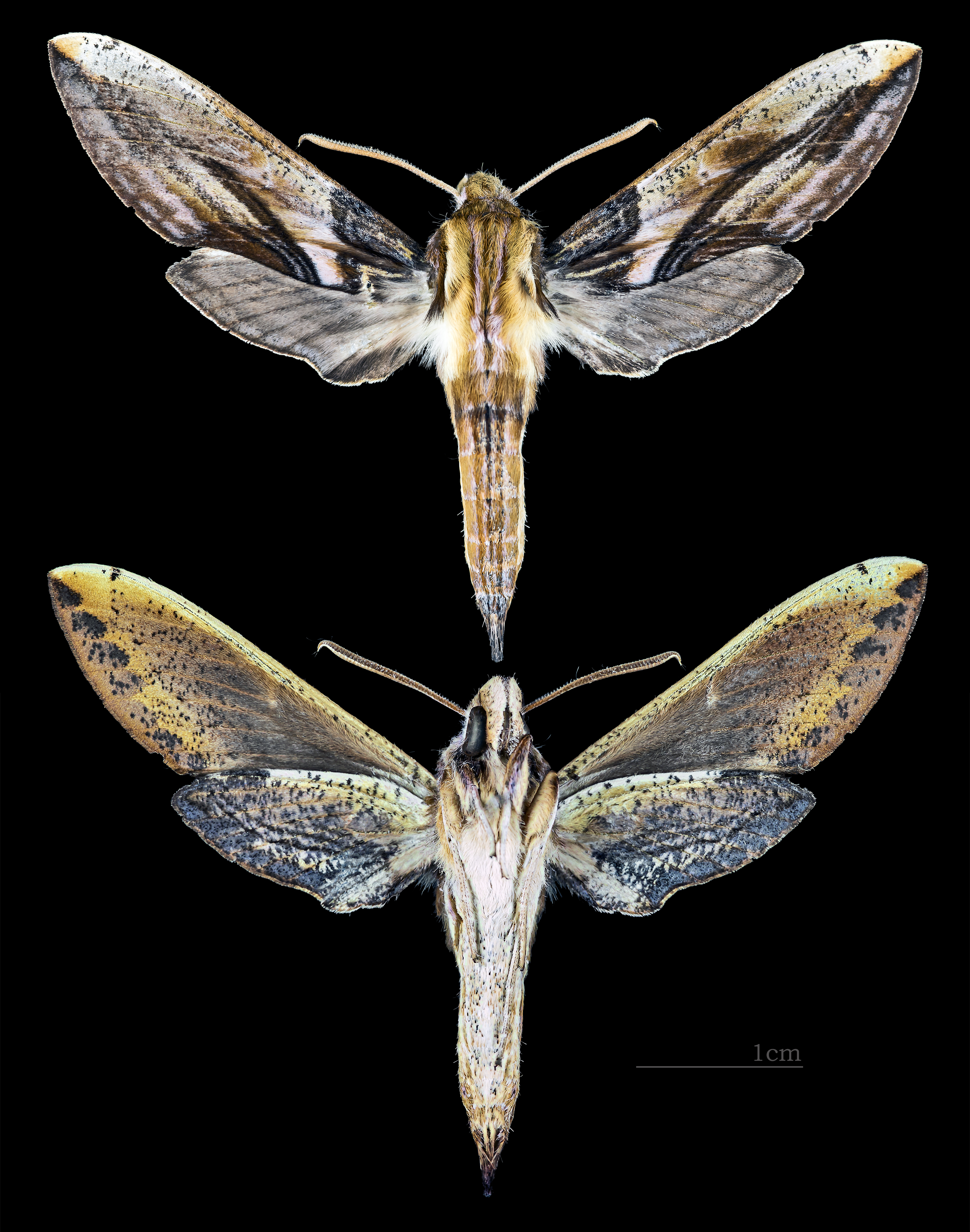
Xylophanes jordani

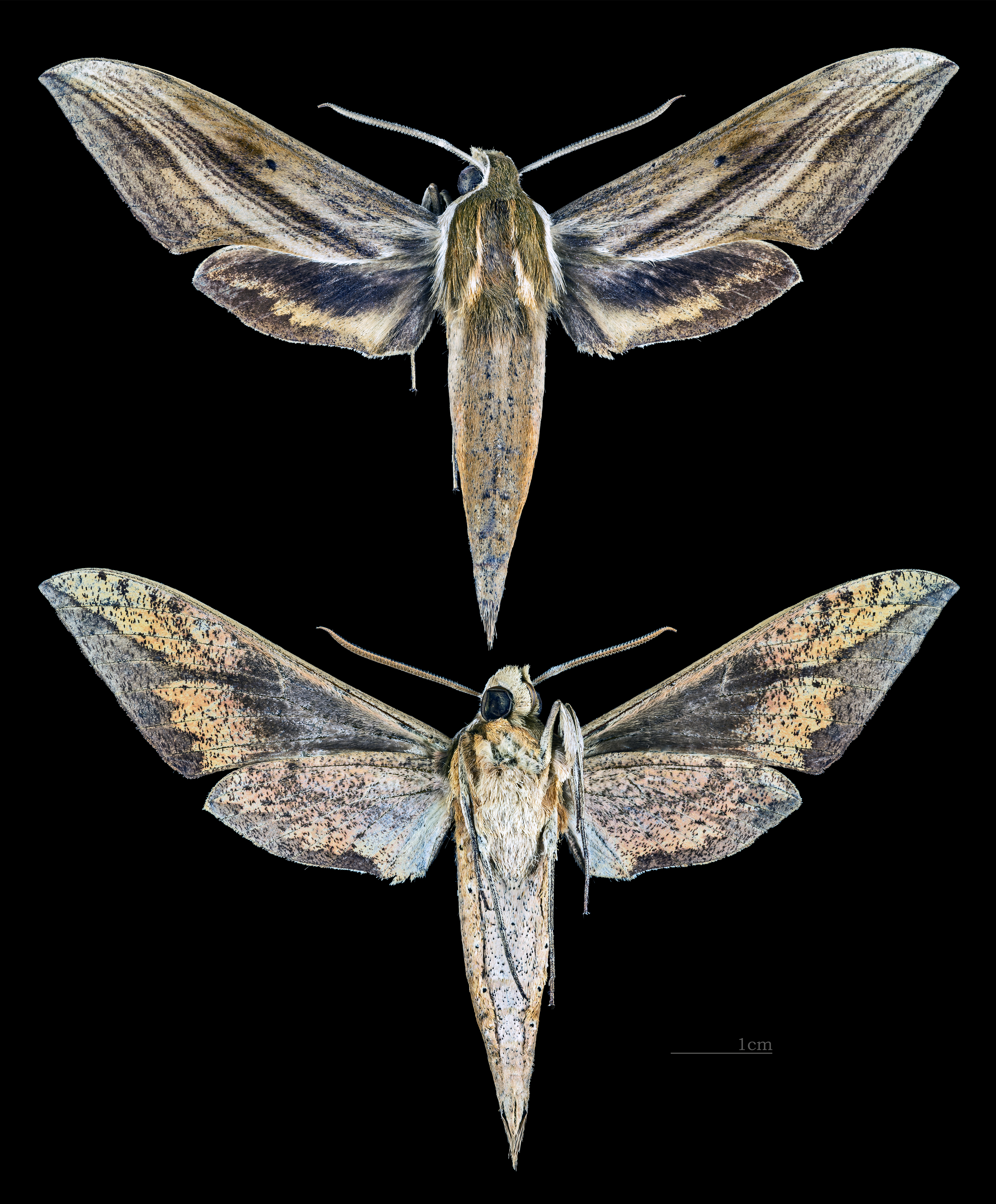
Xylophanes josephinae

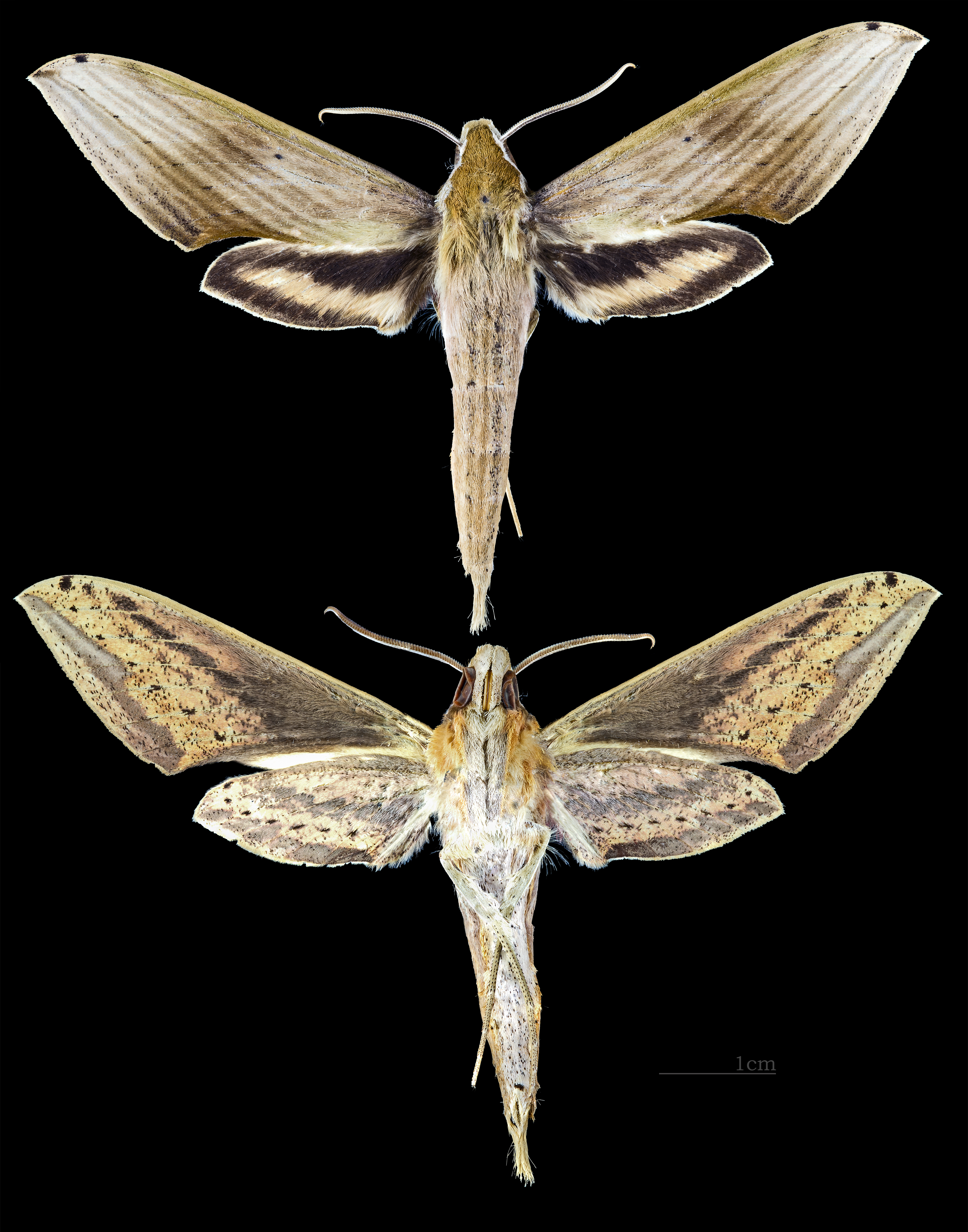
Xylophanes libya

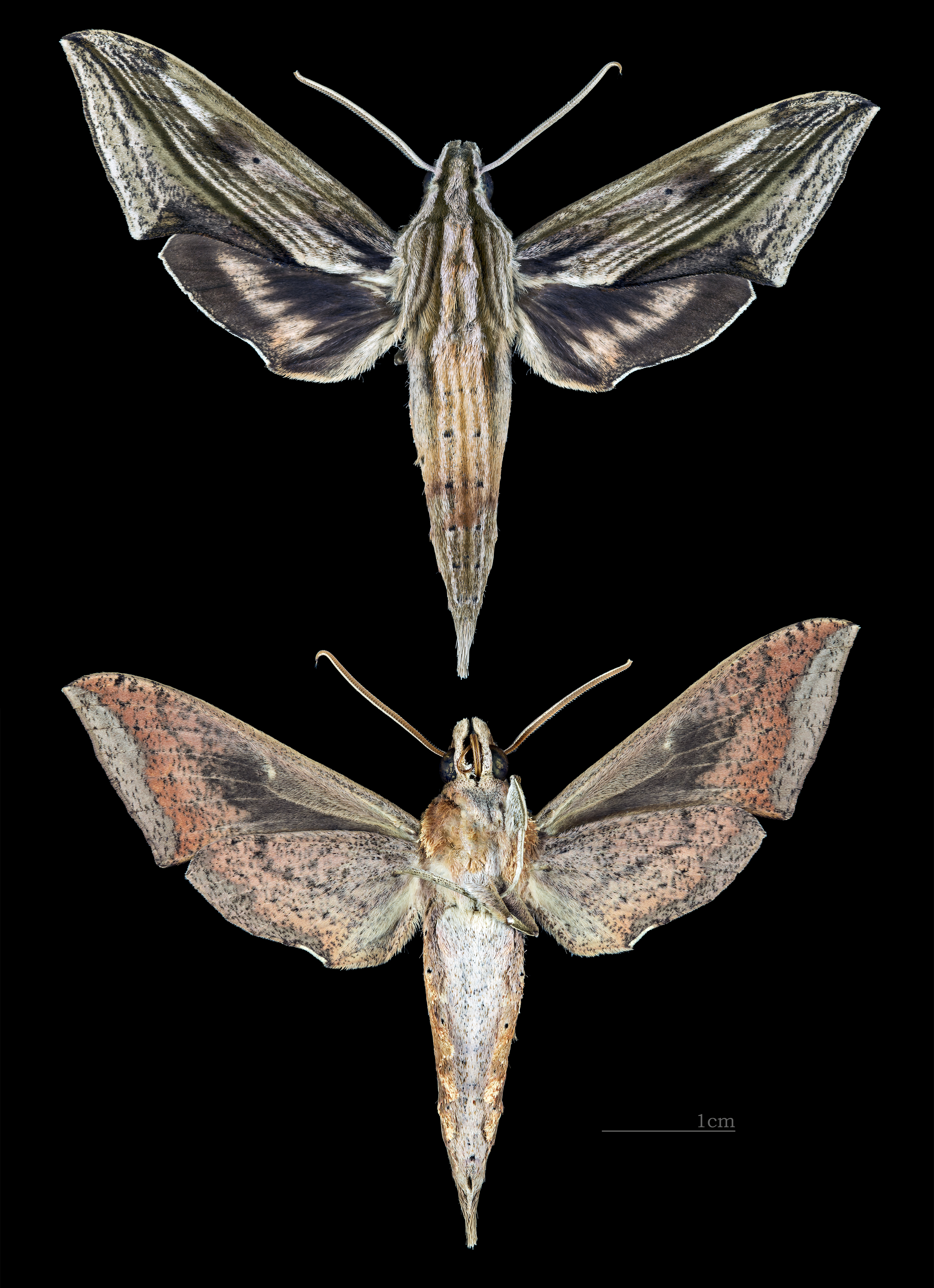
Xylophanes lichyi

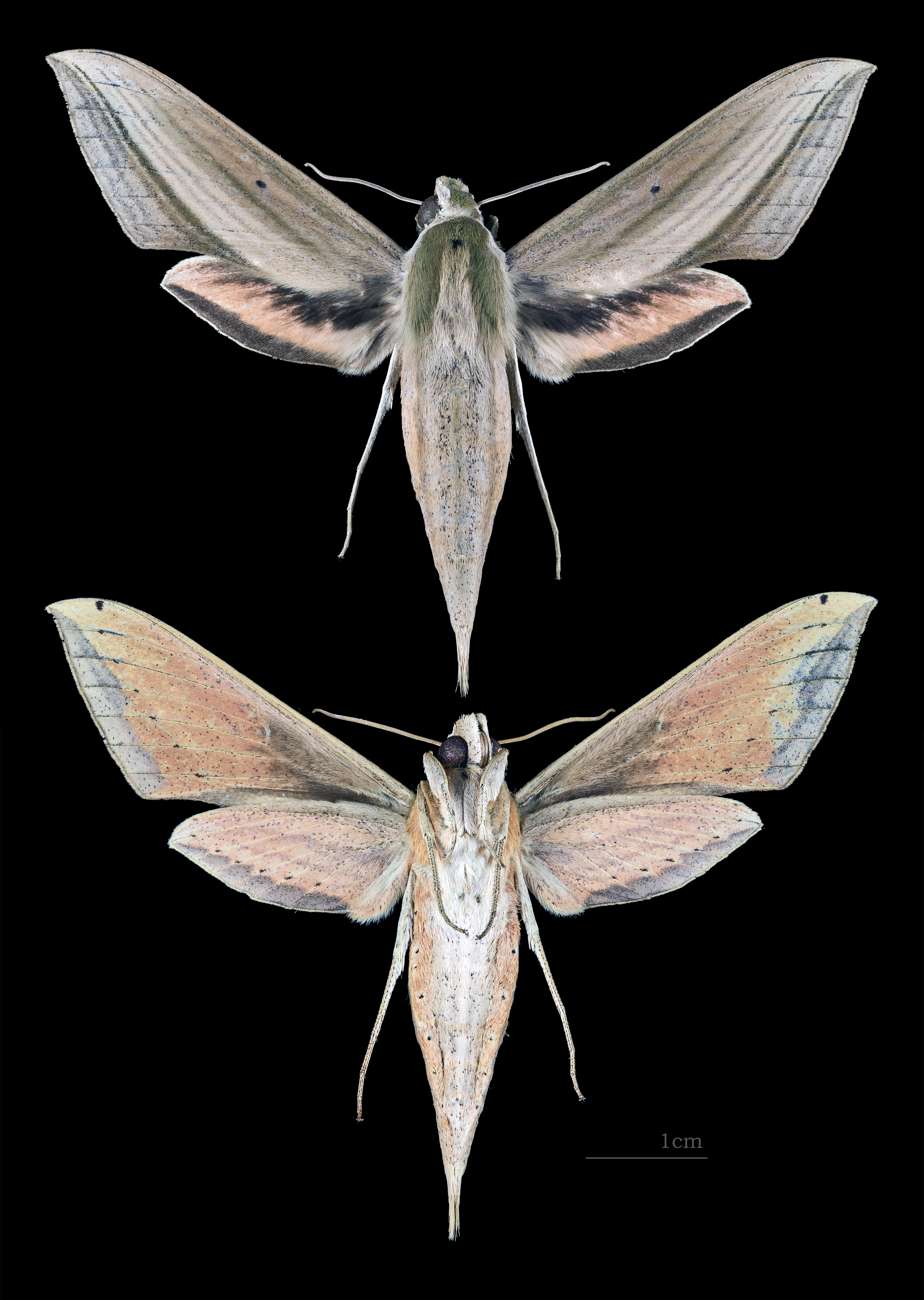
Xylophanes loelia

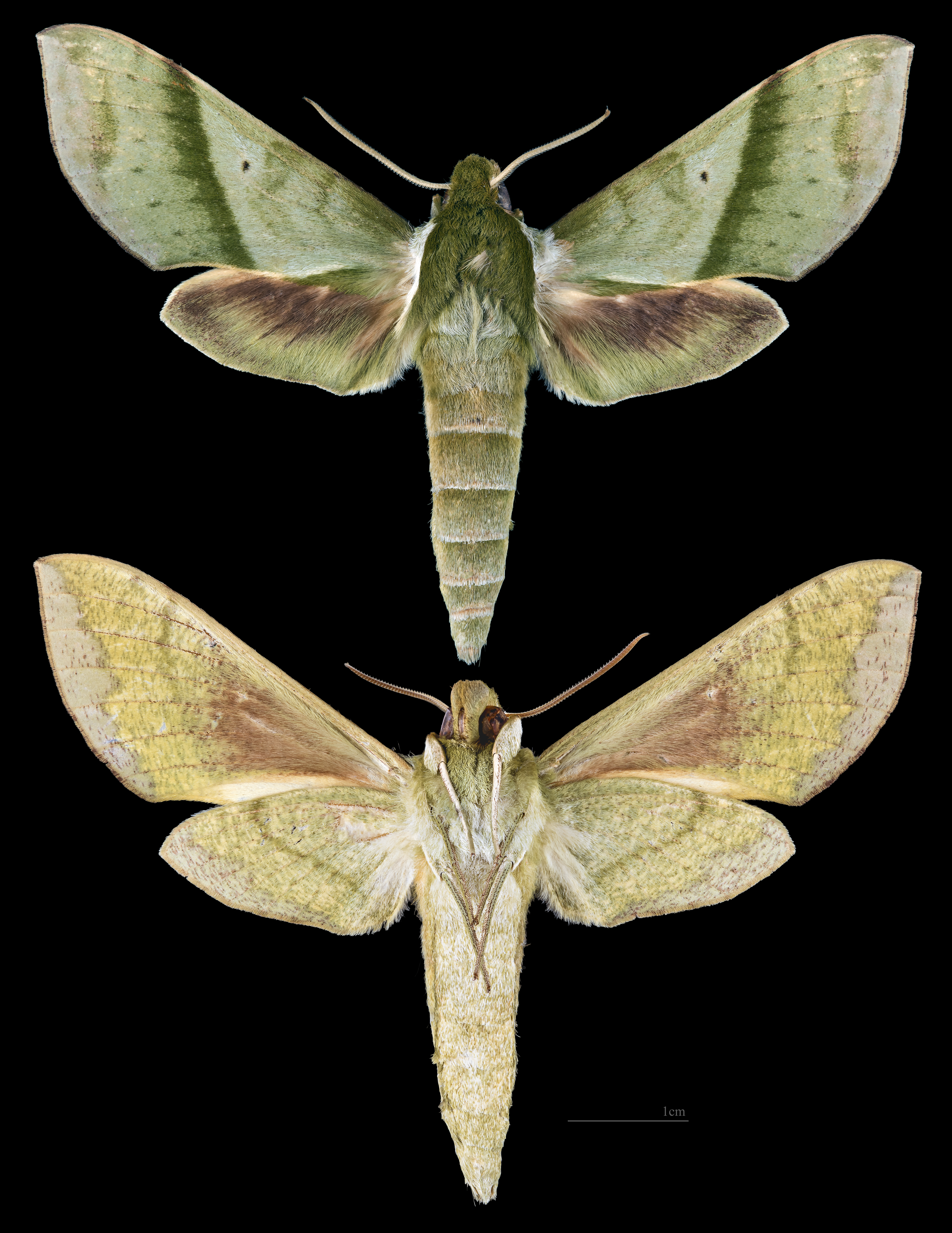
Xylophanes marginalis

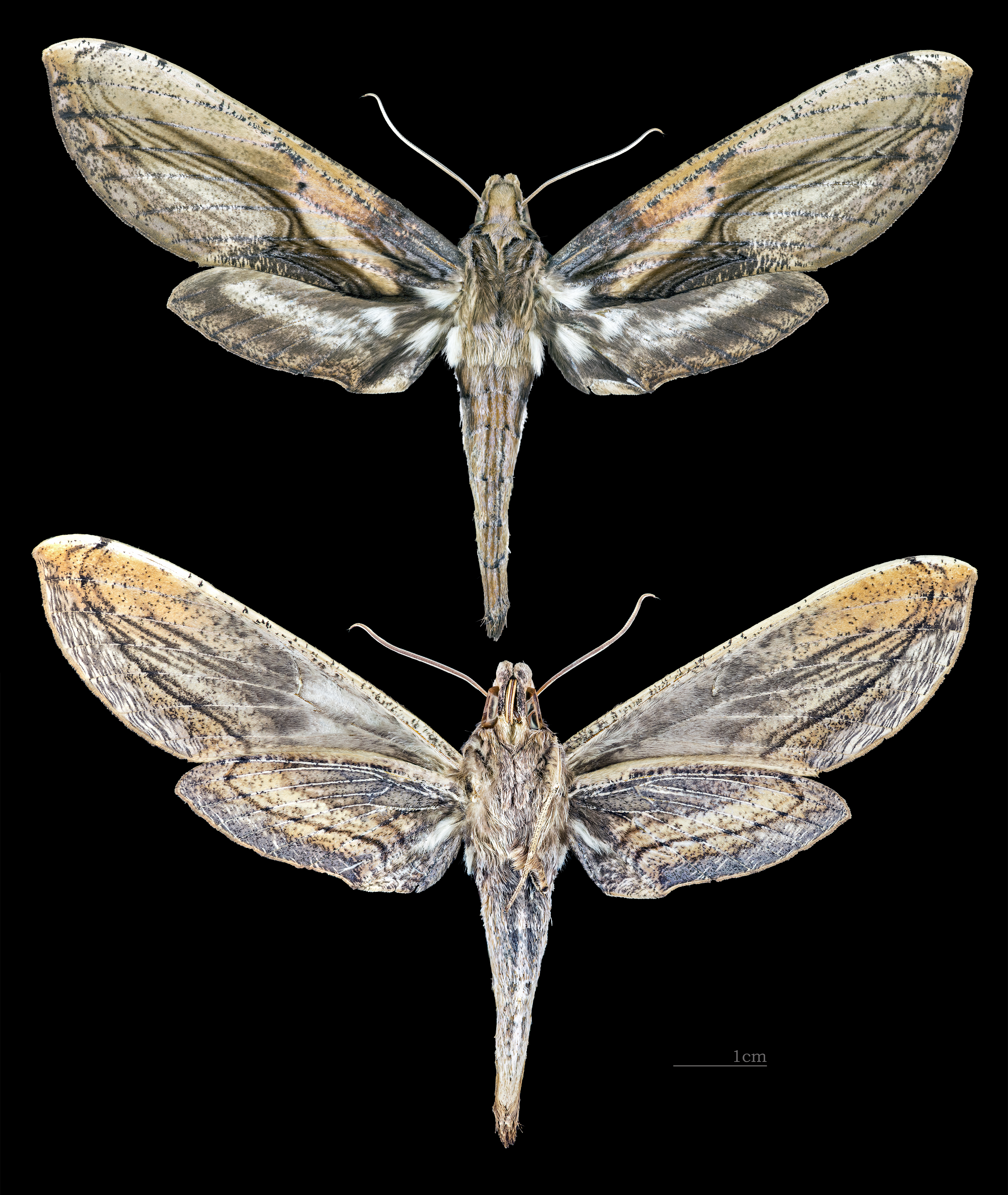
Xylophanes media

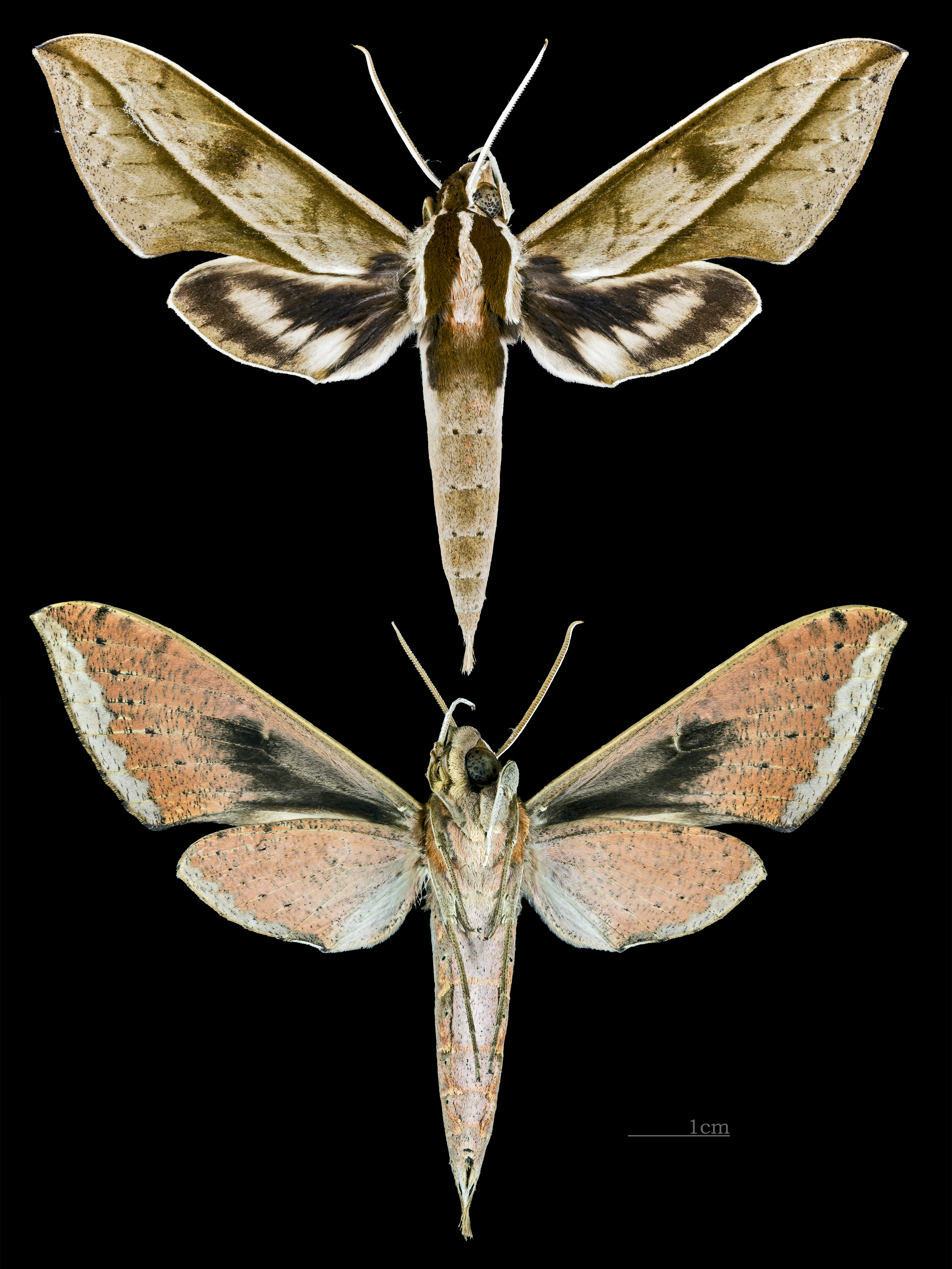
Xylophanes meridanus

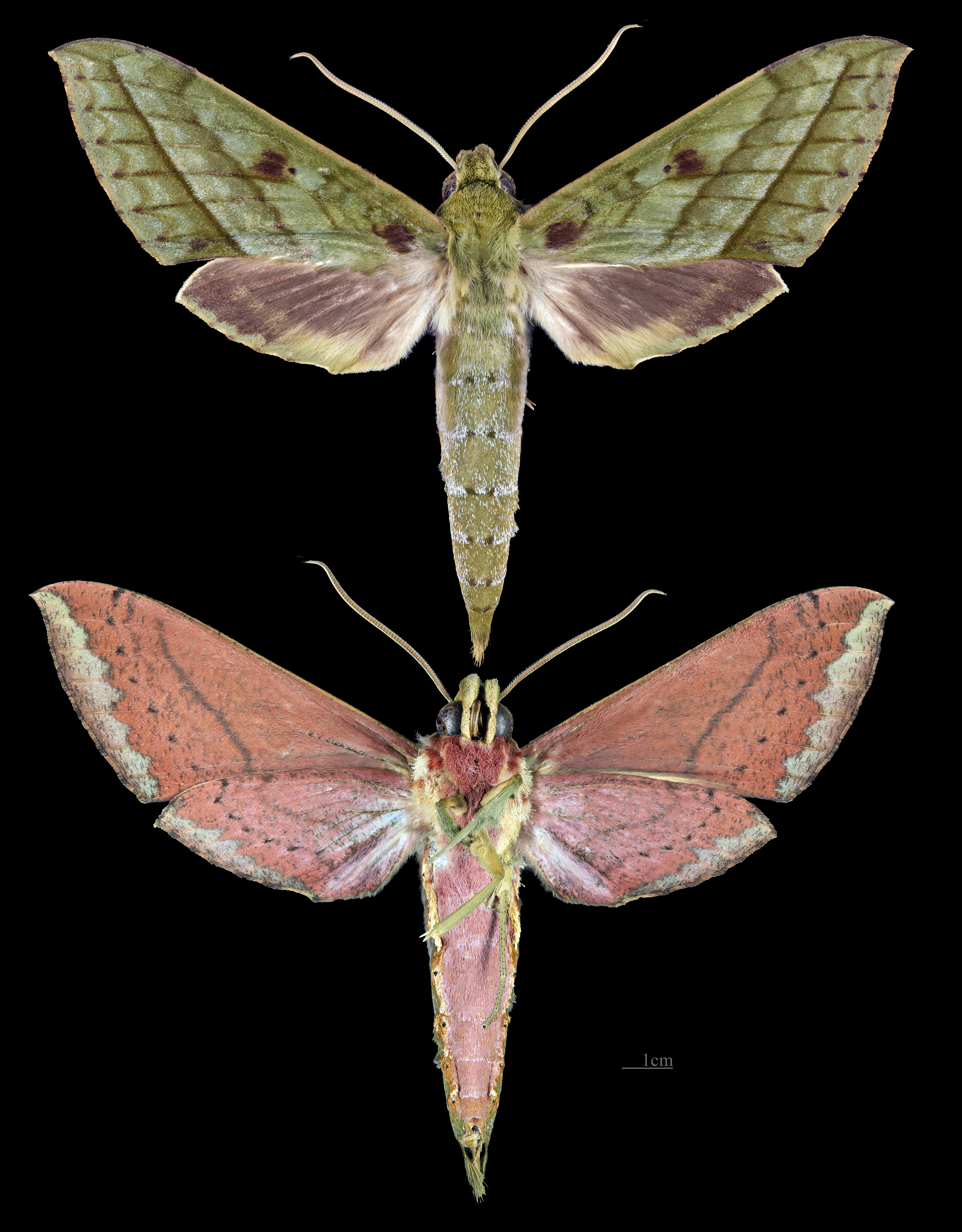
Xylophanes mirabilis

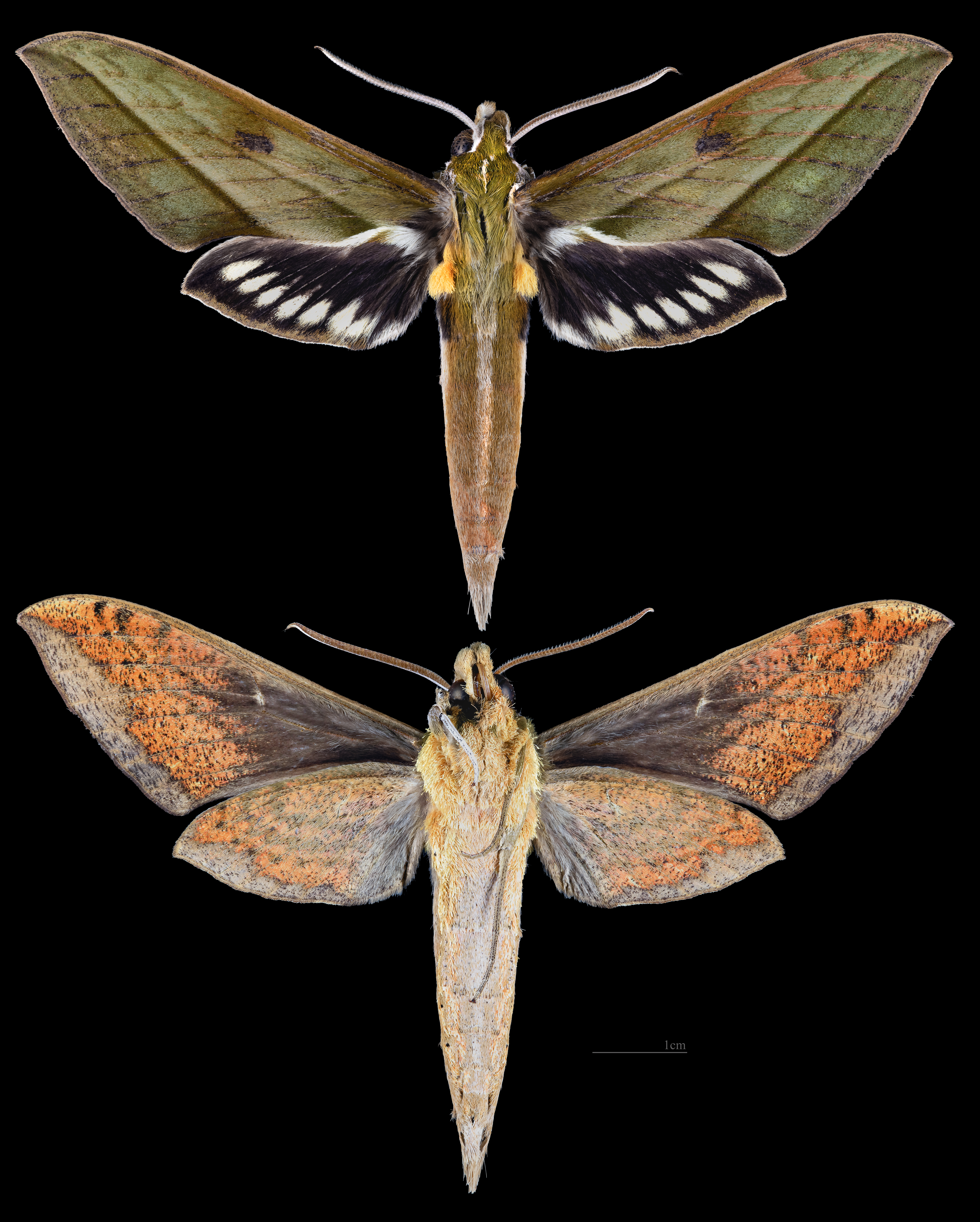
Xylophanes nabuchodonosor

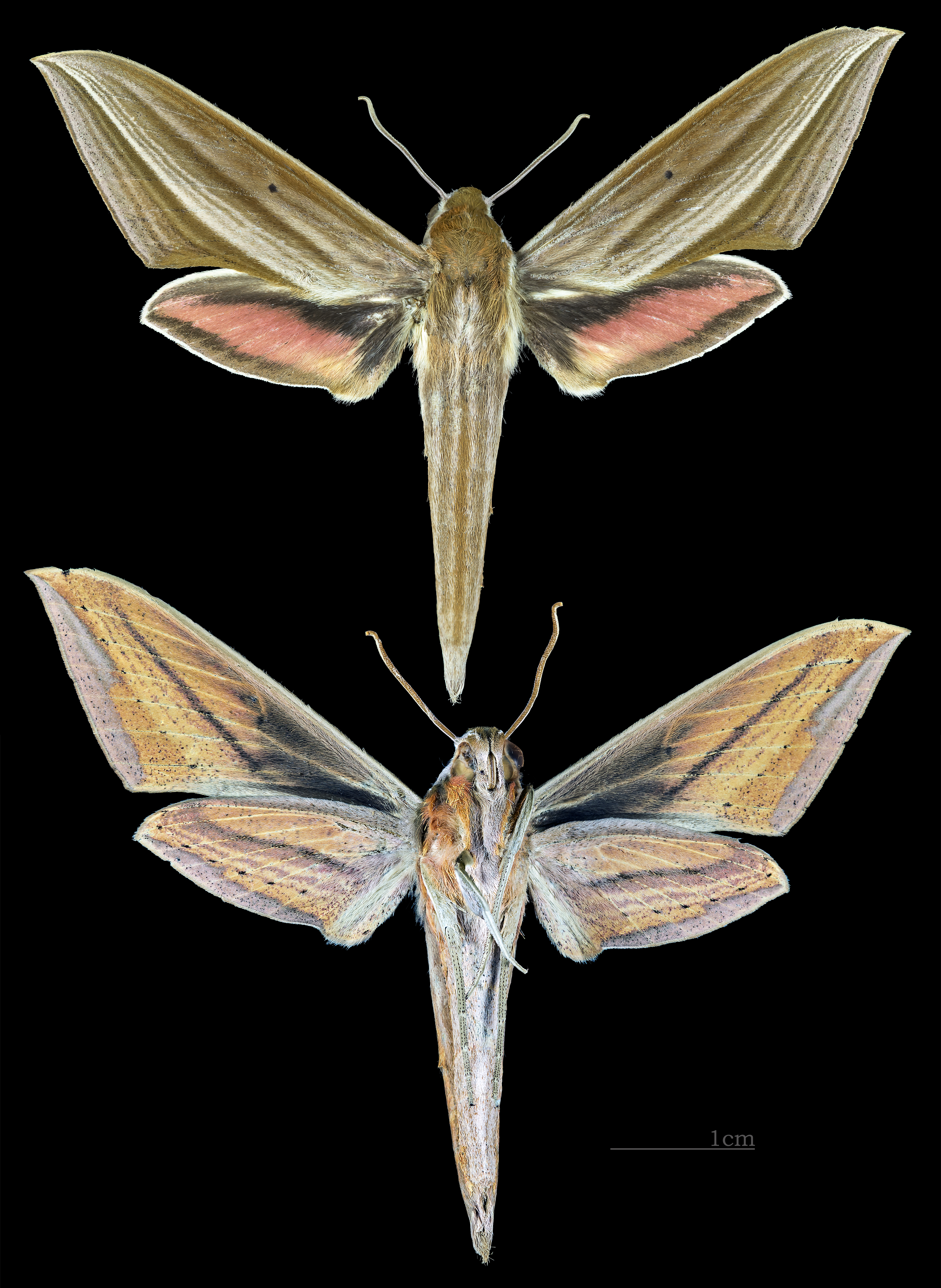
Xylophanes neoptolemus

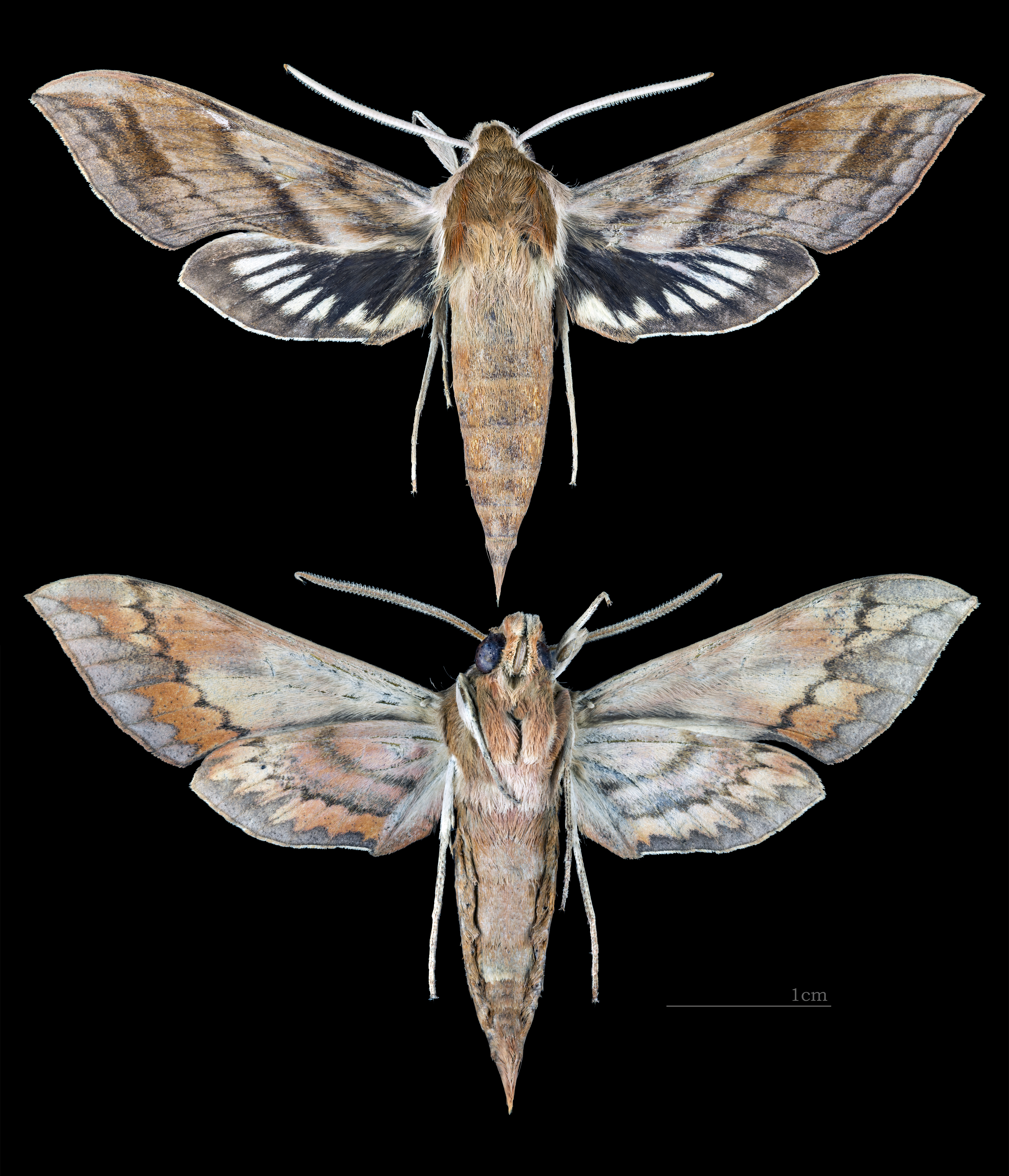
Xylophanes norfolki

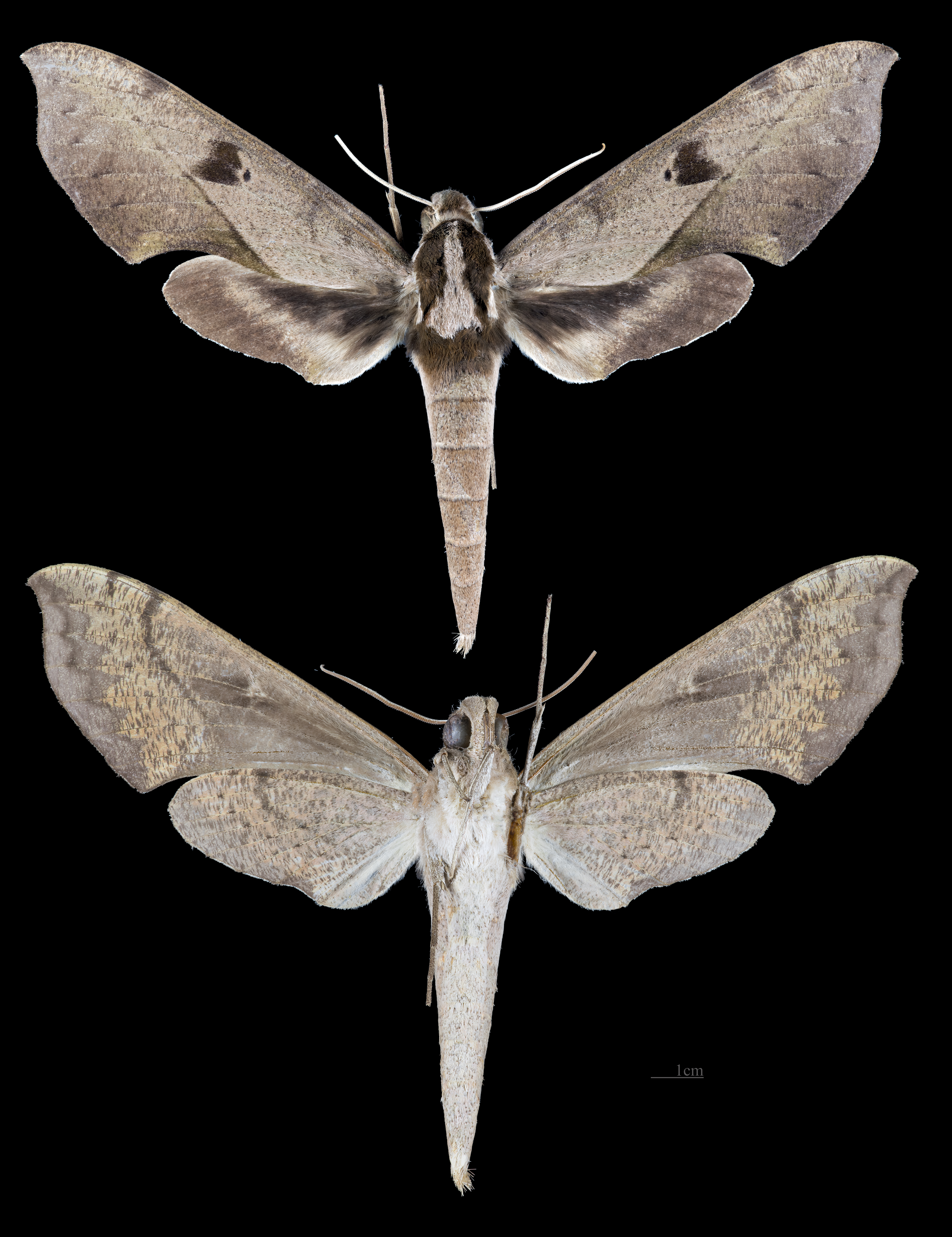
Xylophanes obscurus

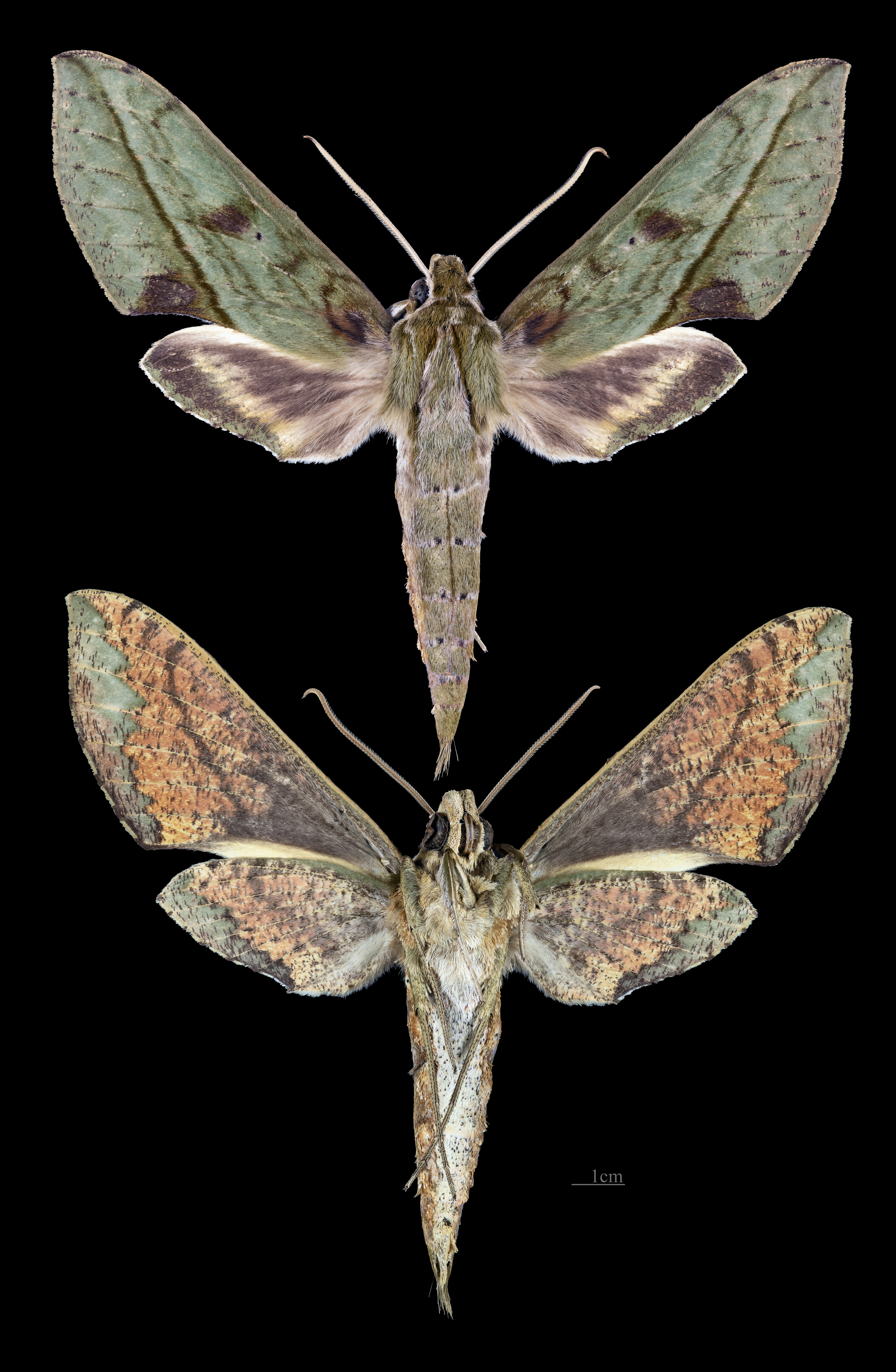
Xylophanes ockendeni

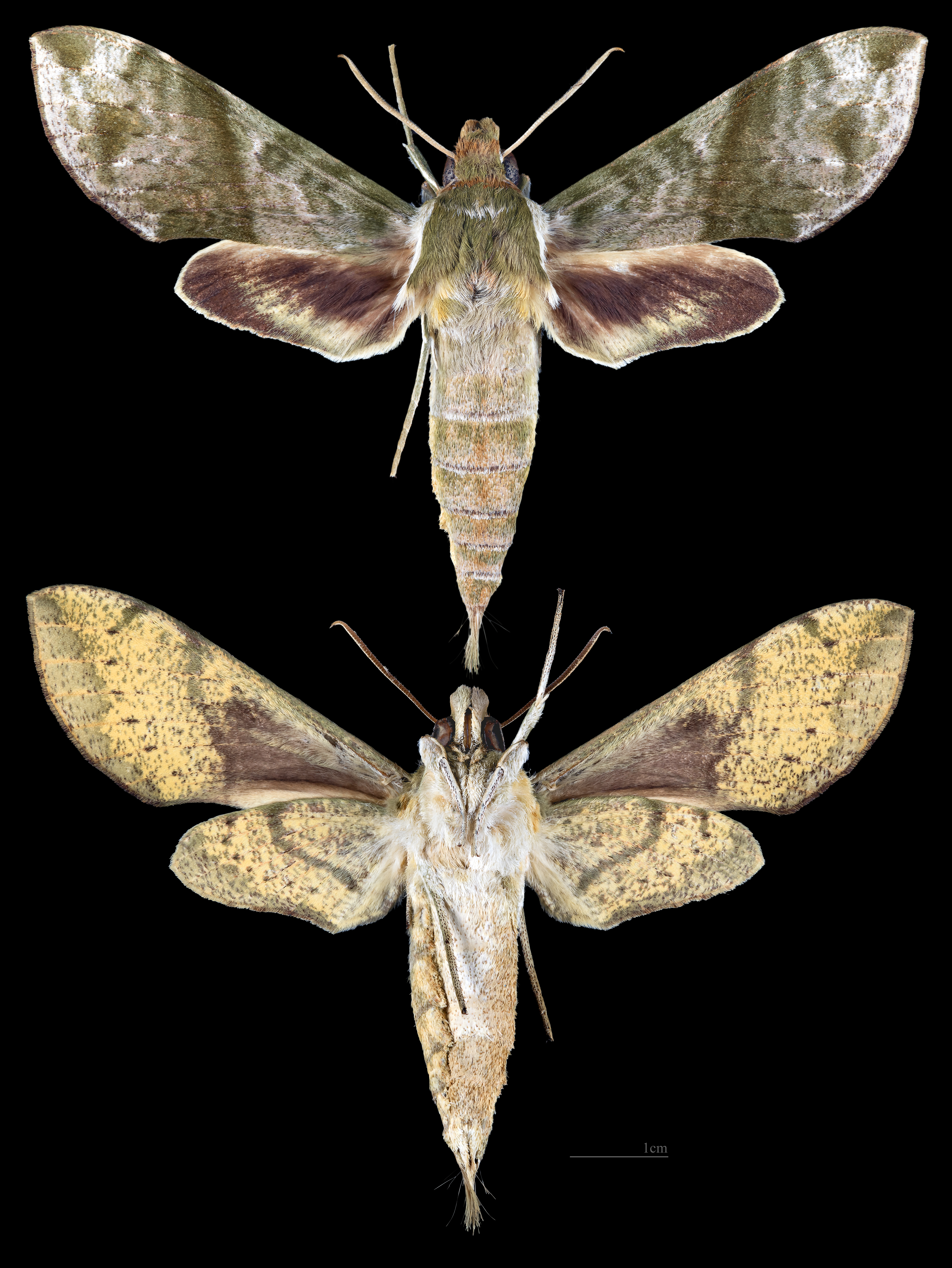
Xylophanes pistacina

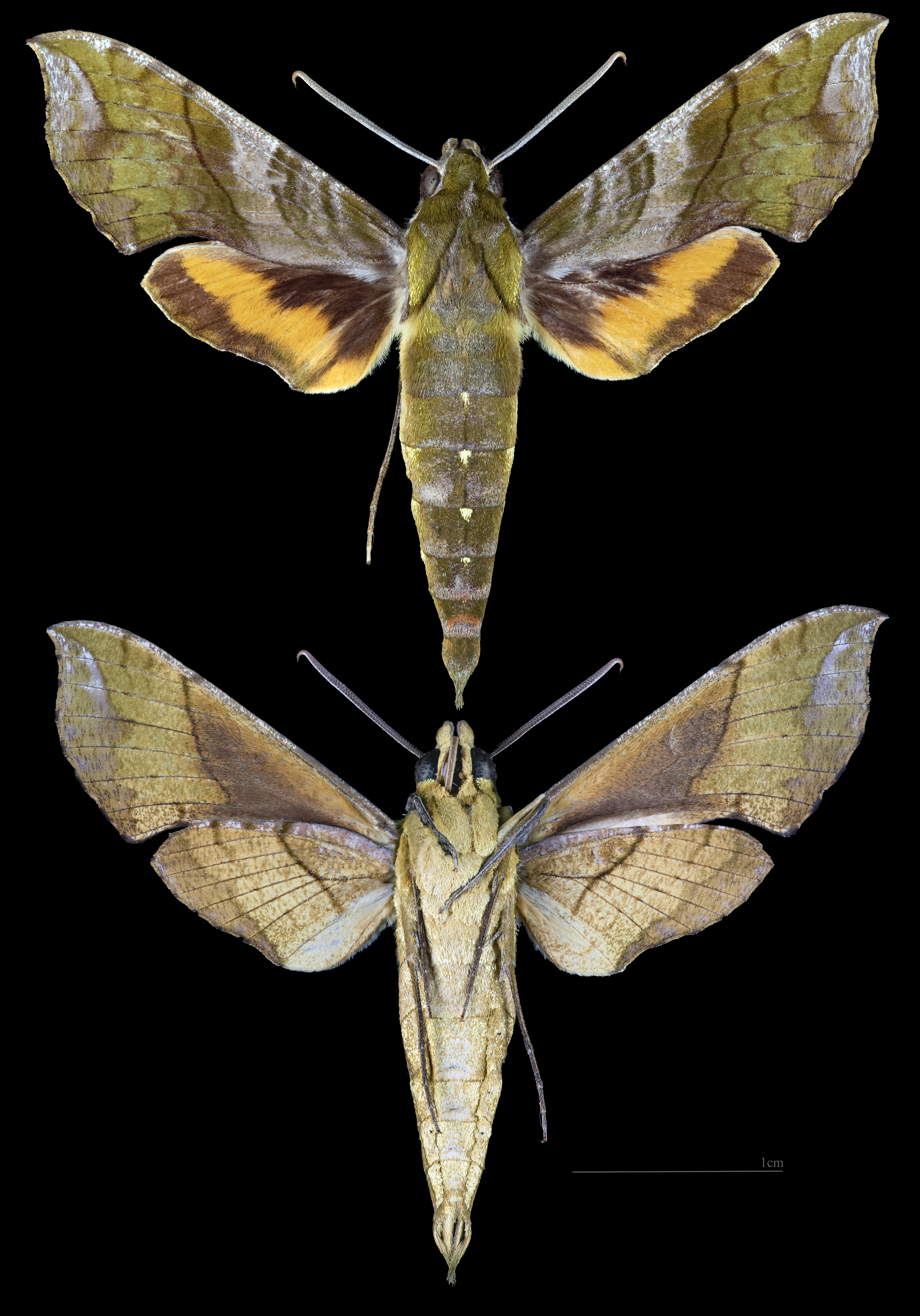
Xylophanes pluto

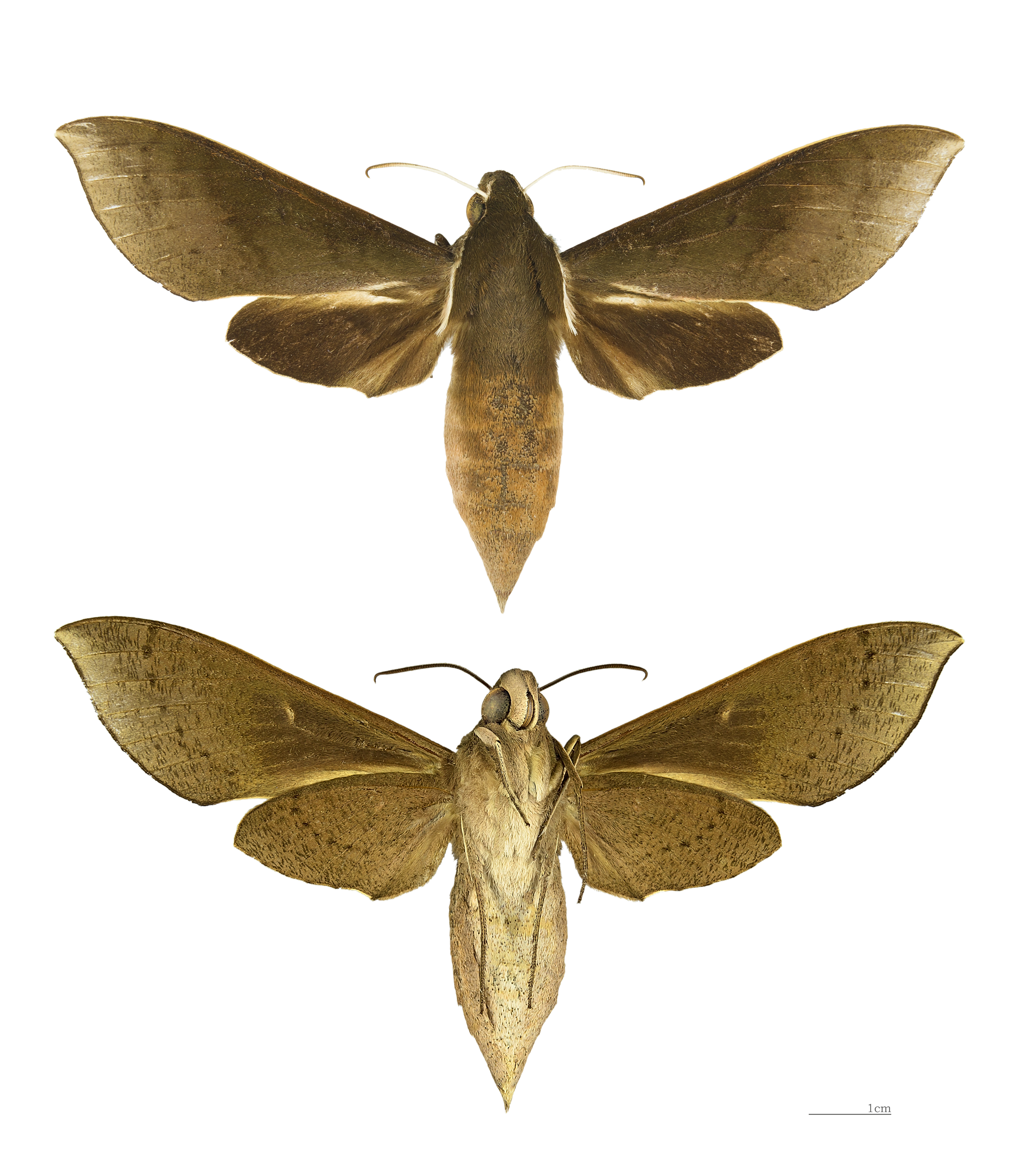
Xylophanes porcus

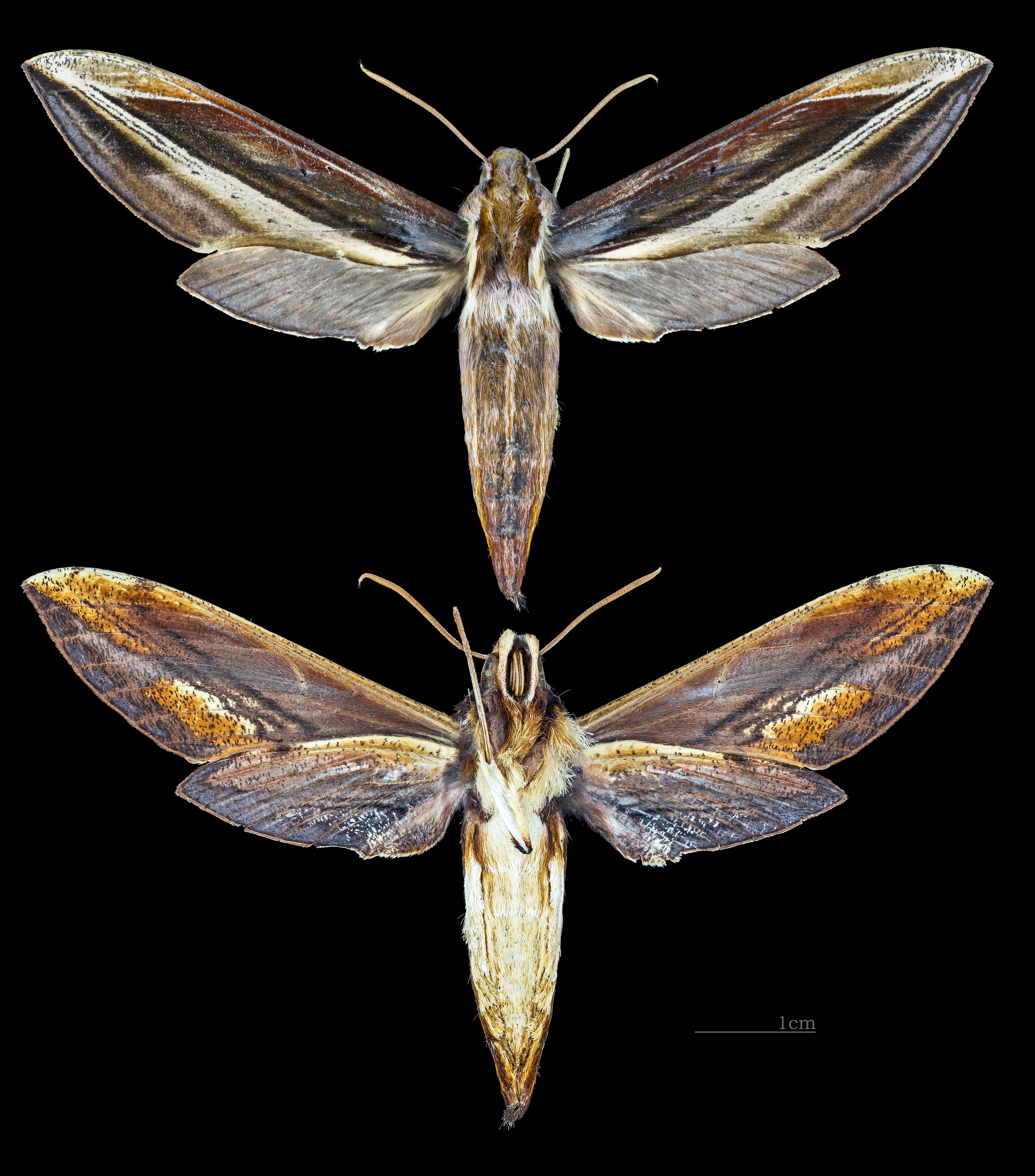
Xylophanes pyrrhus

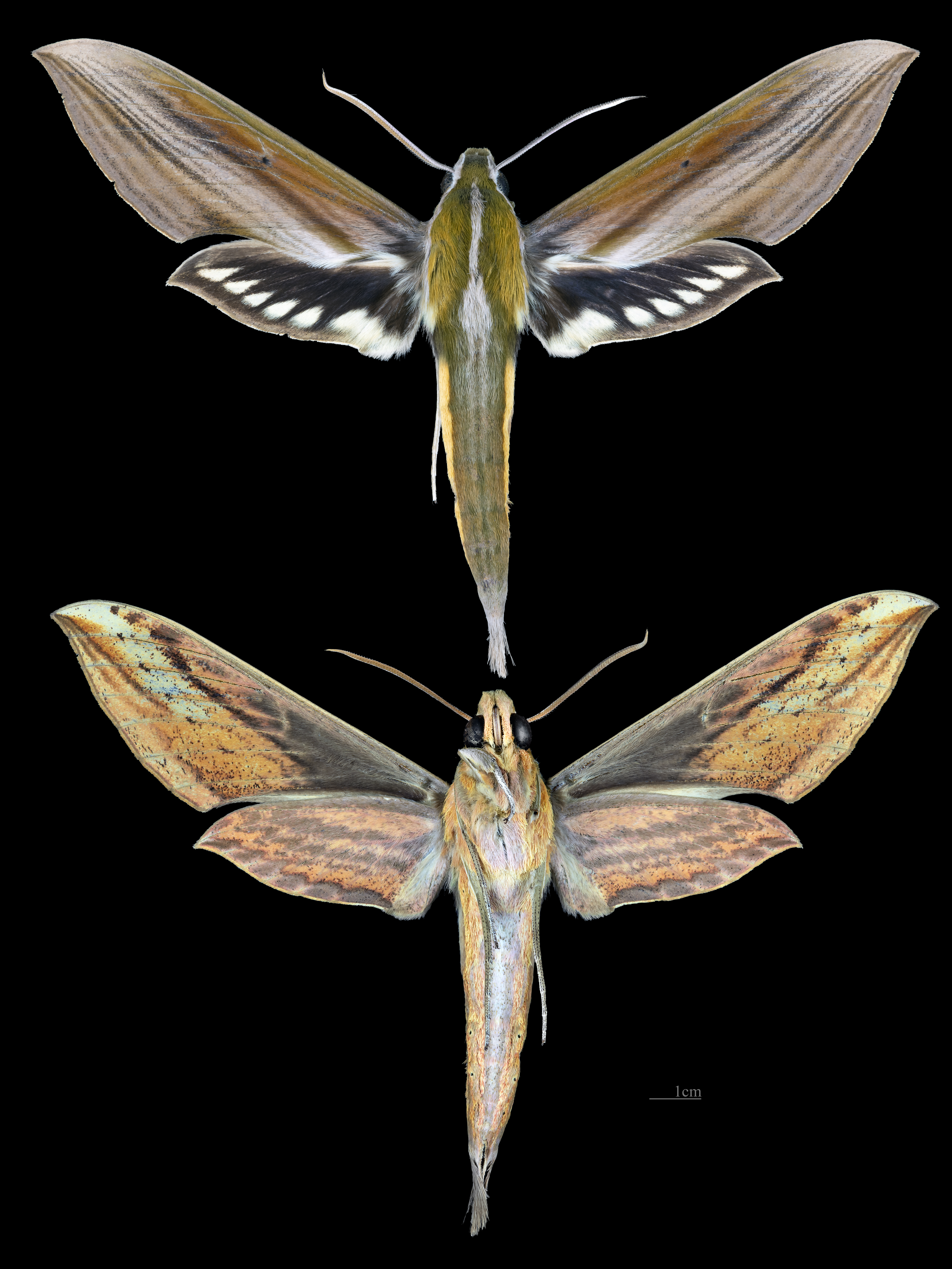
Xylophanes resta

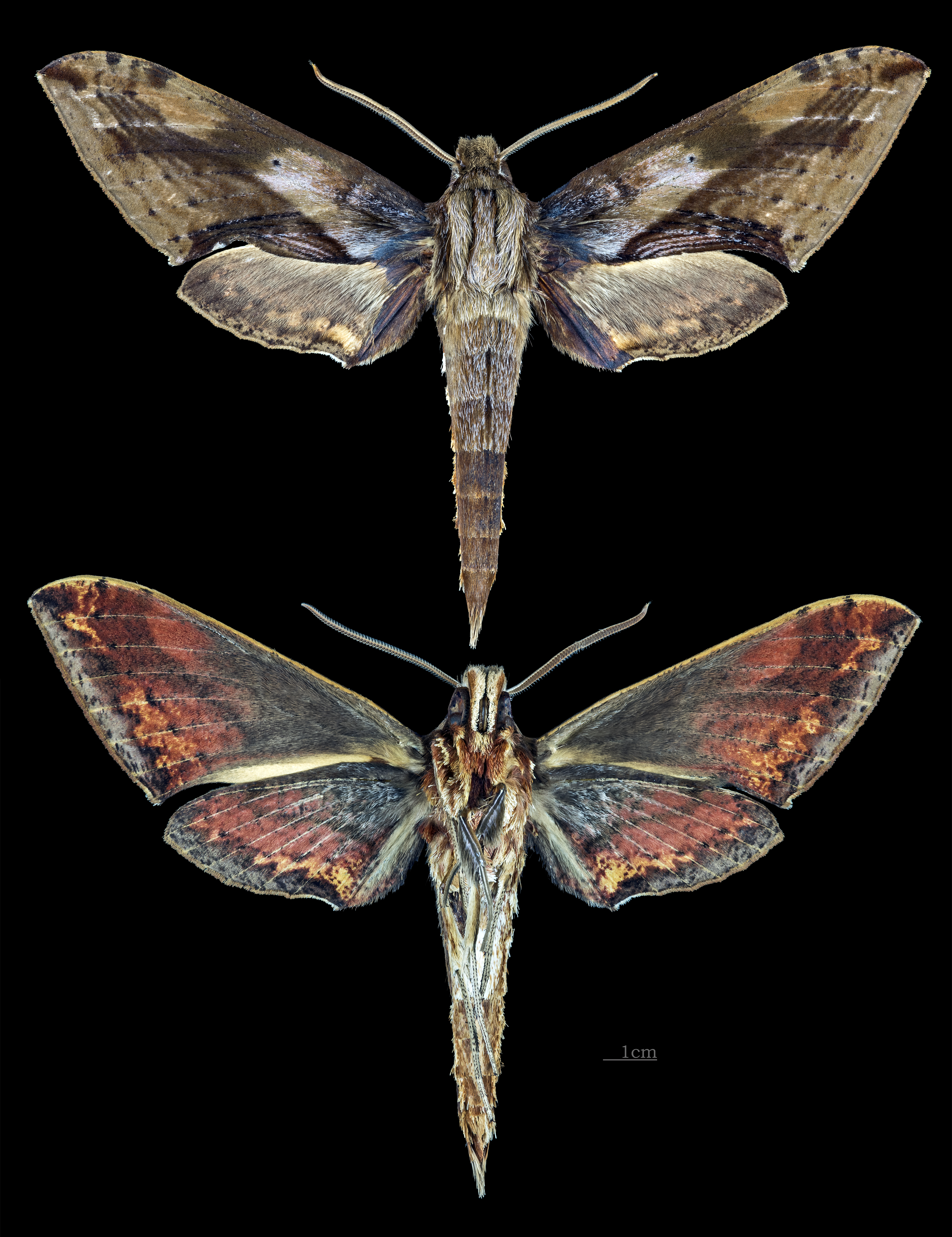
Xylophanes rhodina

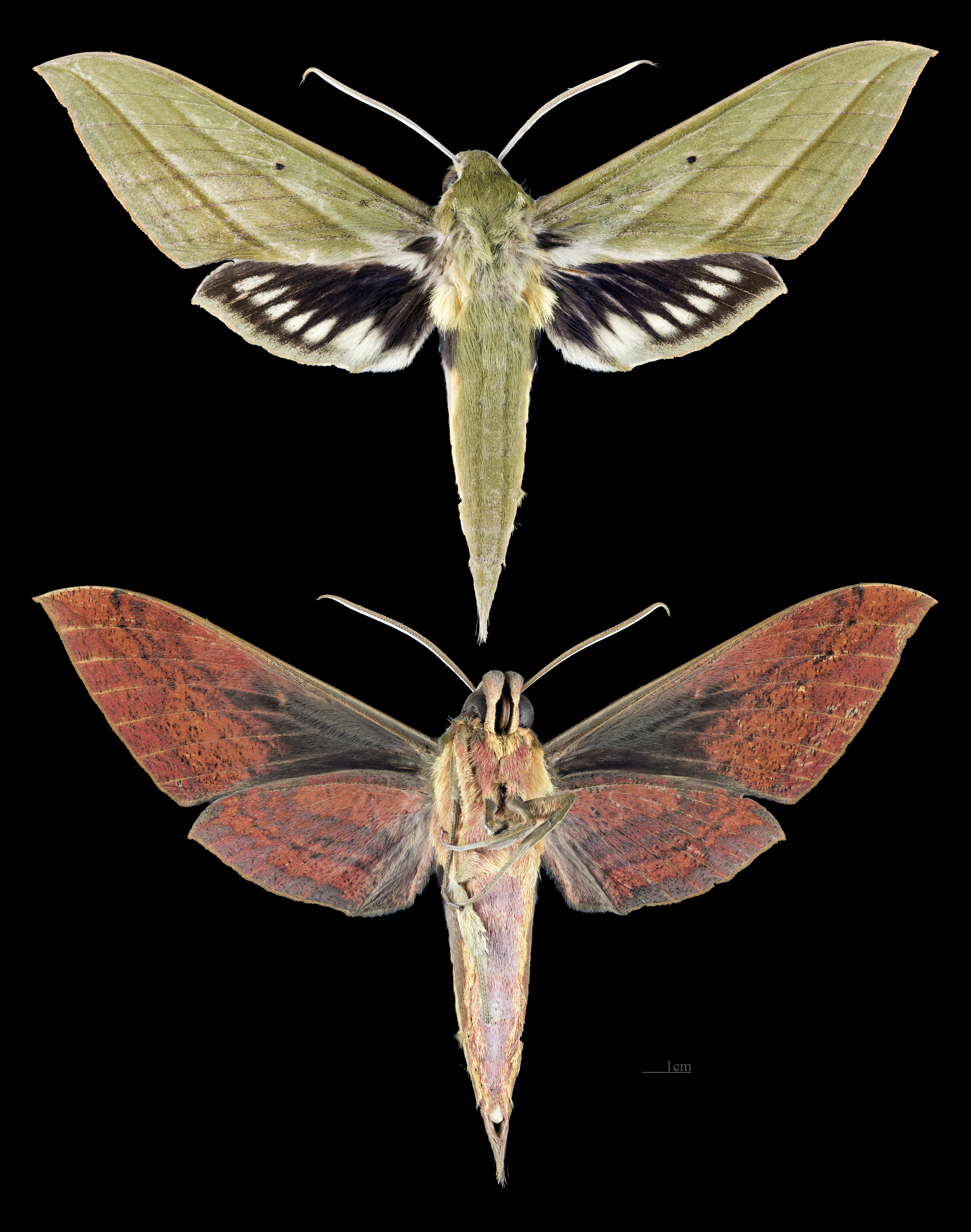
Xylophanes rhodochlora

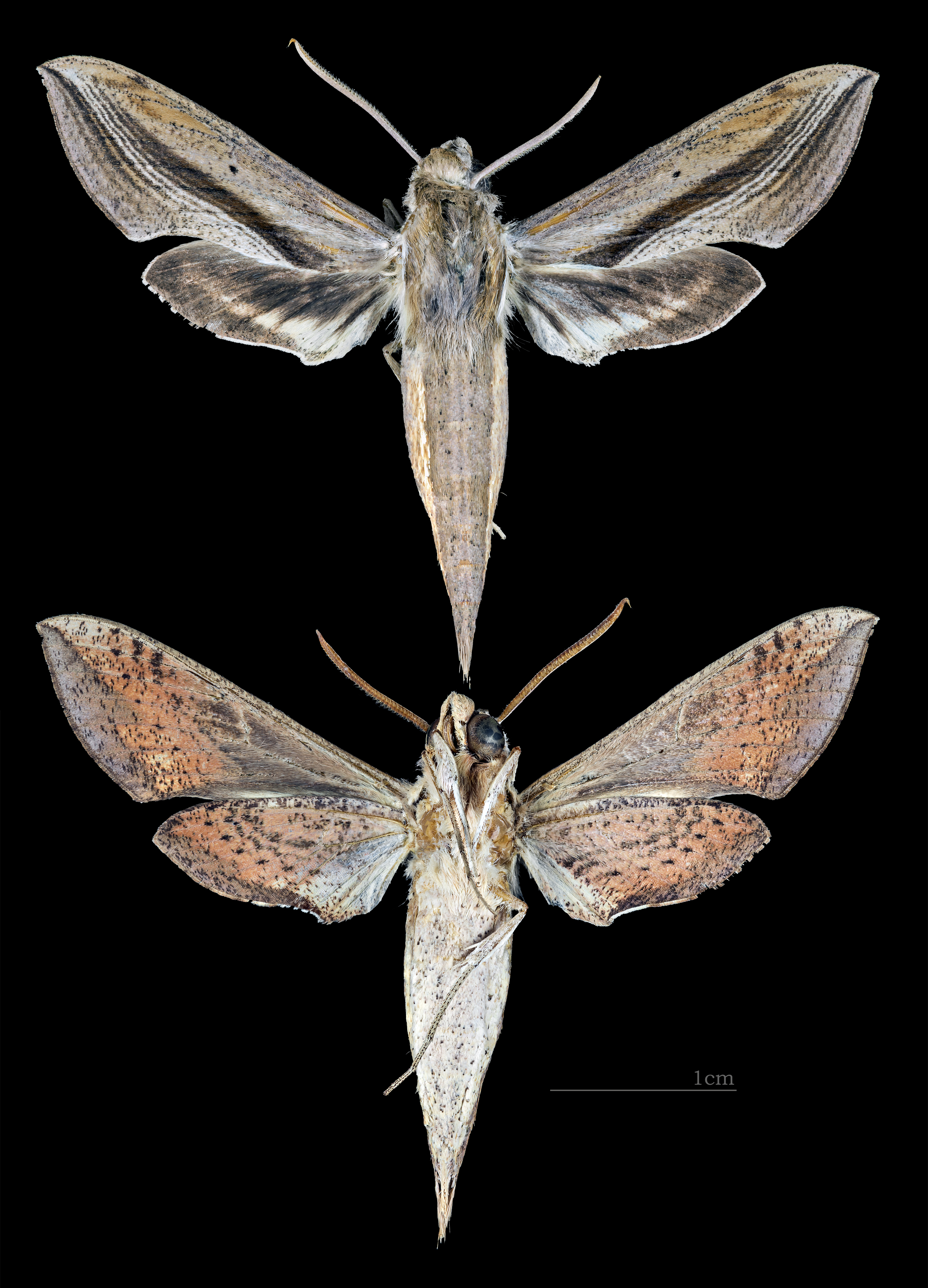
Xylophanes robinsonii

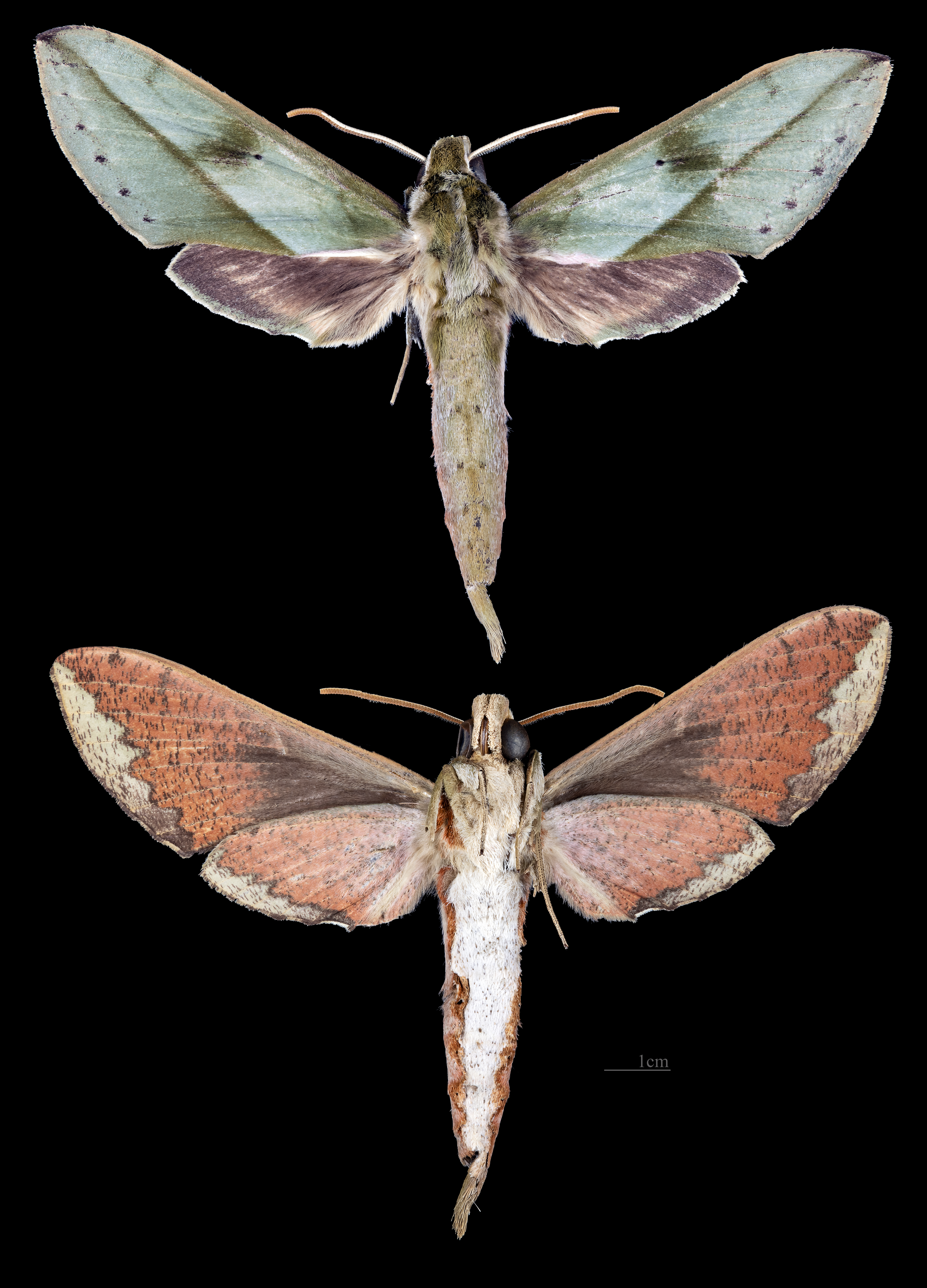
Xylophanes rothschildi

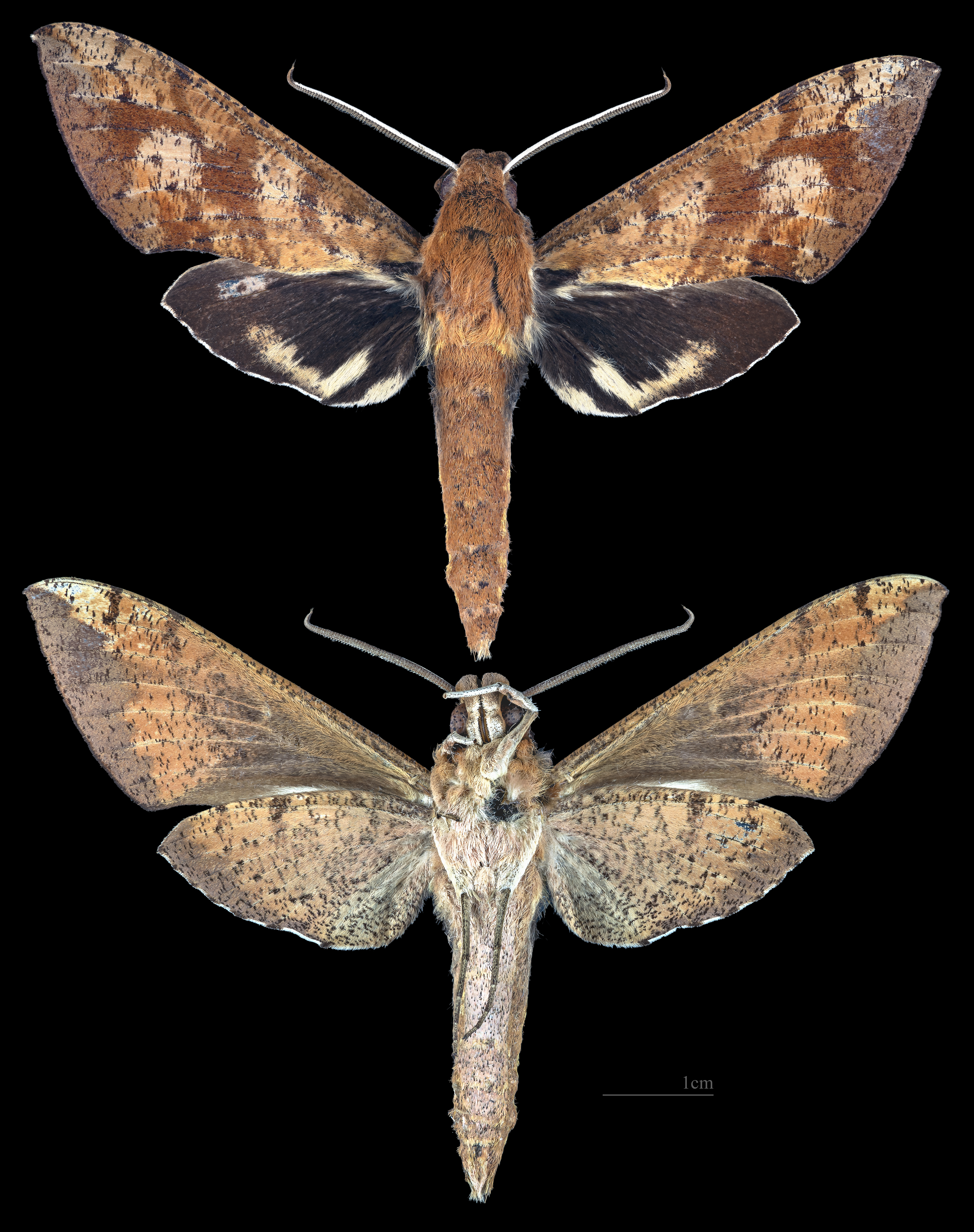
Xylophanes rufescens

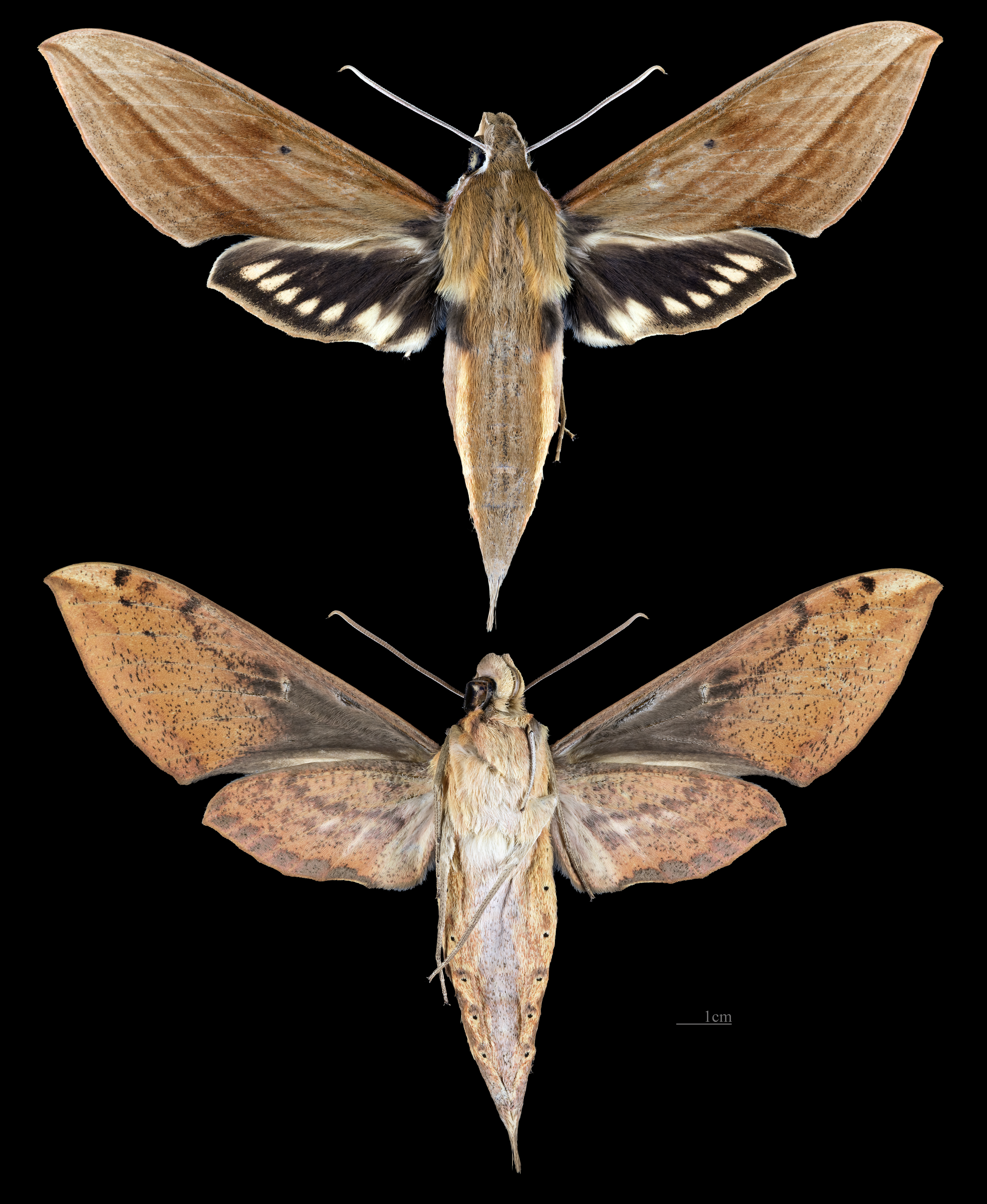
Xylophanes sarae

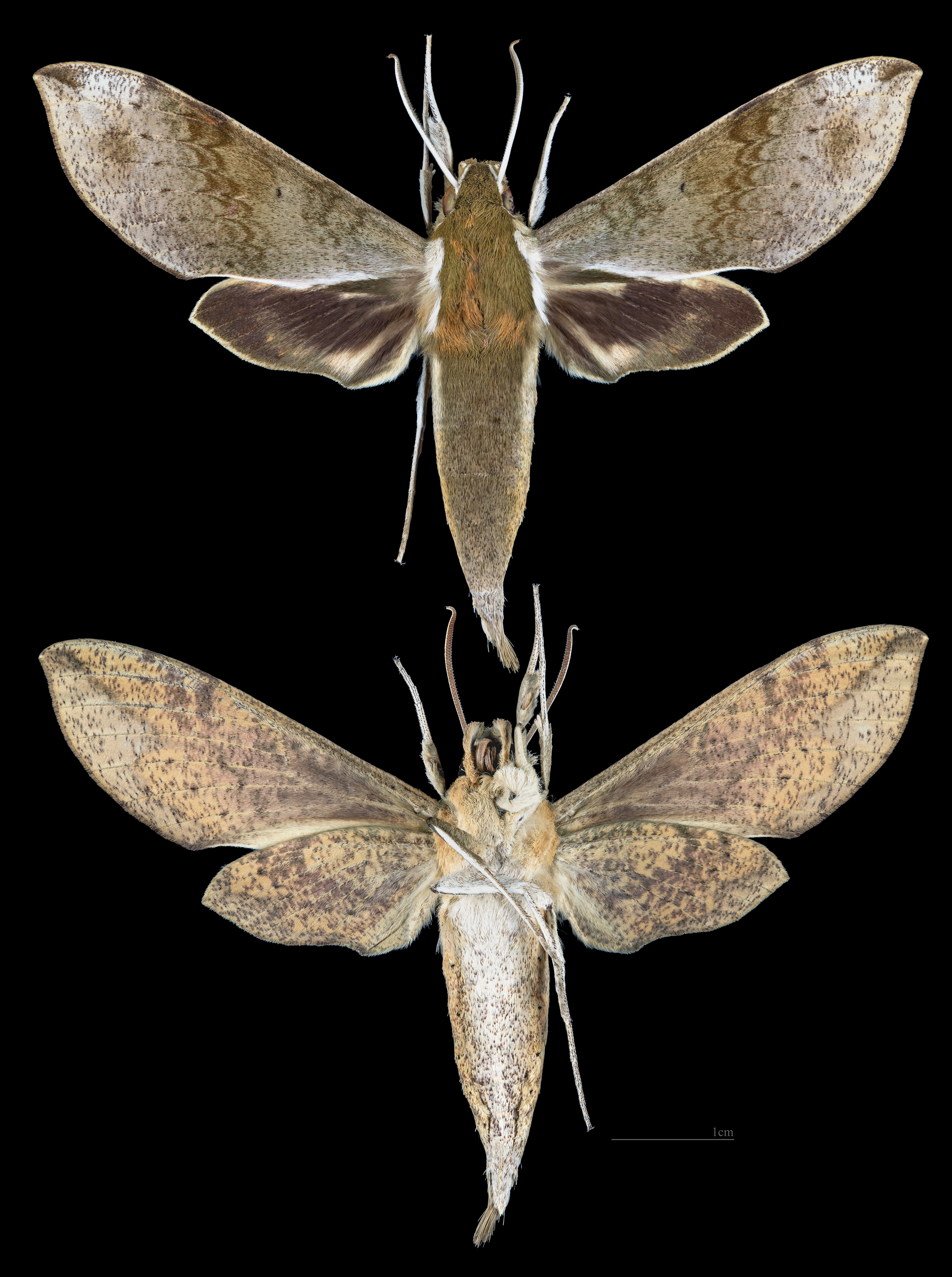
Xylophanes schausi

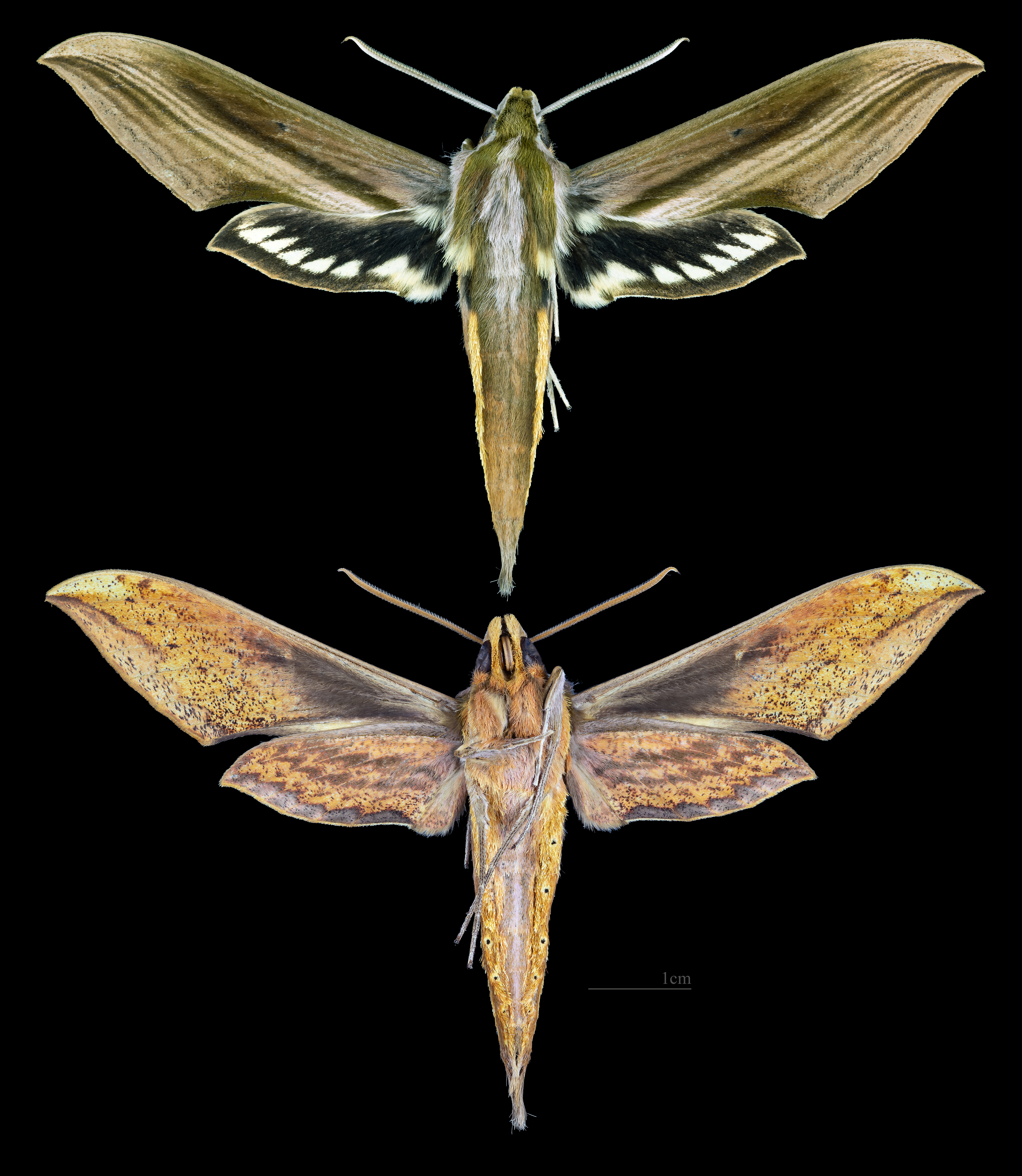
Xylophanes schreiteri

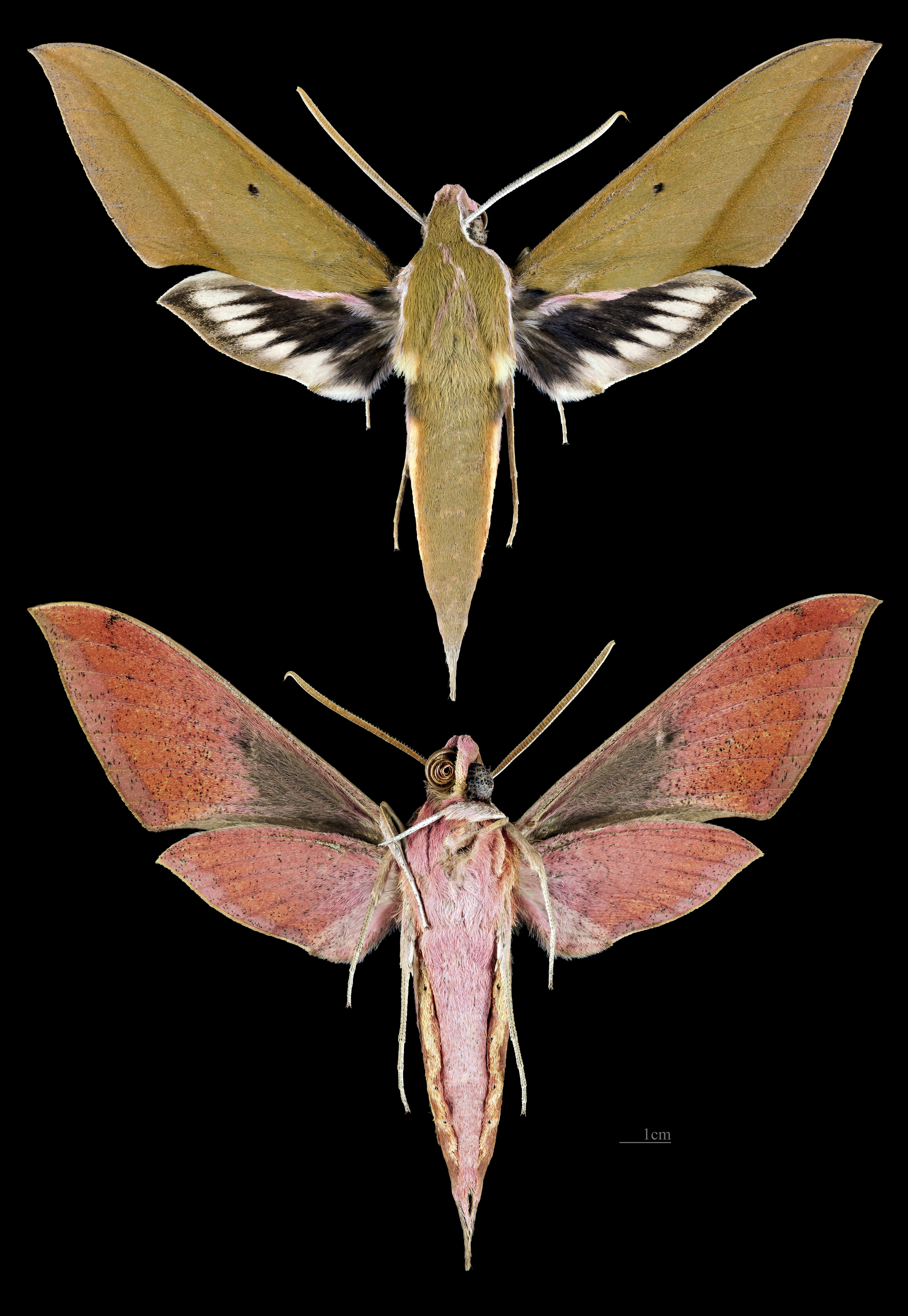
Xylophanes schwartzi

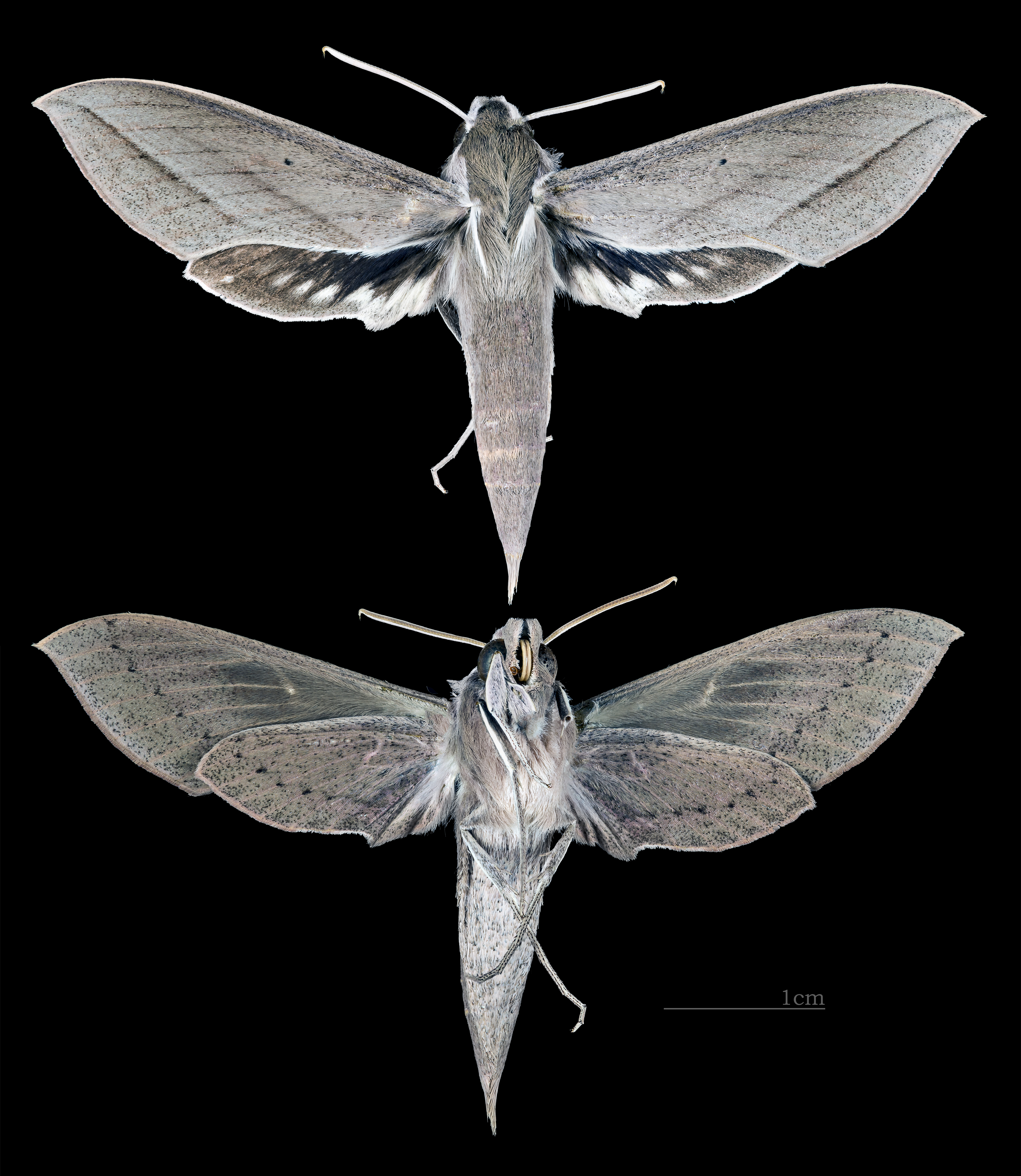
Xylophanes suana

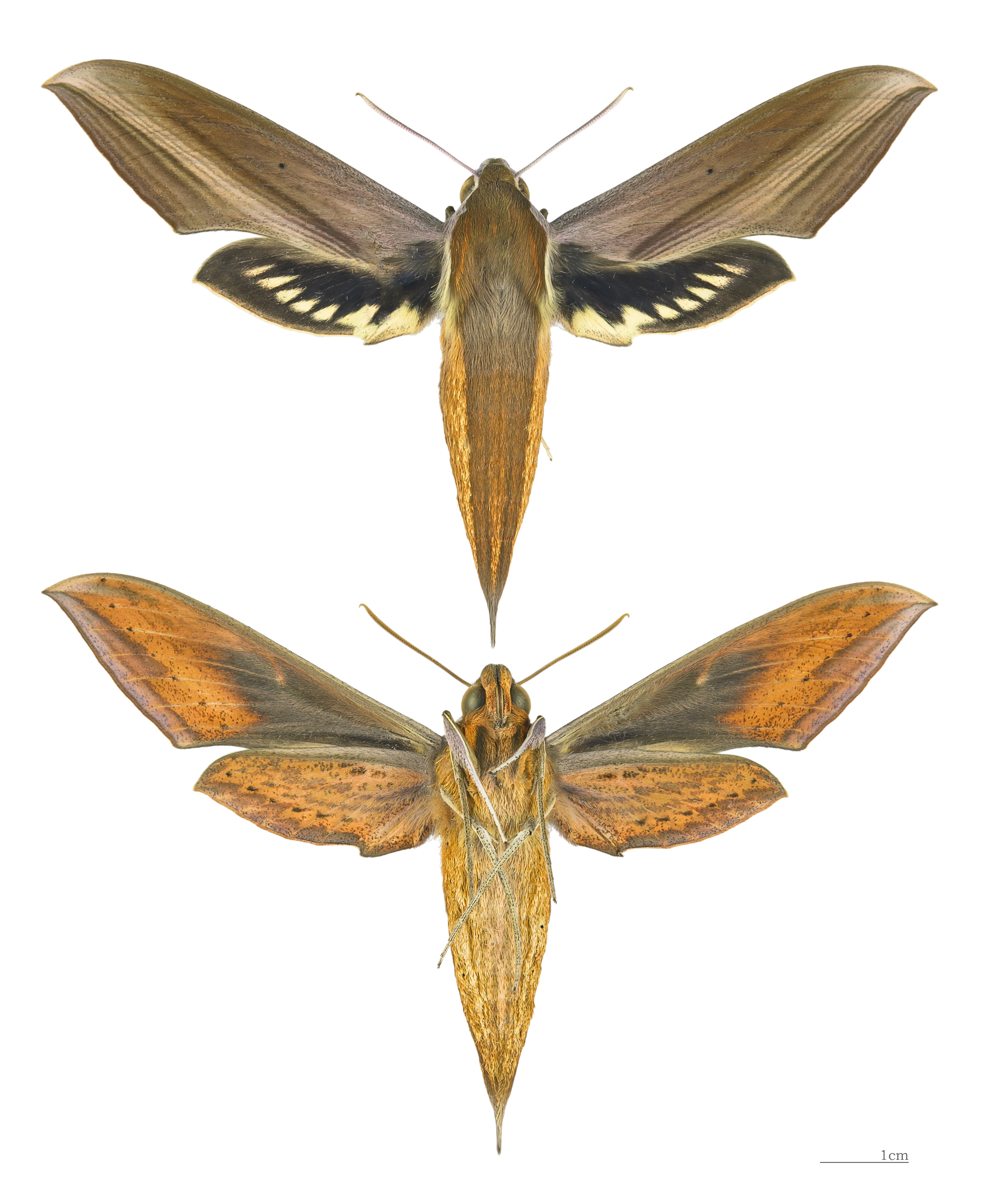
Xylophanes tersa

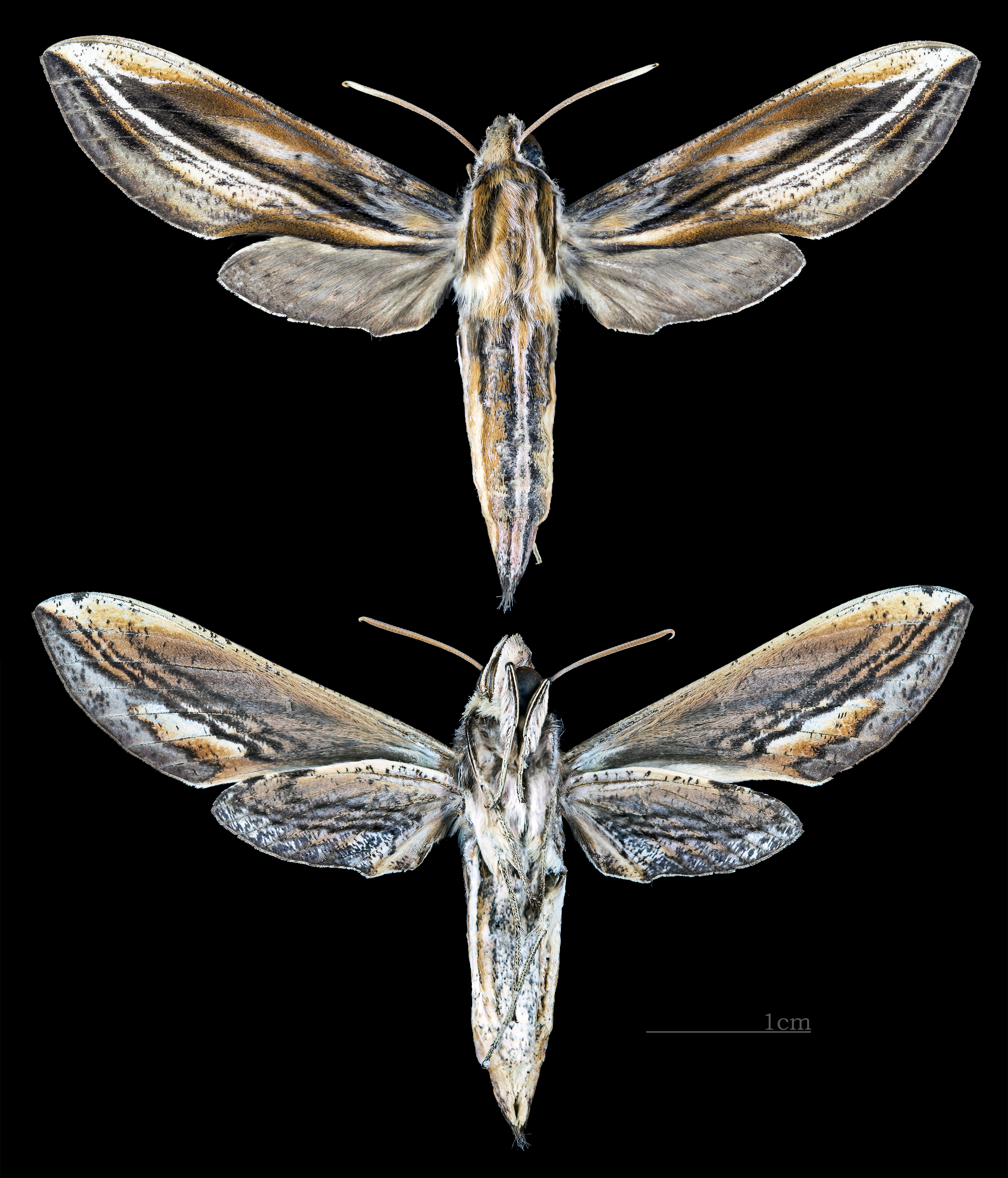
Xylophanes thyelia

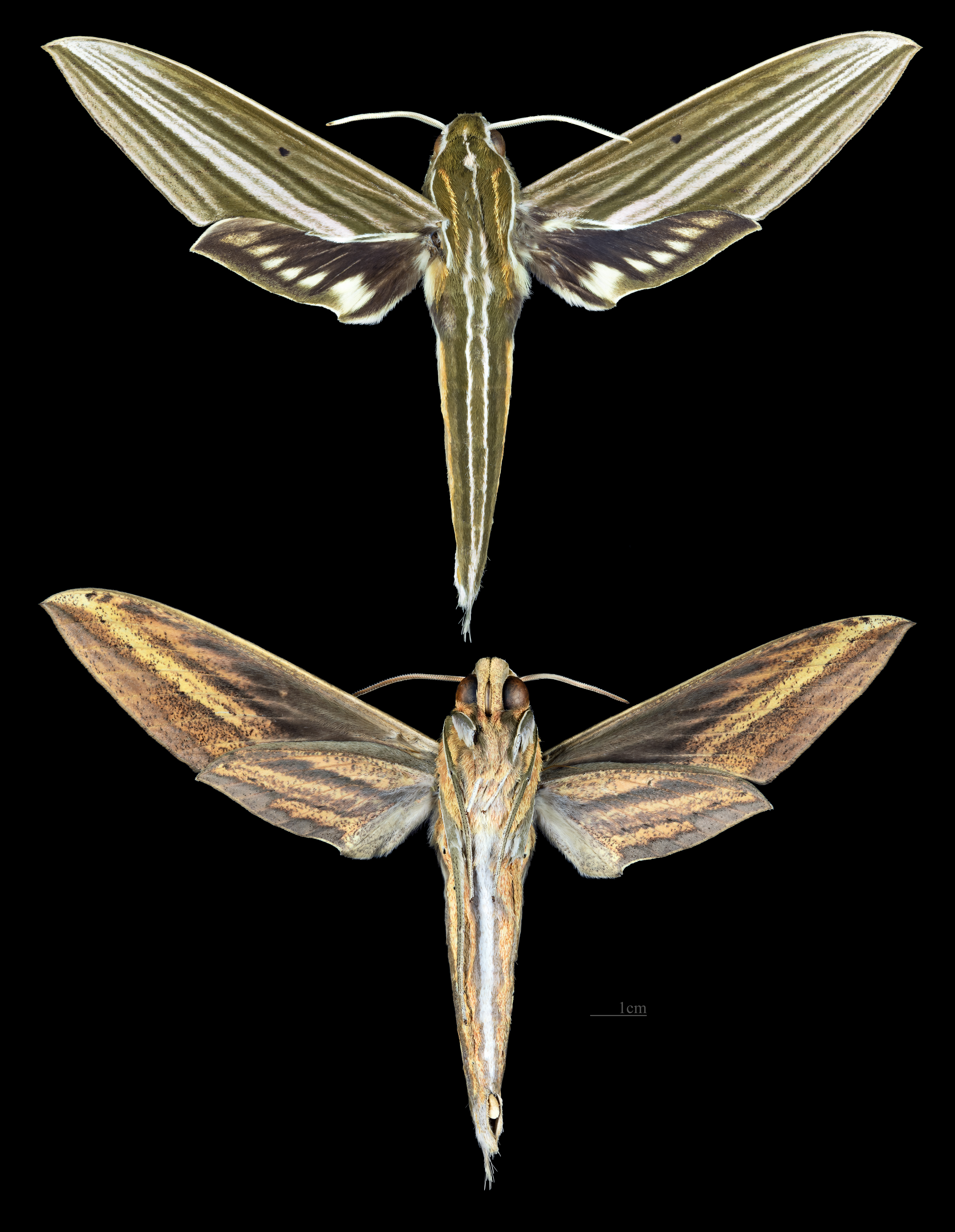
Xylophanes titana

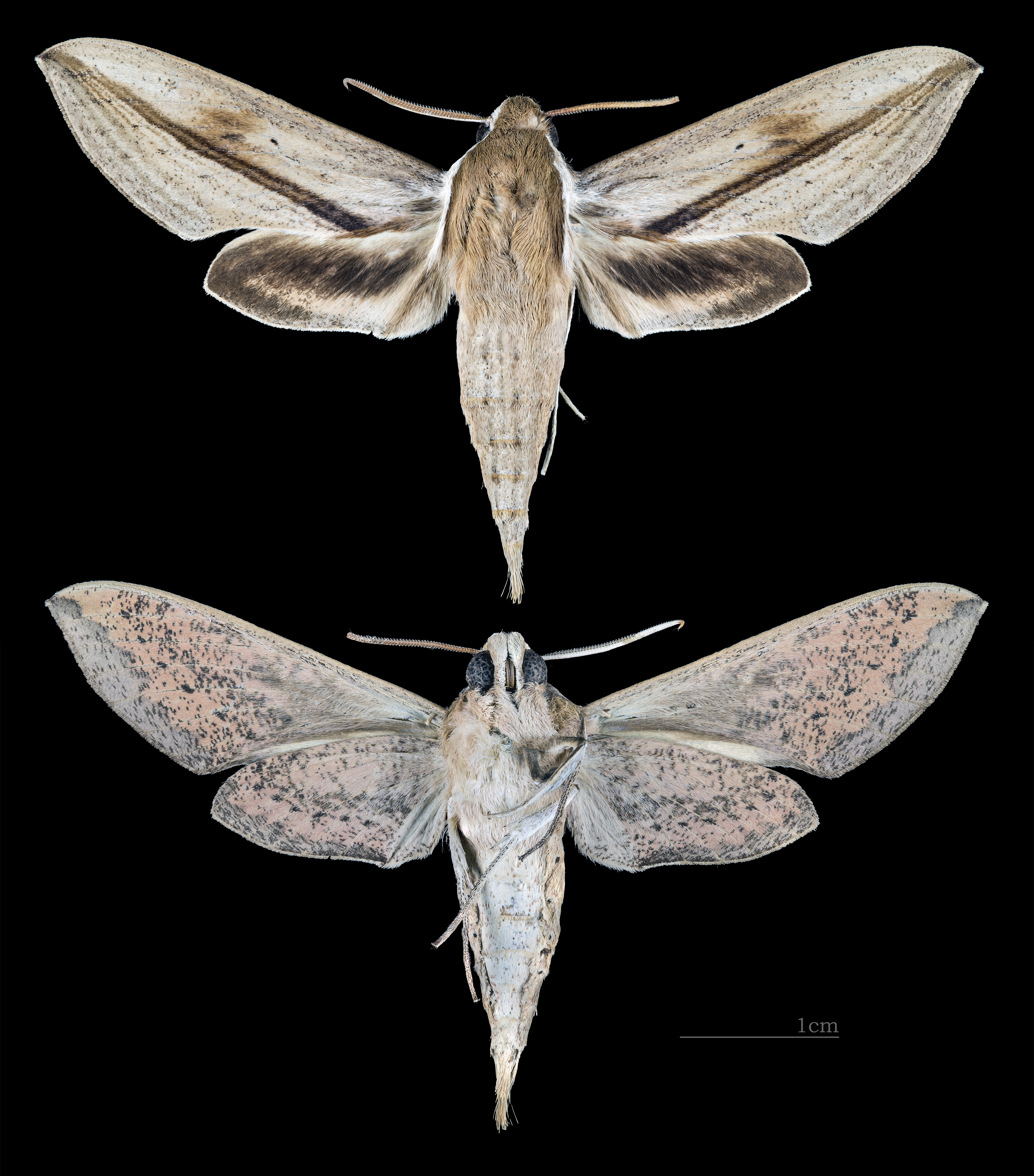
Xylophanes turbata

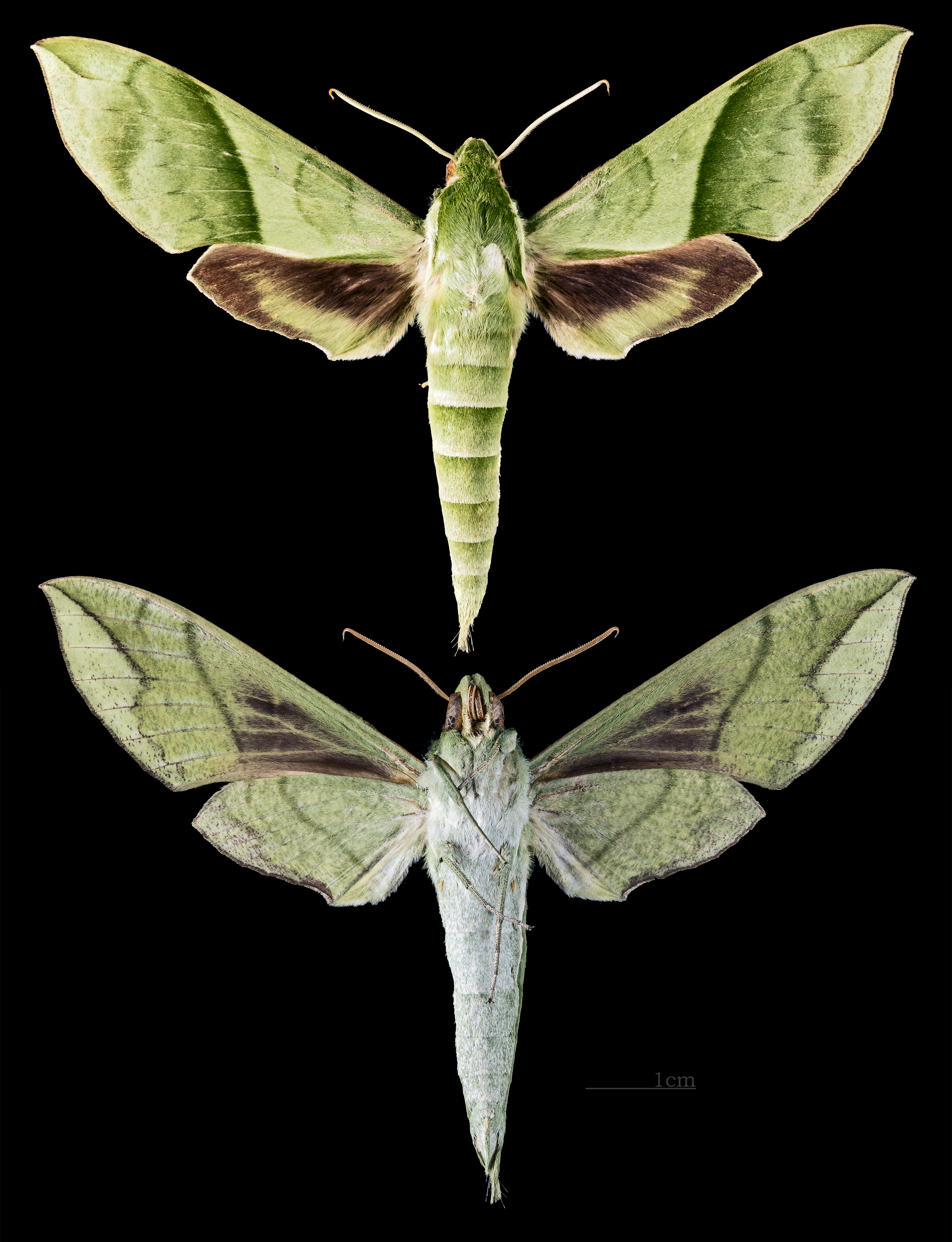
Xylophanes tyndarus

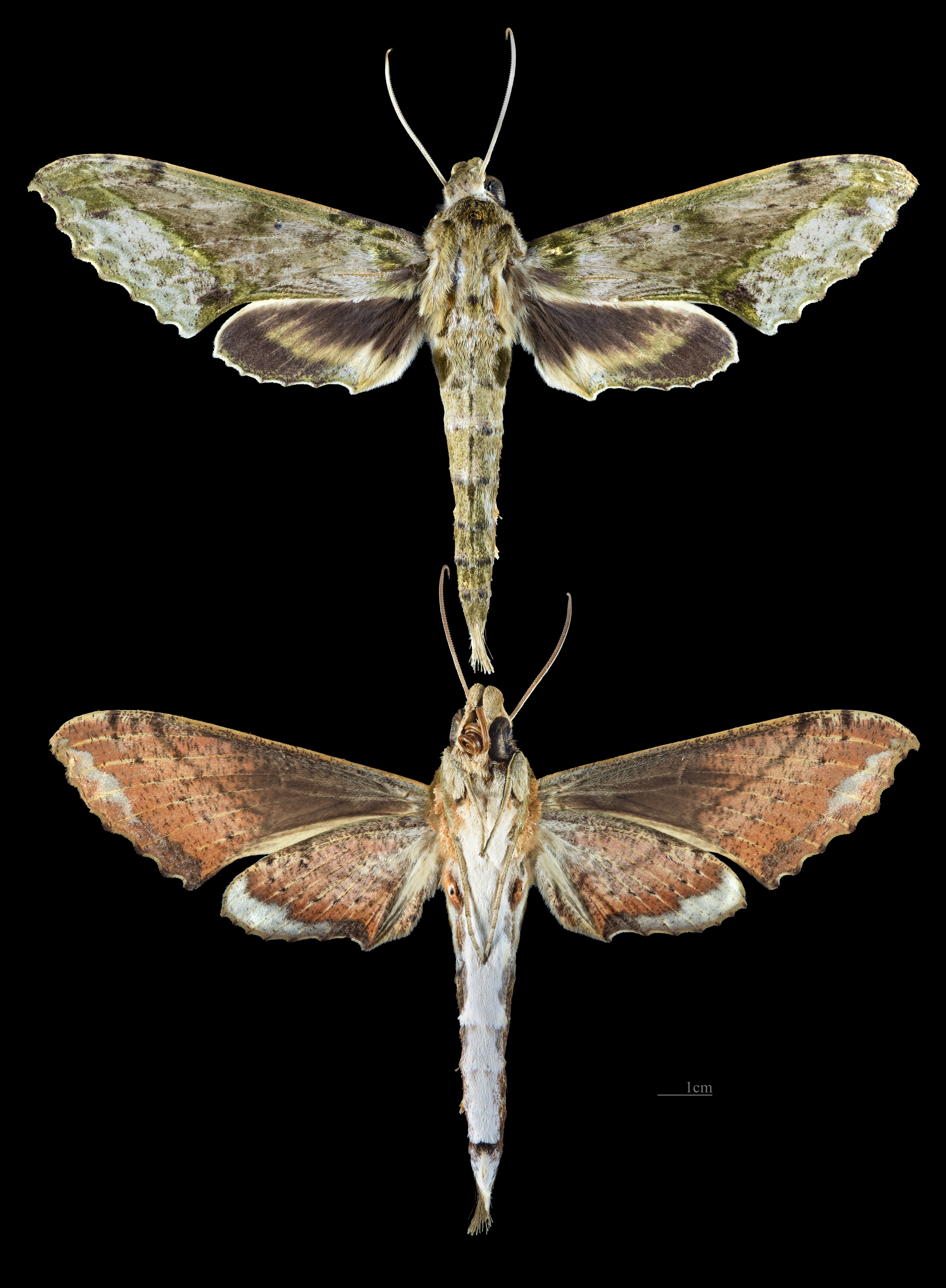
Xylophanes undata

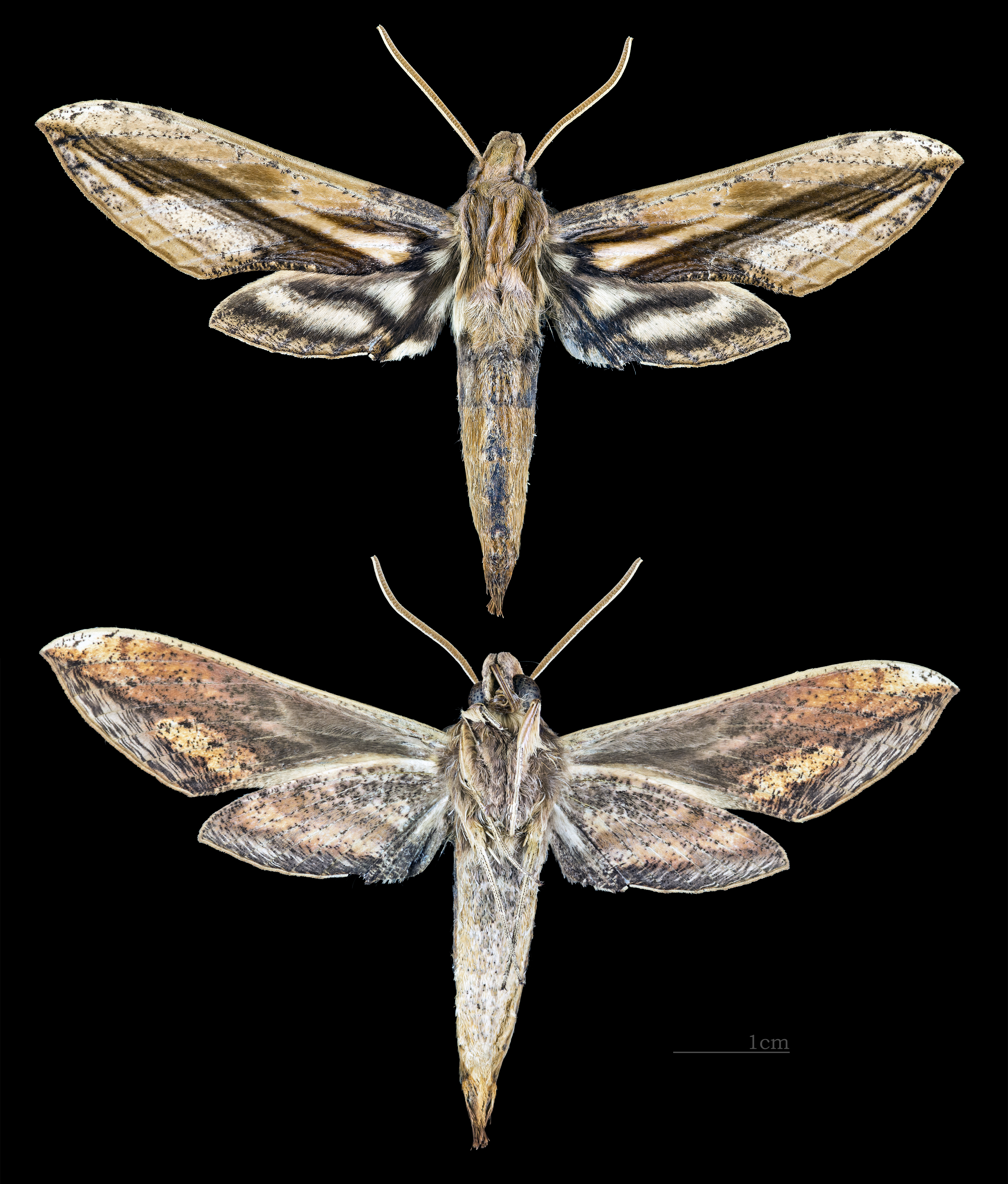
Xylophanes xylobotes

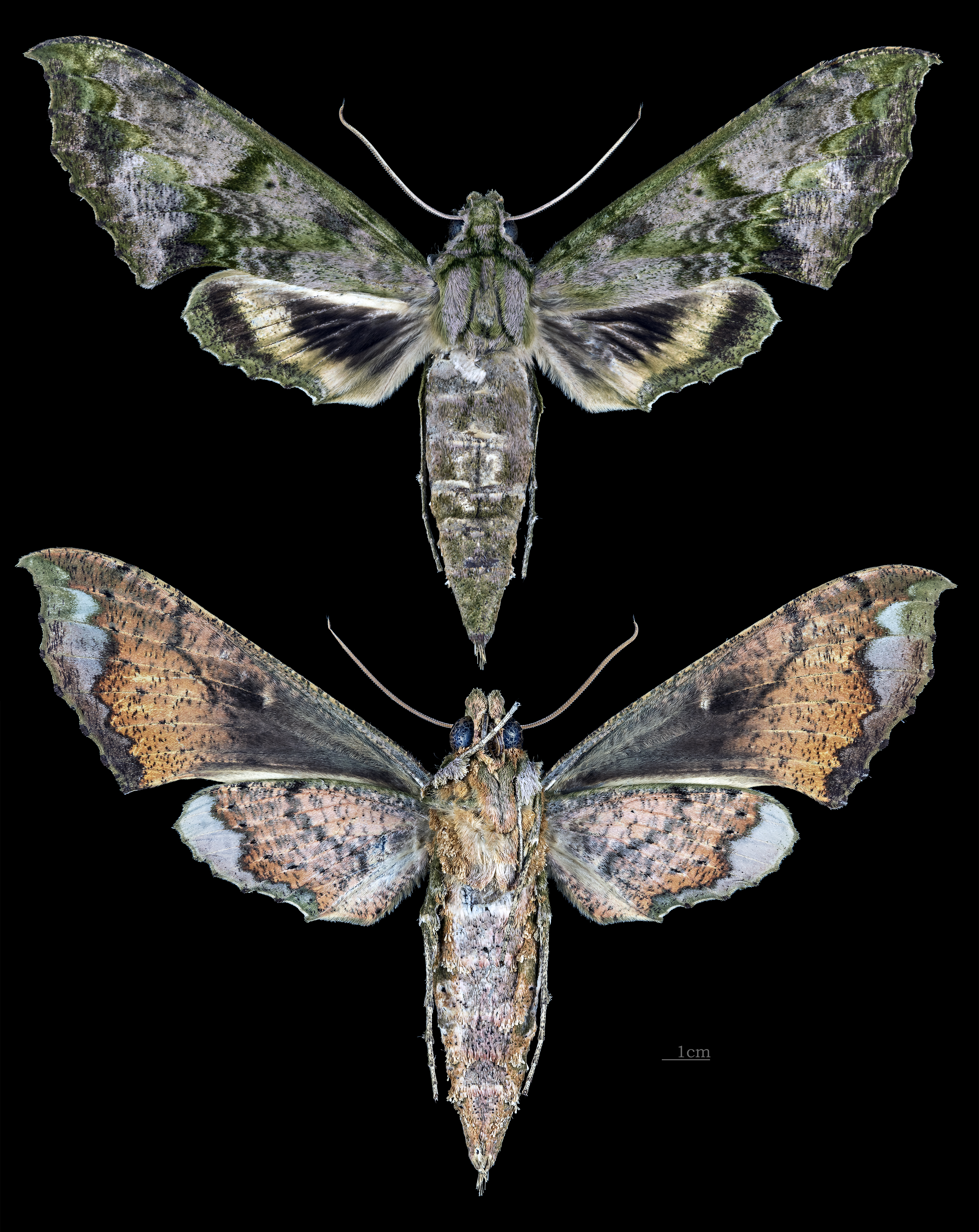
Xylophanes zurcheri
