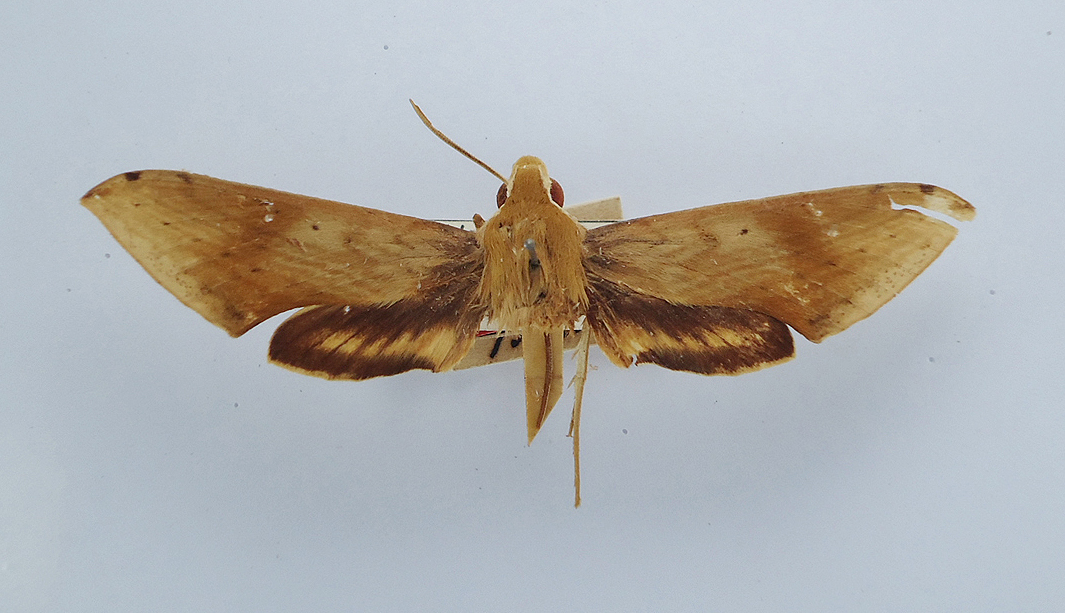
- Xylophanes pearsoni, holotype, male upperside. Brazil, Bahia, Grujahy (Castelo Novo) (MNRJ, 37.063)

Scientific classification
- Domain: Eukaryota
- Kingdom: Animalia
- Phylum: Arthropoda
- Class: Insecta
- Order: Lepidoptera
- Family: Sphingidae
- Genus: Xylophanes
- Species: X. pearsoni

Binomial name
- Xylophanes pearsoni Soares & Motta, 2002

= Xylophanes pearsoni =

Species of moth

Xylophanes pearsoni is a moth of the family Sphingidae. It is known from eastern Brazil.

The length of the forewings is about 35 mm for males and about 36 mm for females. It is similar to Xylophanes libya, except for some differences in the pattern of the forewing and hindwing upperside. Females are similar to males but have broader and rounder forewings and a pattern which is more contrasting.

The larvae probably feed on Rubiaceae and Malvaceae species.
