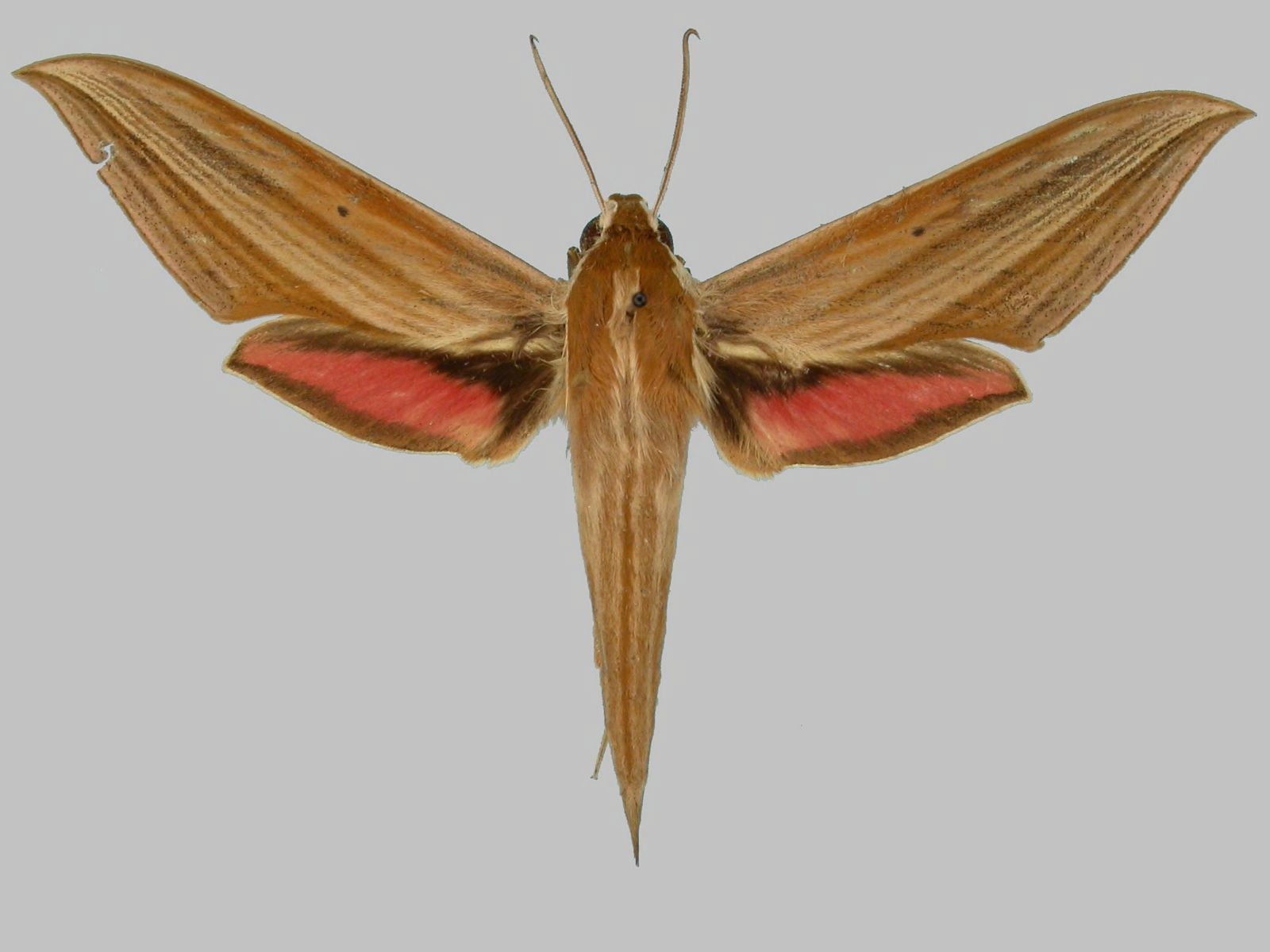
- Xylophanes cthulhu, male, upperside. Costa Rica

Scientific classification
- Kingdom: Animalia
- Phylum: Arthropoda
- Class: Insecta
- Order: Lepidoptera
- Family: Sphingidae
- Genus: Xylophanes
- Species: X. cthulhu

Binomial name
- Xylophanes cthulhu Haxaire & Vaglia, 2008

= Xylophanes cthulhu =

Species of moth

Xylophanes cthulhu is a species of moth in the family Sphingidae. It is known from lowland rainforest in Guatemala and Costa Rica.

The wingspan is 76–82 mm. It is similar to Xylophanes neoptolemus.

Adults are on wing year-round in Costa Rica.

The larvae feed on Ludwigia species. They have a snake-like appearance.
