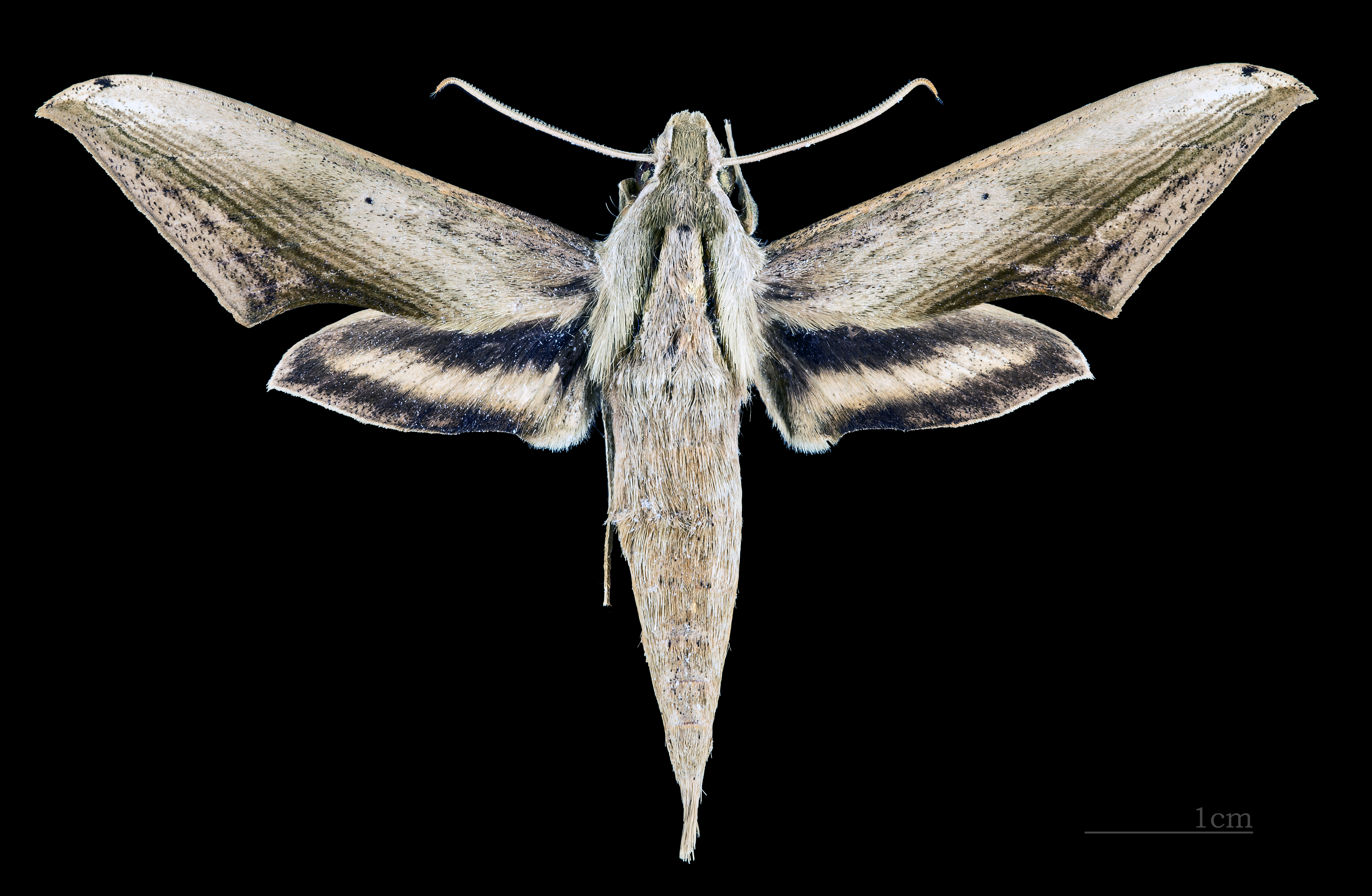
- Male dorsal view
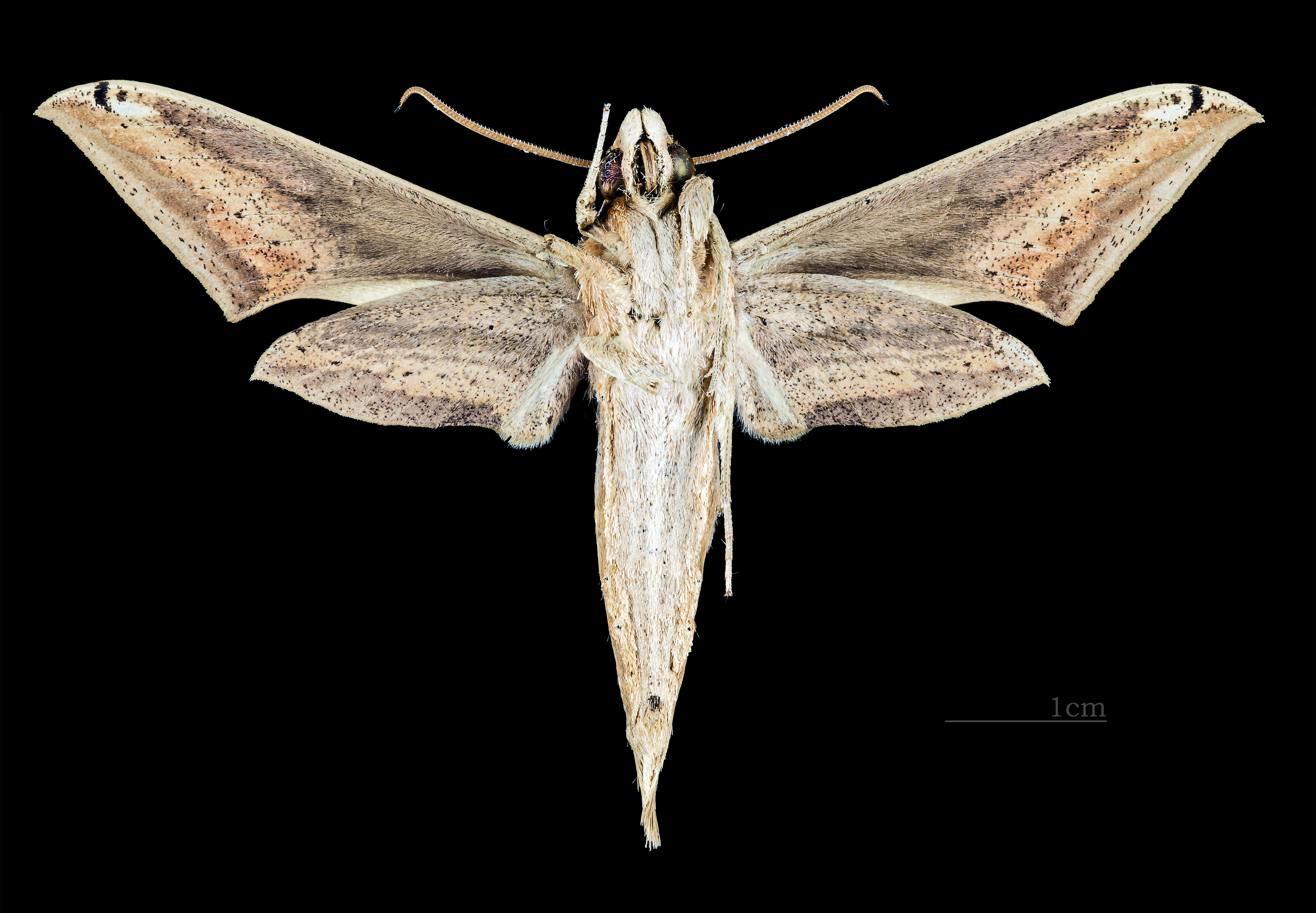
- Male ventral view

Scientific classification
- Domain: Eukaryota
- Kingdom: Animalia
- Phylum: Arthropoda
- Class: Insecta
- Order: Lepidoptera
- Family: Sphingidae
- Genus: Xylophanes
- Species: X. aglaor

Binomial name
- Xylophanes aglaor (Boisduval, 1875)

Synonyms
- Choerocampa aglaor Boisduval, 1875

= Xylophanes aglaor =

Species of moth

Xylophanes aglaor is a moth of the family Sphingidae first described by Jean Baptiste Boisduval in 1875.

== Distribution ==
It is found from Brazil west to Bolivia.

== Description ==
It is similar in appearance to several other members of the genus Xylophanes, but a number of differences distinguish it from Xylophanes libya, to which it most closely compares, particularly in its darker coloring and pattern, with its clearer contrasts. Black scales are scattered over the wings, which are otherwise striated with five postmedial lines.

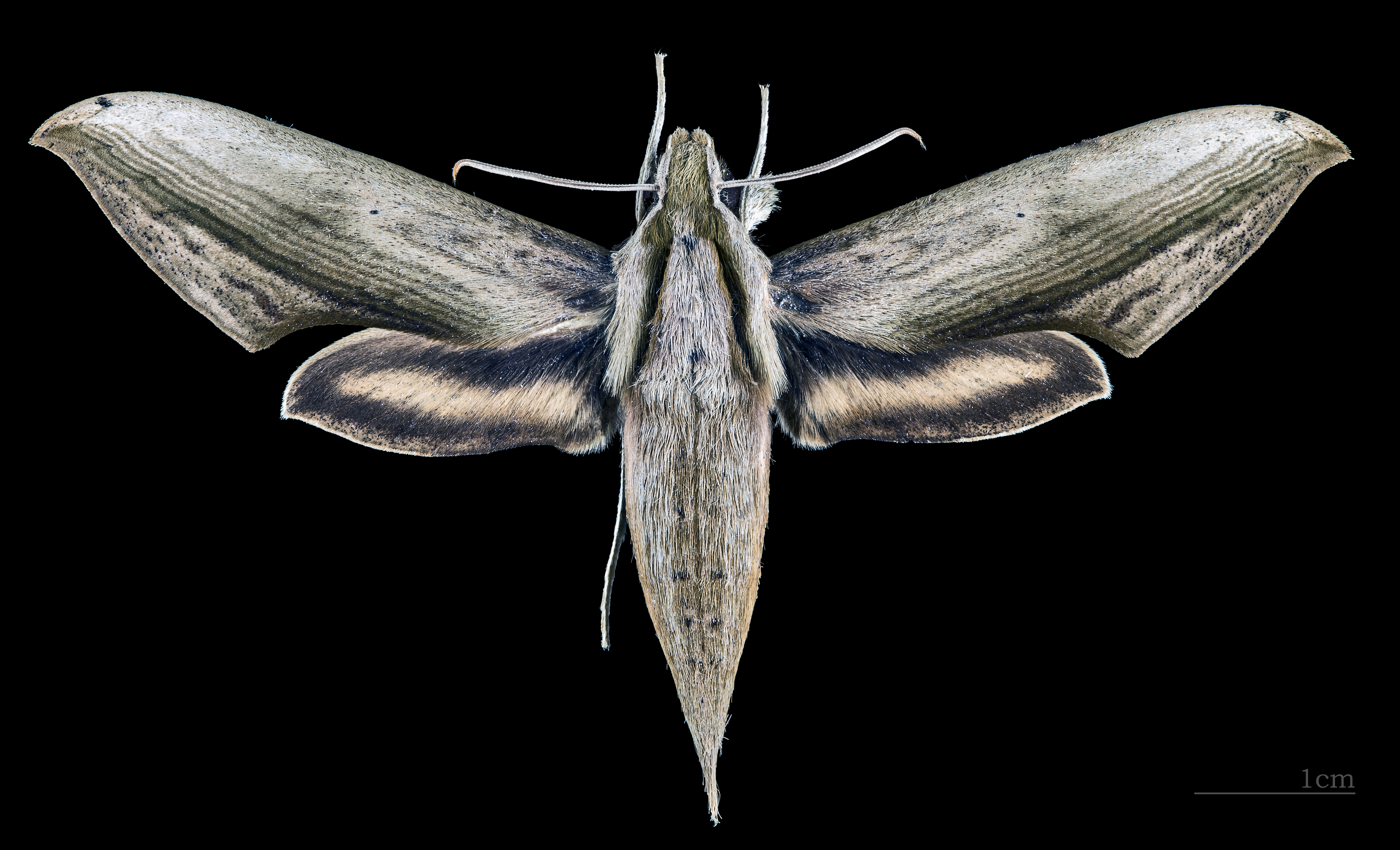
Female dorsal view

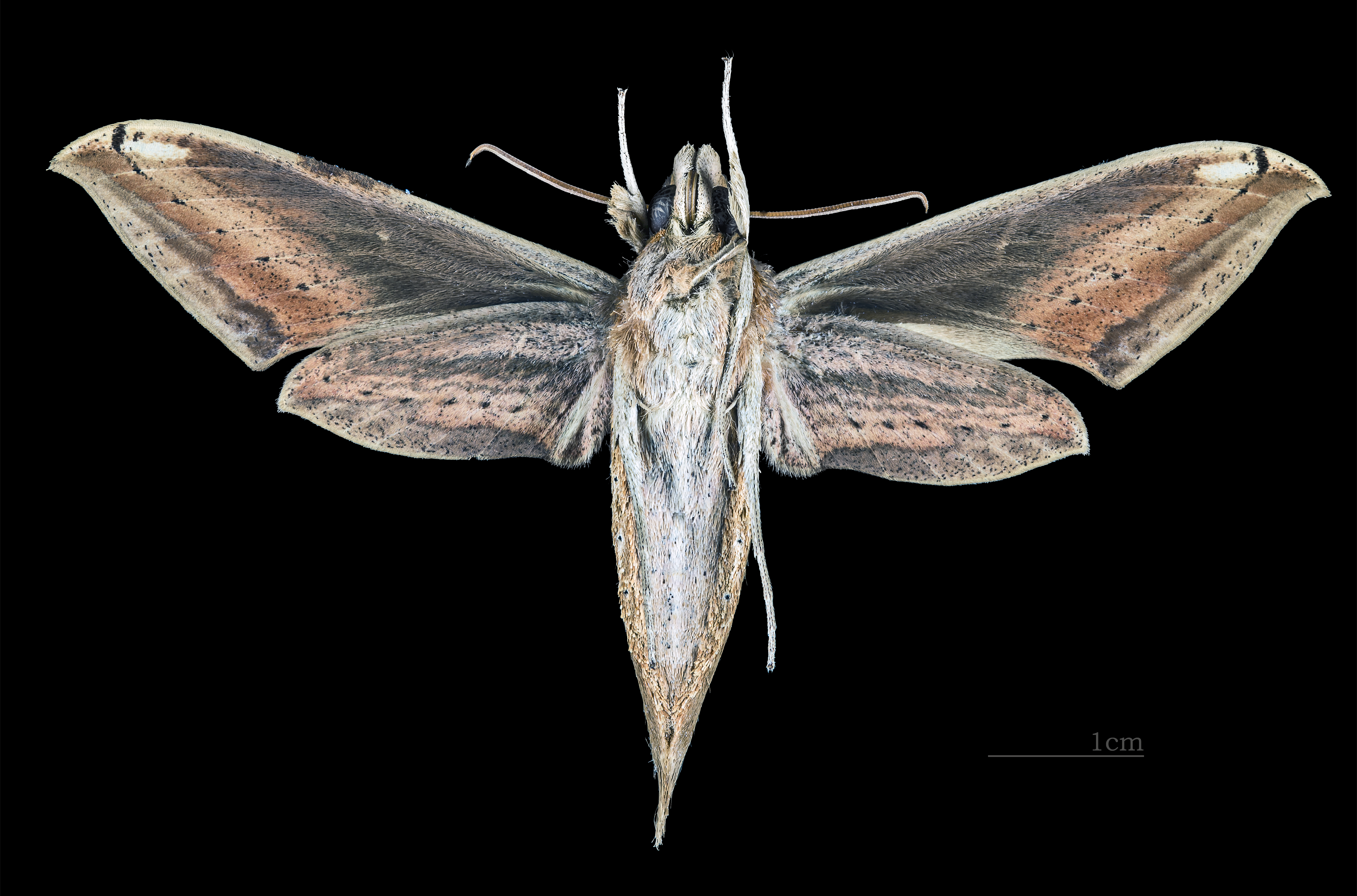
Female ventral view

== Biology ==
The larvae probably feed on Psychotria panamensis, Psychotria nervosa and Pavonia guanacastensis.
