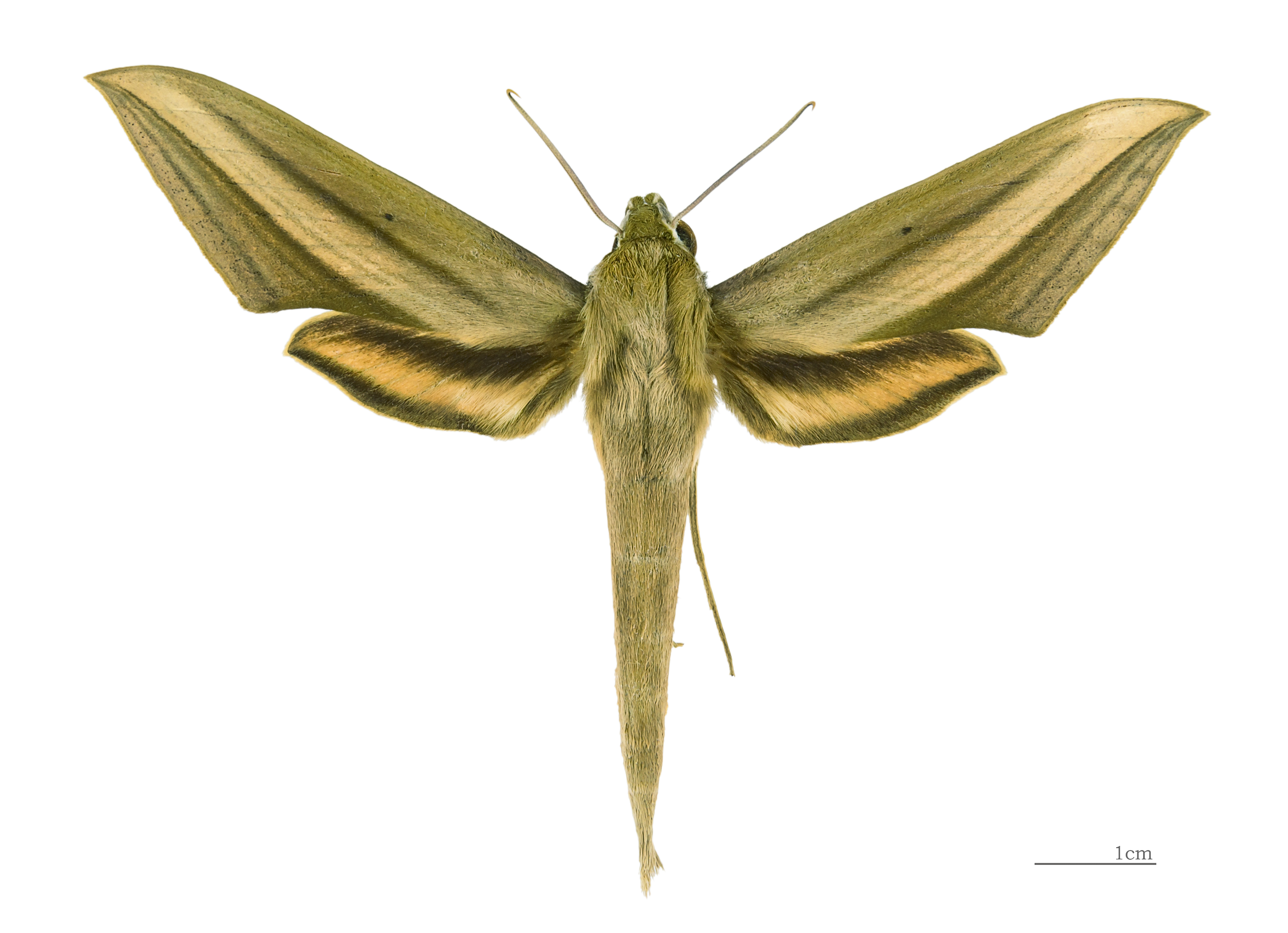

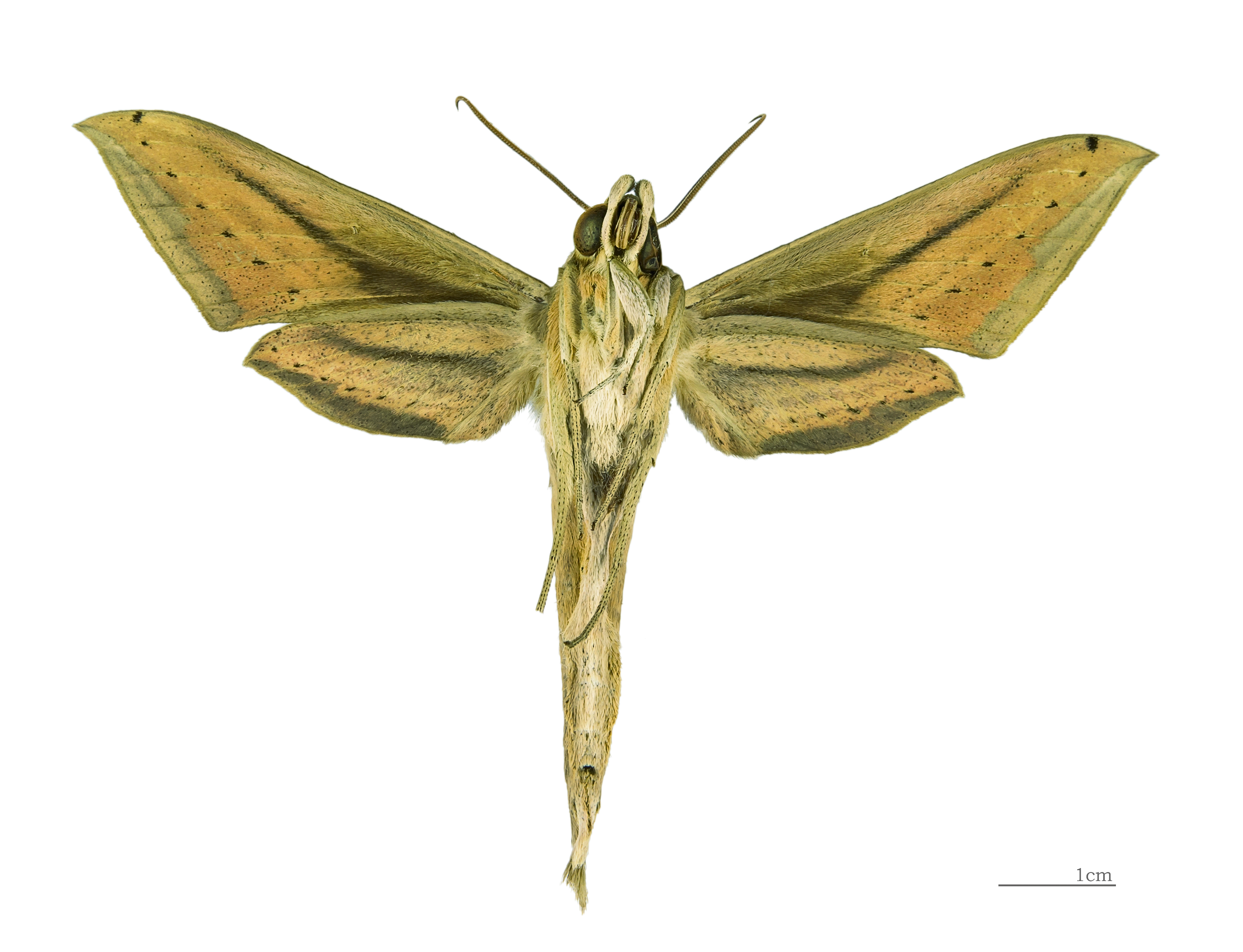
- Underside

Scientific classification
- Domain: Eukaryota
- Kingdom: Animalia
- Phylum: Arthropoda
- Class: Insecta
- Order: Lepidoptera
- Family: Sphingidae
- Genus: Xylophanes
- Species: X. loelia

Binomial name
- Xylophanes loelia (H. Druce, 1878)

Synonyms
- Choerocampa loelia H. Druce, 1878; Xylophanes heinrichi Closs, 1917

= Xylophanes loelia =

Species of moth

Xylophanes loelia is a moth of the family Sphingidae first described by Herbert Druce in 1878.

== Distribution ==
It is found from south-western Belize to Costa Rica and Panama to Peru, Bolivia and Argentina. It is possibly also present in Paraguay.

== Description ==
The wingspan is about 72 mm. It is intermediate between Xylophanes libya and Xylophanes neoptolemus. The hindwings are narrower than in Xylophanes libya, and the first postmedian line of the forewing underside is thin, continuous, more oblique and not as dark. The second and third postmedian lines are faintly indicated, and the fourth postmedian line is not as conspicuous. The median band on the hindwing upperside is redder (but paler than in Xylophanes neoptolemus), and the marginal band is more even, narrow and sharply defined. The postmedian lines of the hindwing underside are straighter and not divided into spots. The inner edge of the marginal band is more even and continuous.

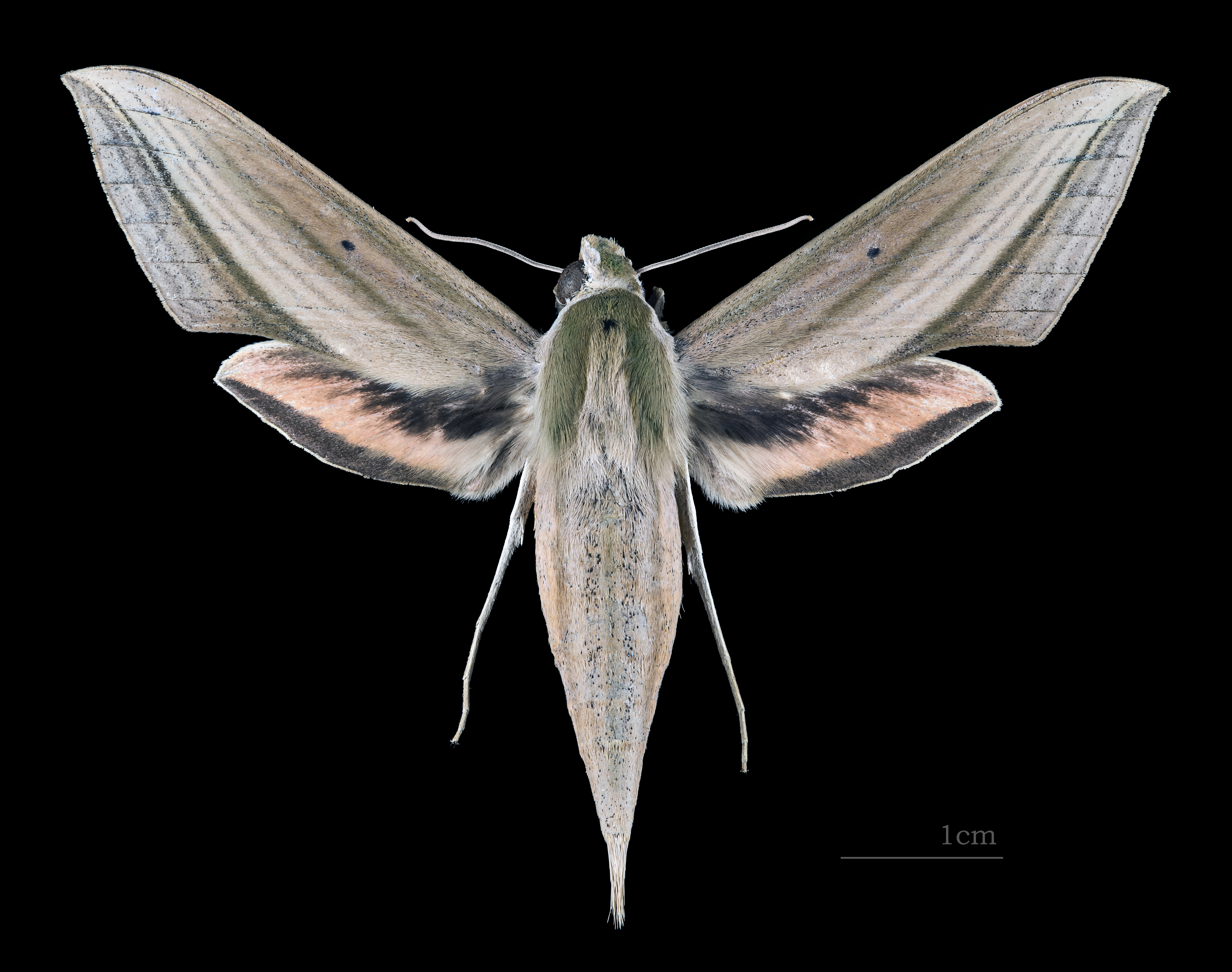
Female dorsal view

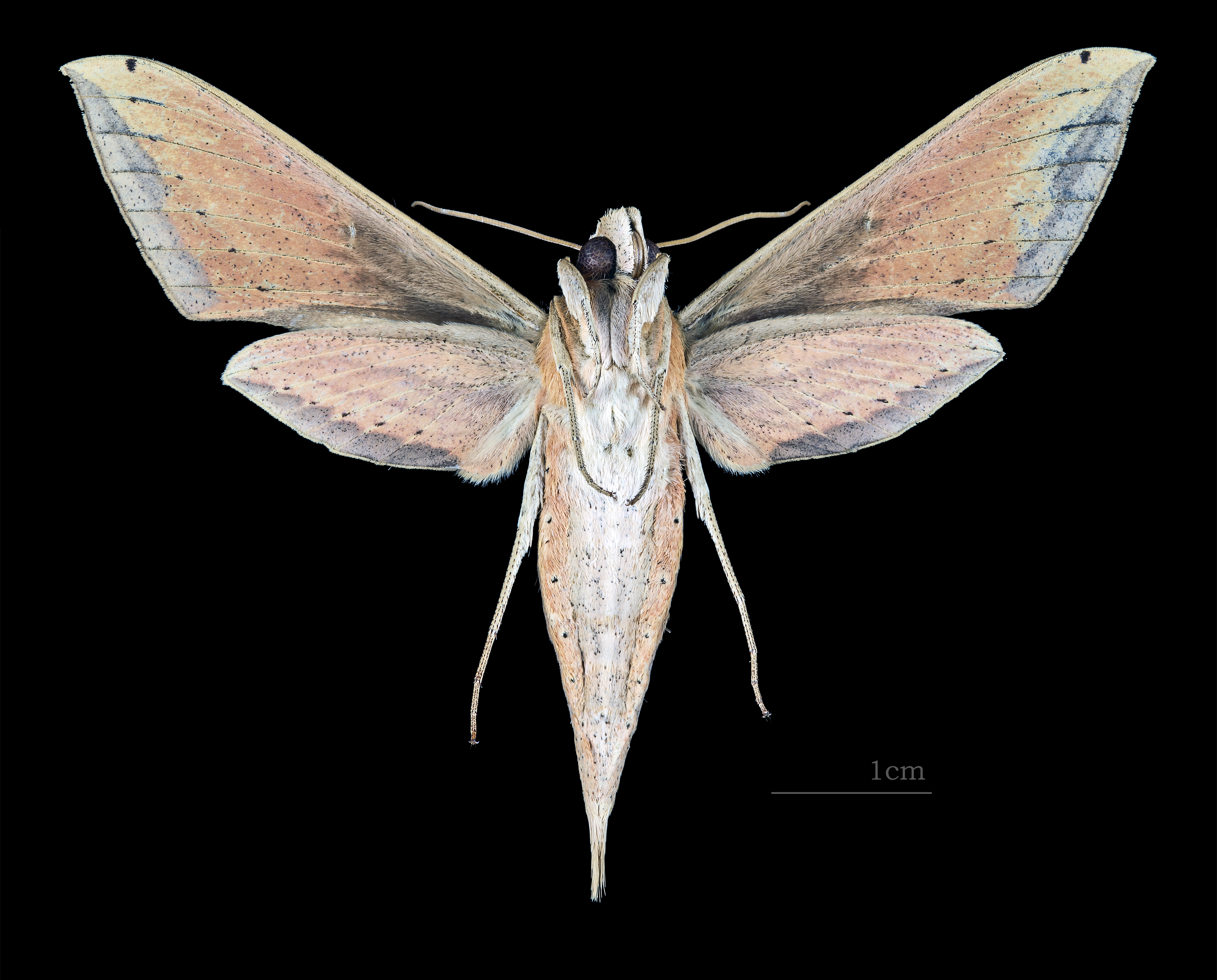
Female ventral view

== Biology ==
Adults are probably on wing year round. In Argentina adults have been reported in November.

The larvae possibly feed on Psychotria horizontalis, Psychotria nervosa and Psychotria microdon.
