= Xylophanes balcazari =

Scientific classification
- Domain: Eukaryota
- Kingdom: Animalia
- Phylum: Arthropoda
- Class: Insecta
- Order: Lepidoptera
- Family: Sphingidae
- Genus: Xylophanes
- Species: X. balcazari

Binomial name
- Xylophanes balcazari Haxaire & Vaglia, 2008

Species of moth

Xylophanes balcazari is a moth of the family Sphingidae. It is found from Mexico and possibly south to Belize. Although originally thought to be a member of Xylophanes neoptolemus, it was given its own designation due to DNA barcoding results.
