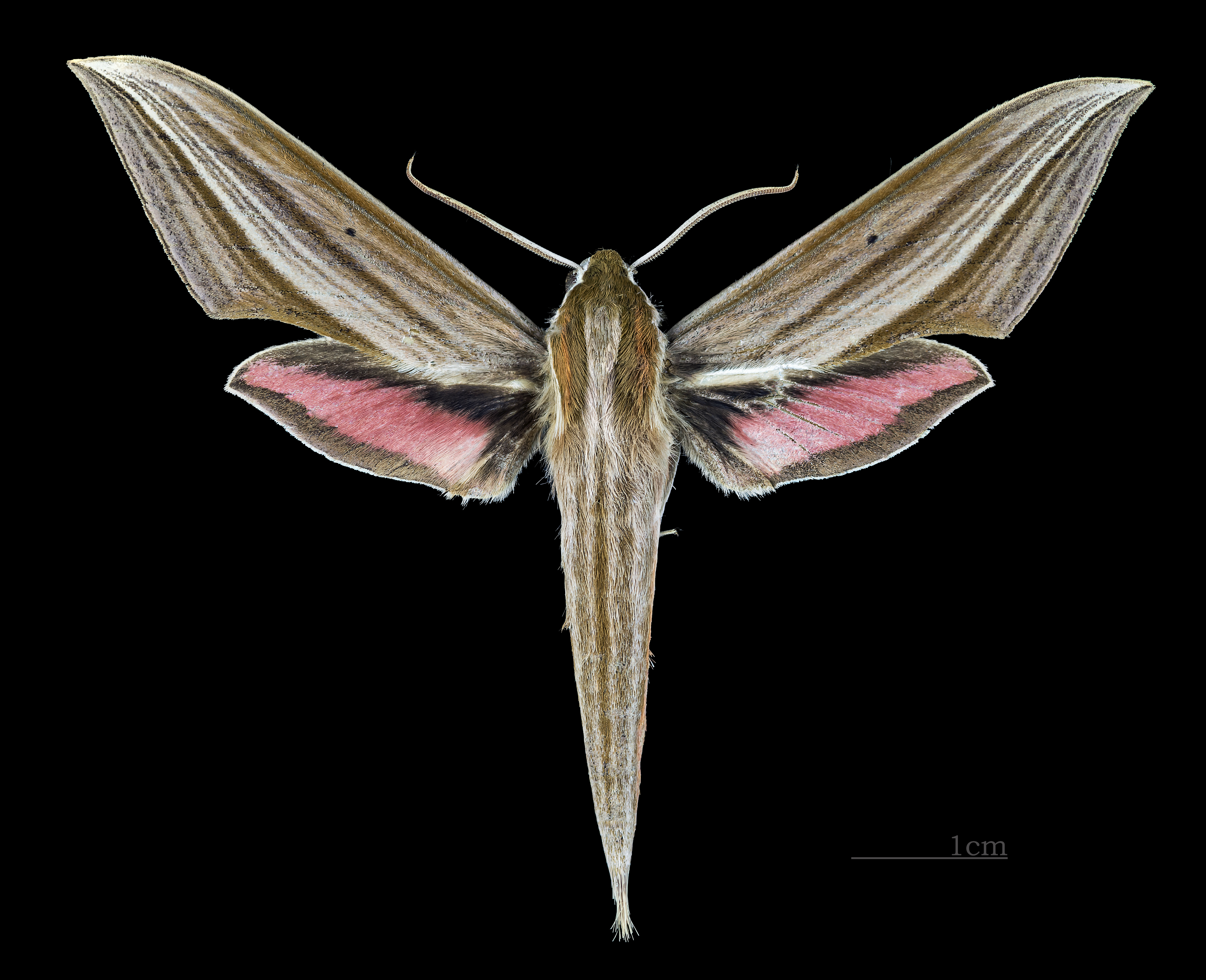
- Male dorsal
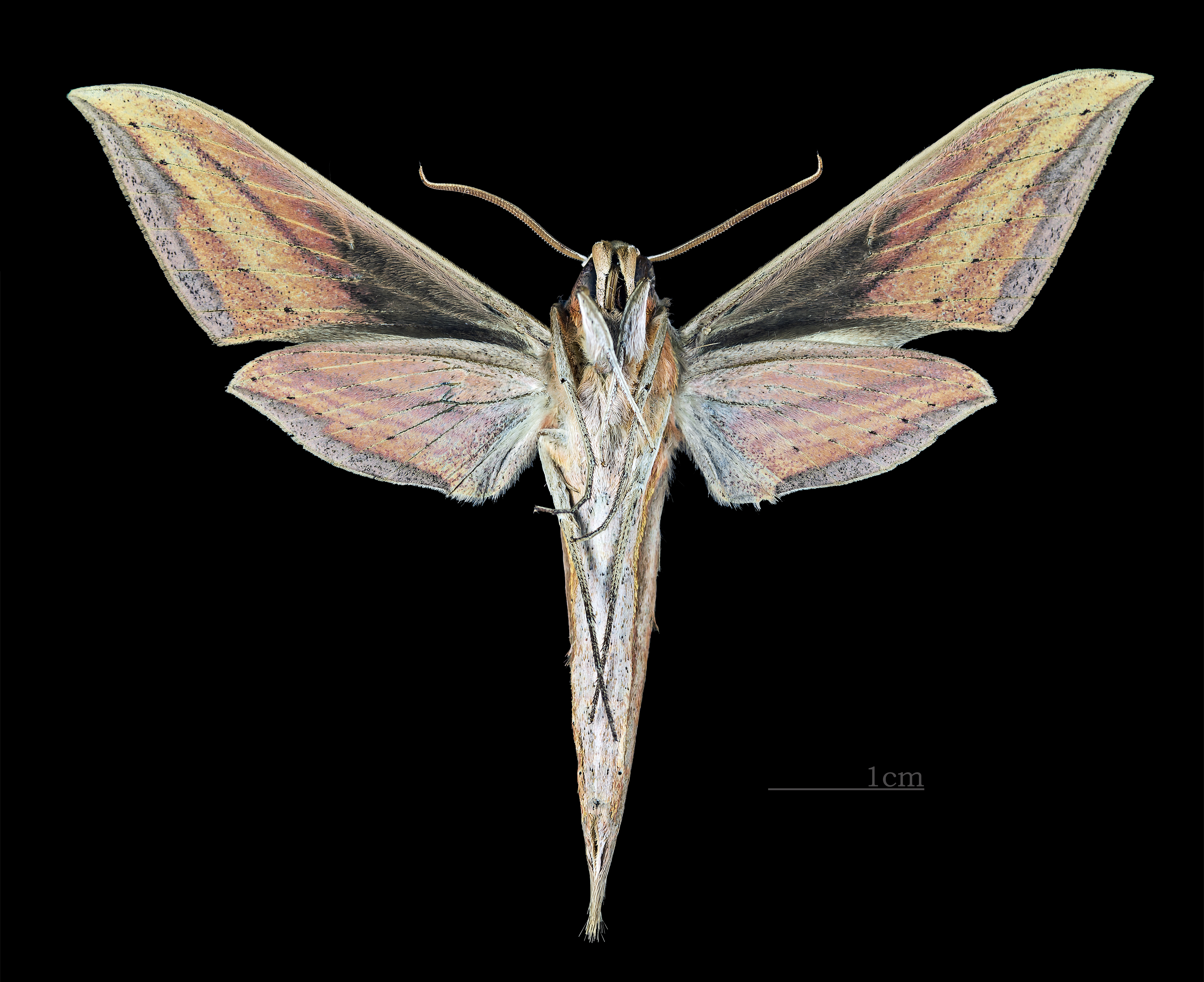
- Male ventral

Scientific classification
- Domain: Eukaryota
- Kingdom: Animalia
- Phylum: Arthropoda
- Class: Insecta
- Order: Lepidoptera
- Family: Sphingidae
- Genus: Xylophanes
- Species: X. neoptolemus

Binomial name
- Xylophanes neoptolemus (Cramer, 1780)

Synonyms
- Sphinx neoptolemus Cramer, 1780; Chaerocampa brasiliensis Schaufuss, 1870; Chaerocampa trilineata Walker, 1865; Xylophanes neoptolemus trinitatis Closs, 1917

= Xylophanes neoptolemus =

Species of moth

Xylophanes neoptolemus is a moth of the family Sphingidae.

== Distribution ==
It is found from Trinidad and Suriname to Venezuela and north-western Brazil. It is probably present in much of South America.

== Description ==
It is similar to Xylophanes loelia and Xylophanes libya but has a deeper red coloration of the median band of the hindwing upperside. The mesothorax and metathorax have a pale grey medial band that continues onto the abdomen as a pair of thin lines, enclosing a darker olive-green or brown median line. The first and fourth postmedian lines on the forewings is narrow and continuous from the inner margin to the apex. The area between these lines is yellow, contrasting with the pinkish coloration of the rest of the wing. There is a black subapical dot which is generally very small. The median band on the hindwing upperside is bright red and relatively broad, tapering towards and reaching or almost reaching the costa.

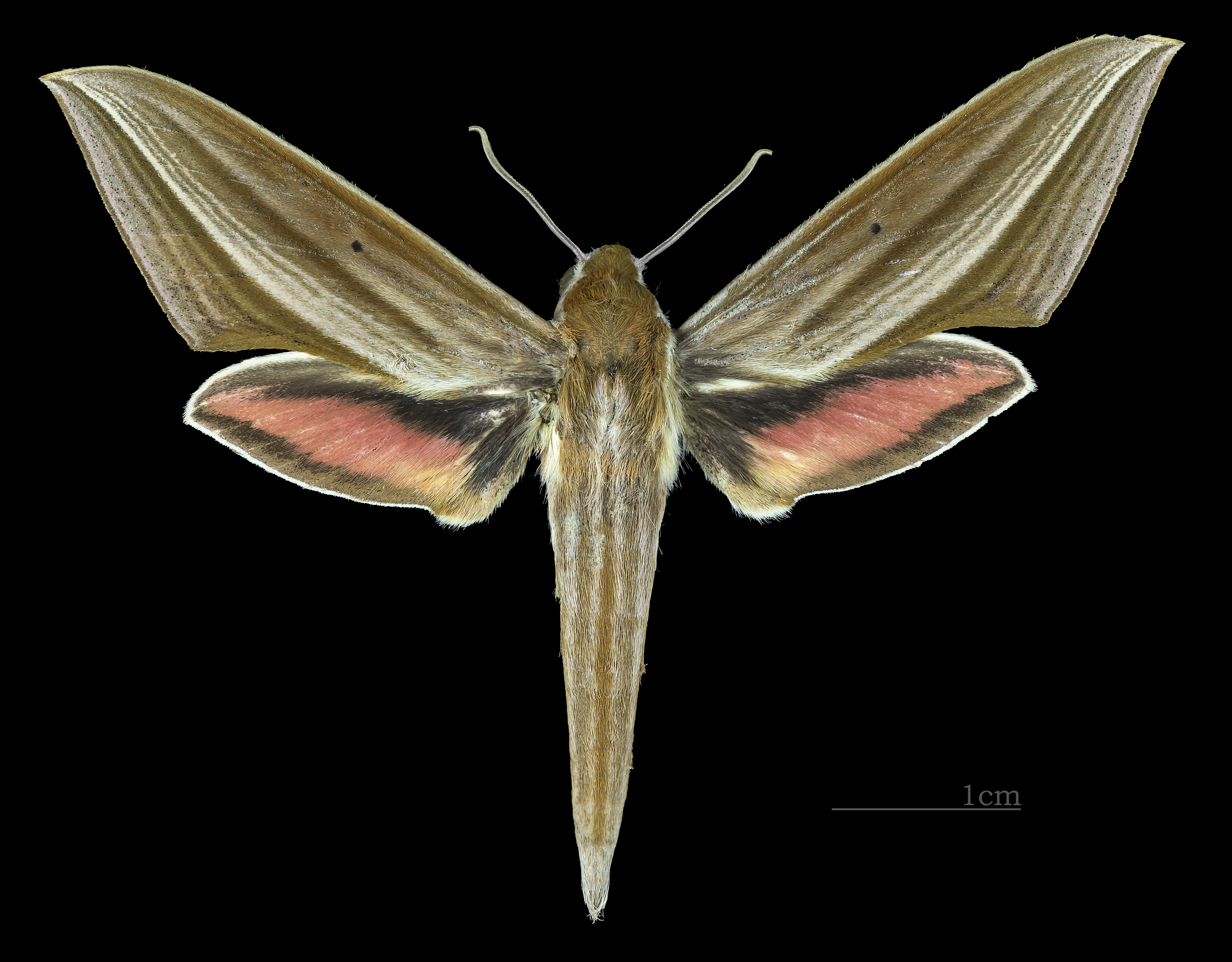
Female dorsal
(coll.MHNT)

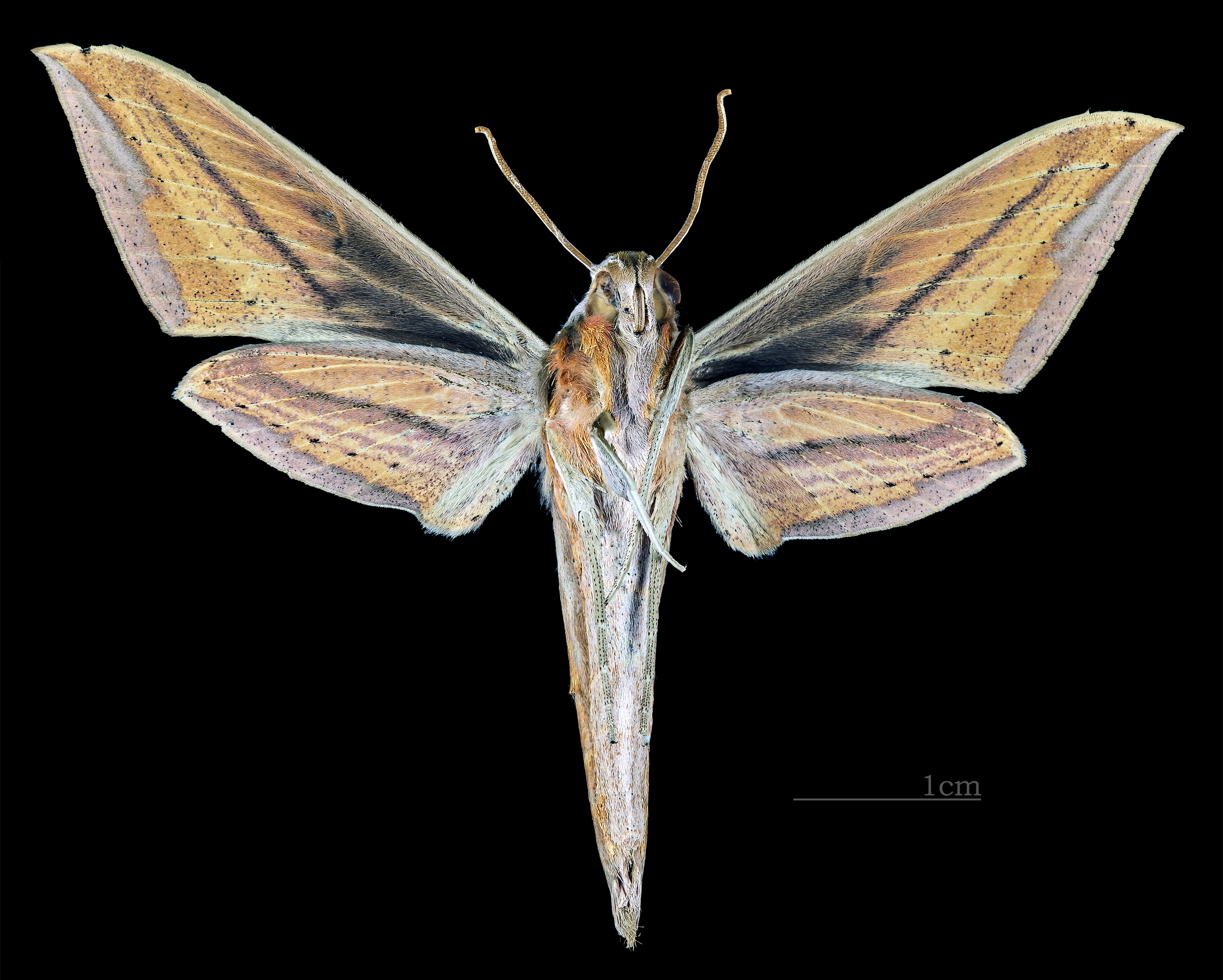
Female ventral
(coll.MHNT)

== Biology ==
Adults are probably on wing year-round.
