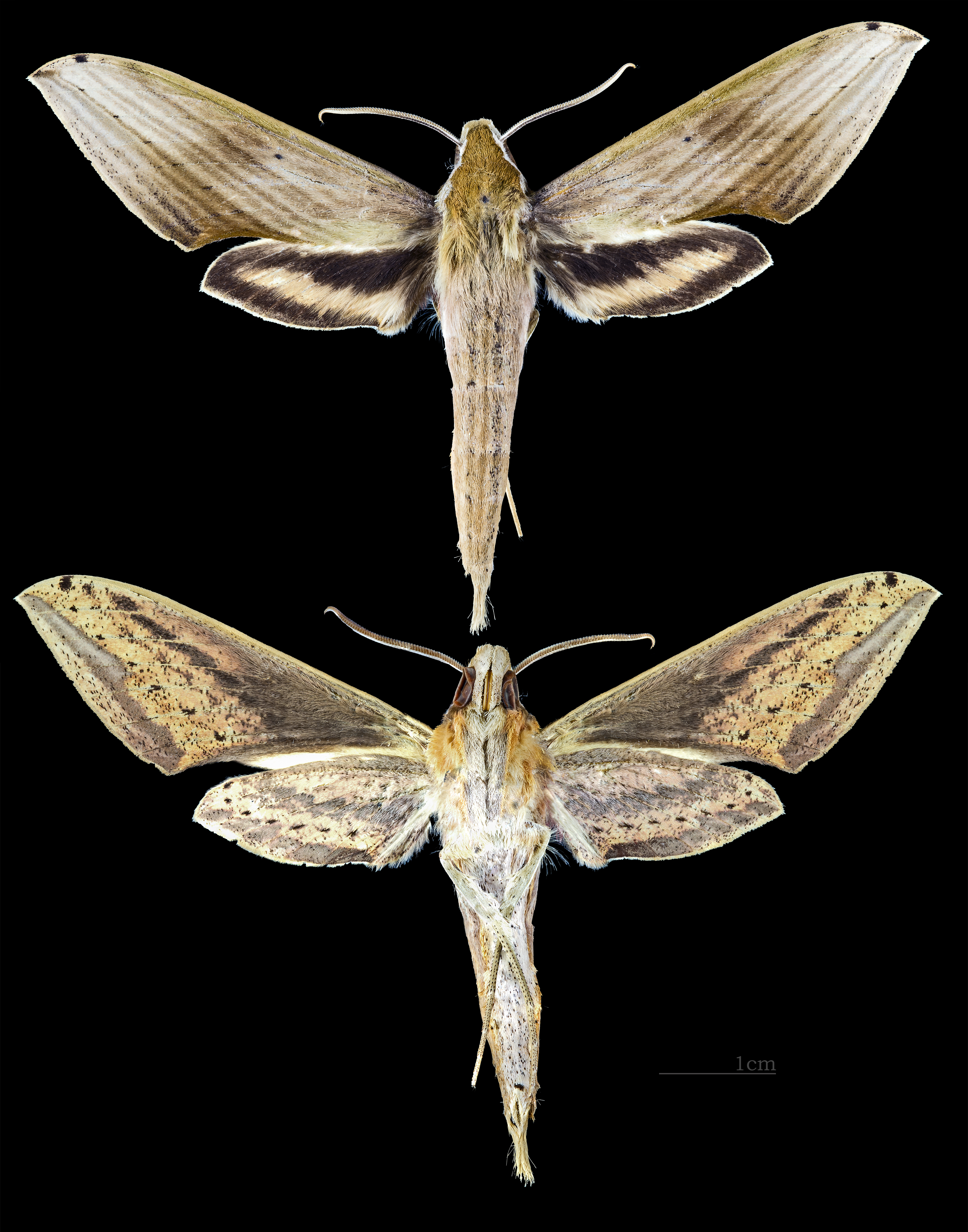

Scientific classification
- Domain: Eukaryota
- Kingdom: Animalia
- Phylum: Arthropoda
- Class: Insecta
- Order: Lepidoptera
- Family: Sphingidae
- Genus: Xylophanes
- Species: X. libya

Binomial name
- Xylophanes libya (H. Druce, 1878)

Synonyms
- Choerocampa libya H. Druce, 1878; Xylophanus pallescens Closs, 1917

= Xylophanes libya =

Libya sphinx

Species of moth

Xylophanes libya, the Libya sphinx, is a moth of the family Sphingidae. The species was first described by Herbert Druce in 1878. It is known from southern Texas, Mexico, Belize, Guatemala, Panama and from Venezuela south and west to Bolivia and Paraguay.

== Description ==
The wingspan is 68–74 mm.

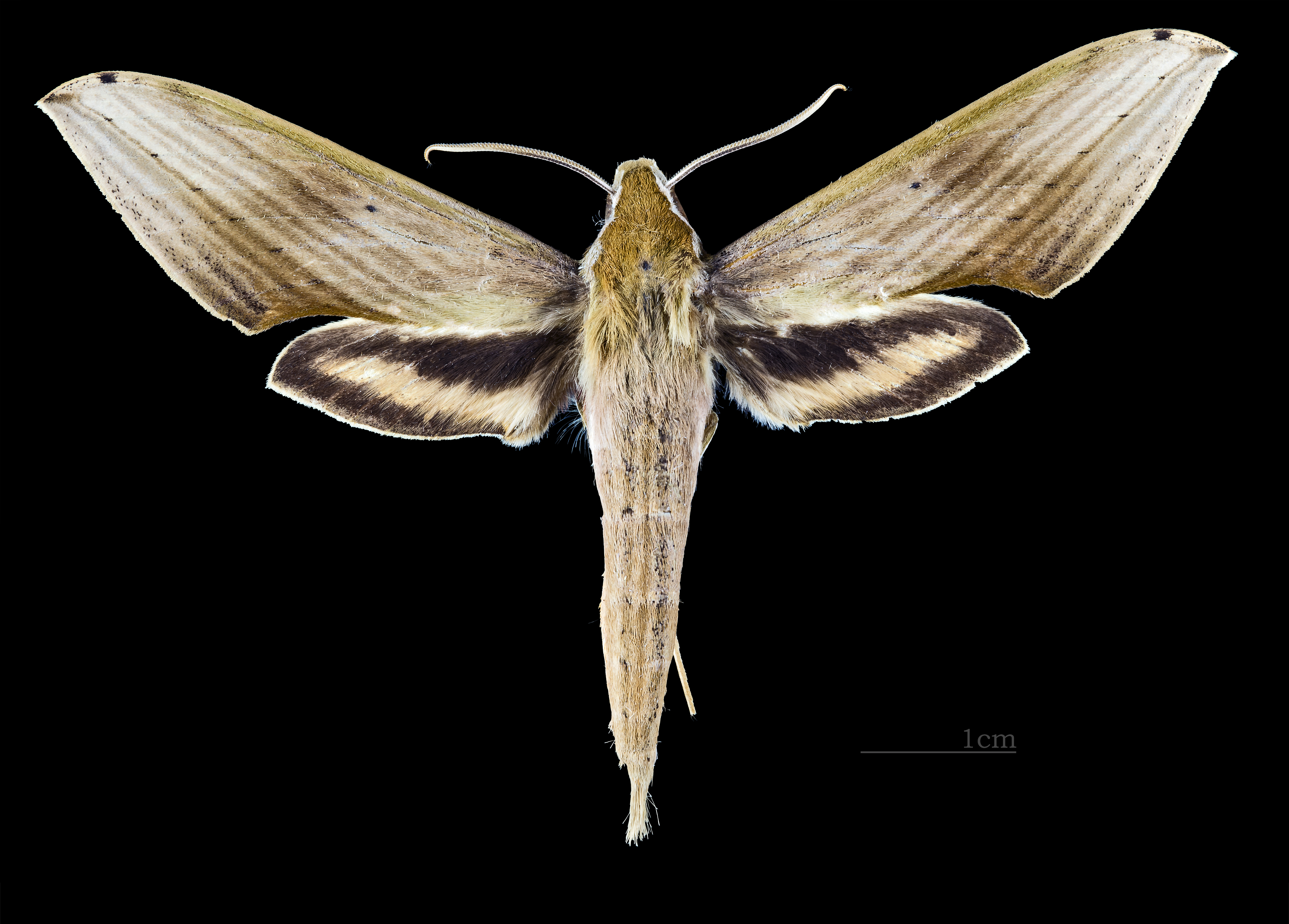
Female

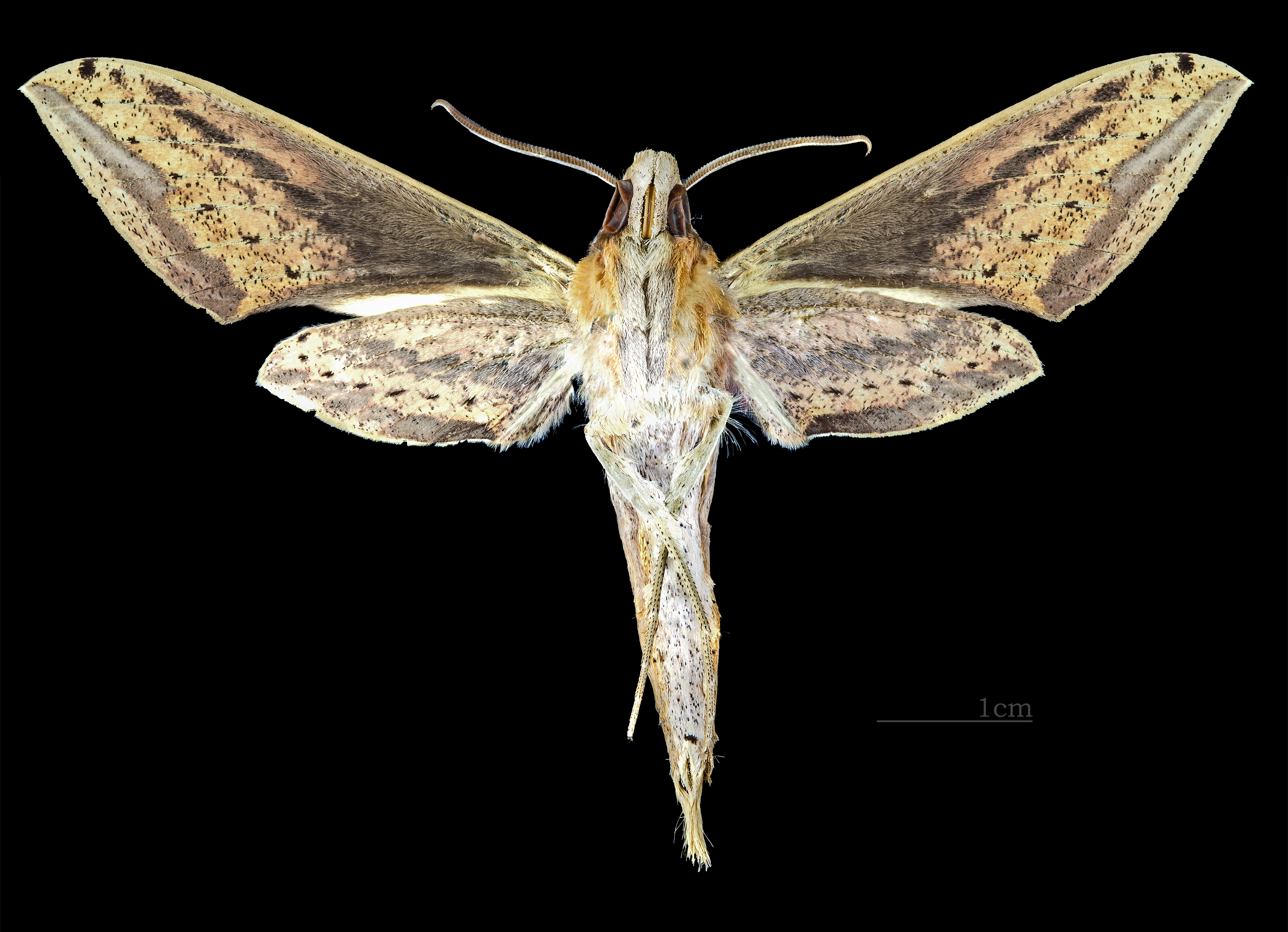
Female underside

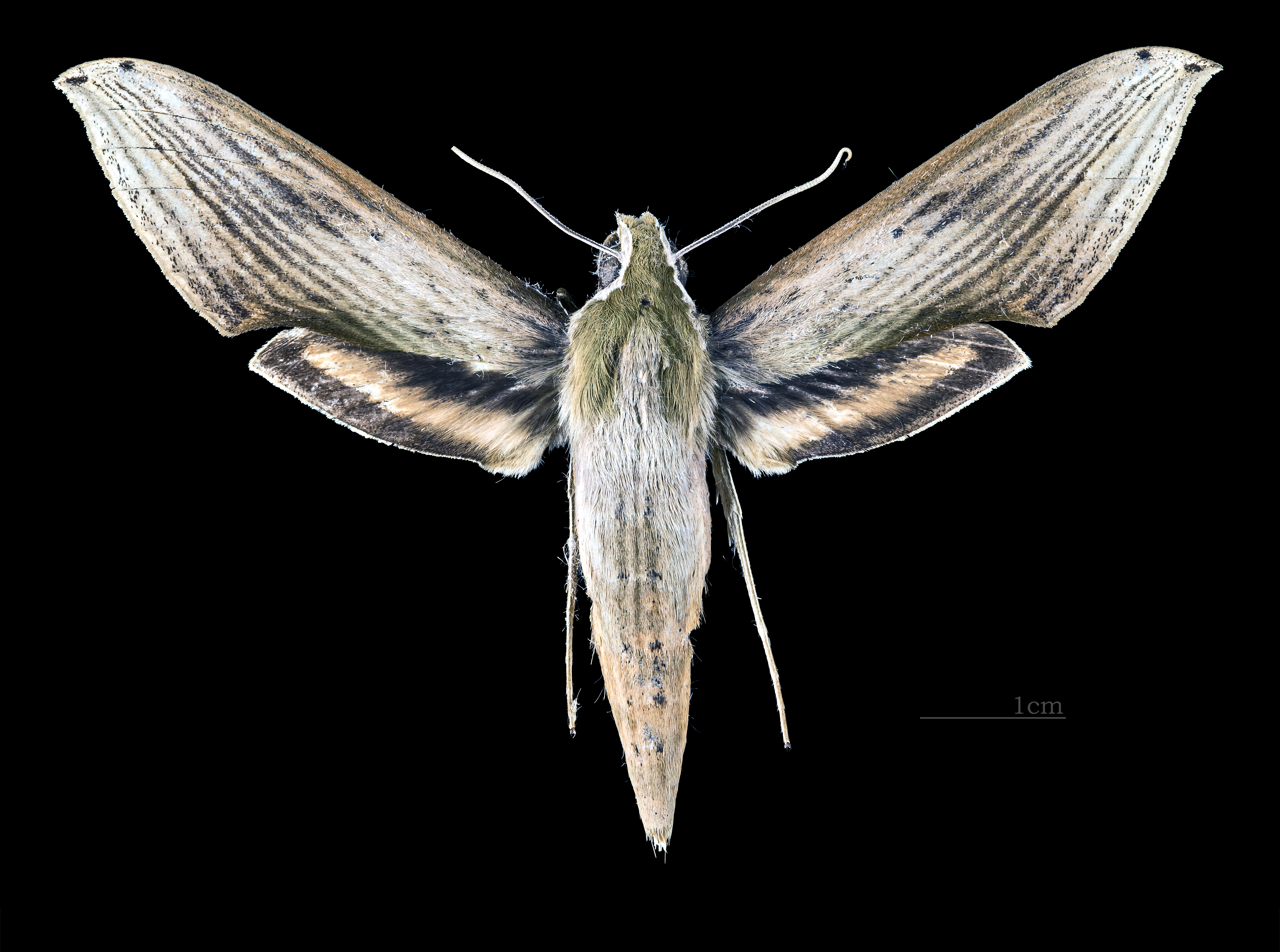
Male

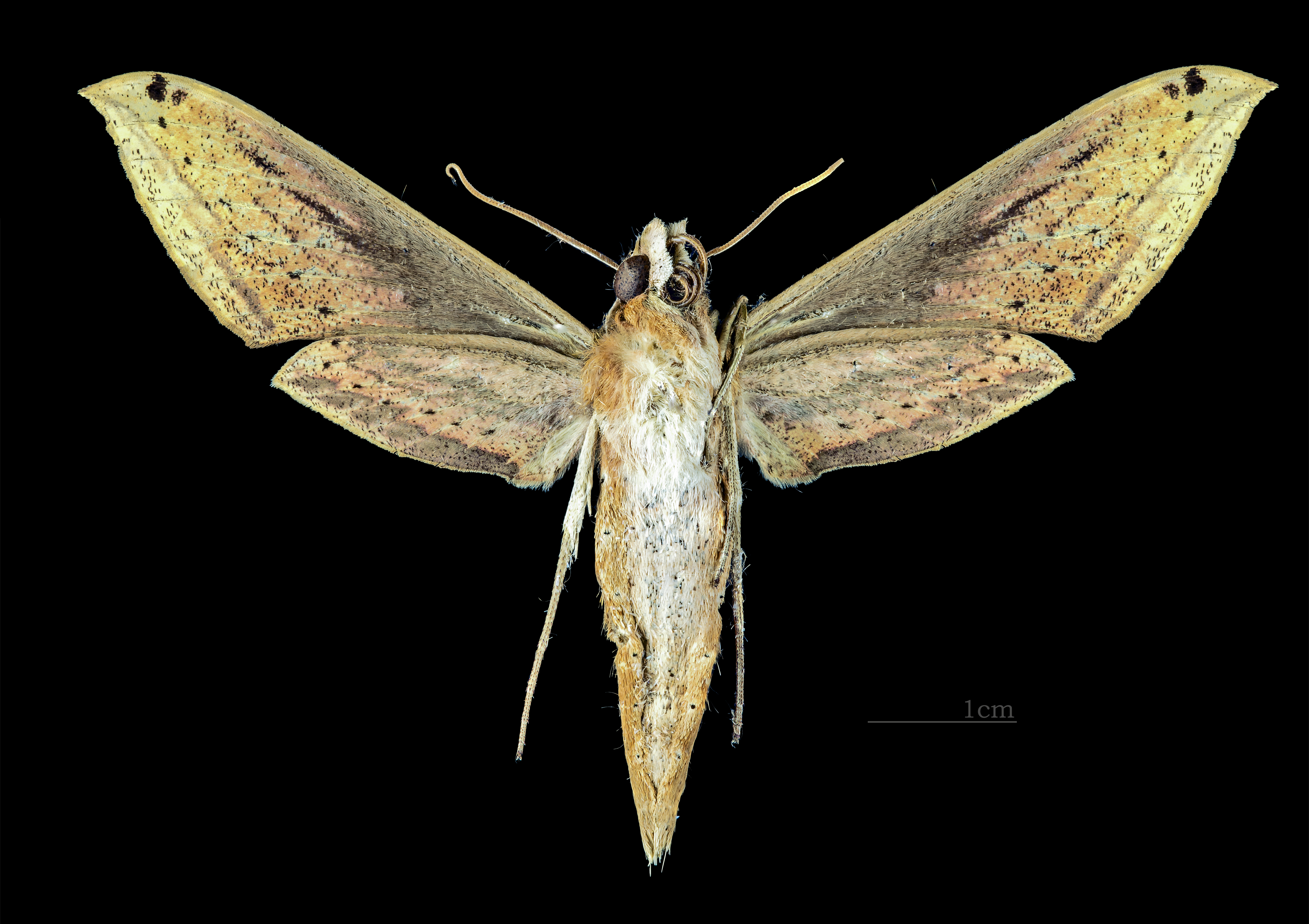
Male underside

== Biology ==
Adults are probably on wing year round in part of the range. In southern Texas, adults are on wing in October and in Bolivia in April.

The larvae feed on Psychotria horizontalis, Psychotria nervosa and Psychotria microdon.
