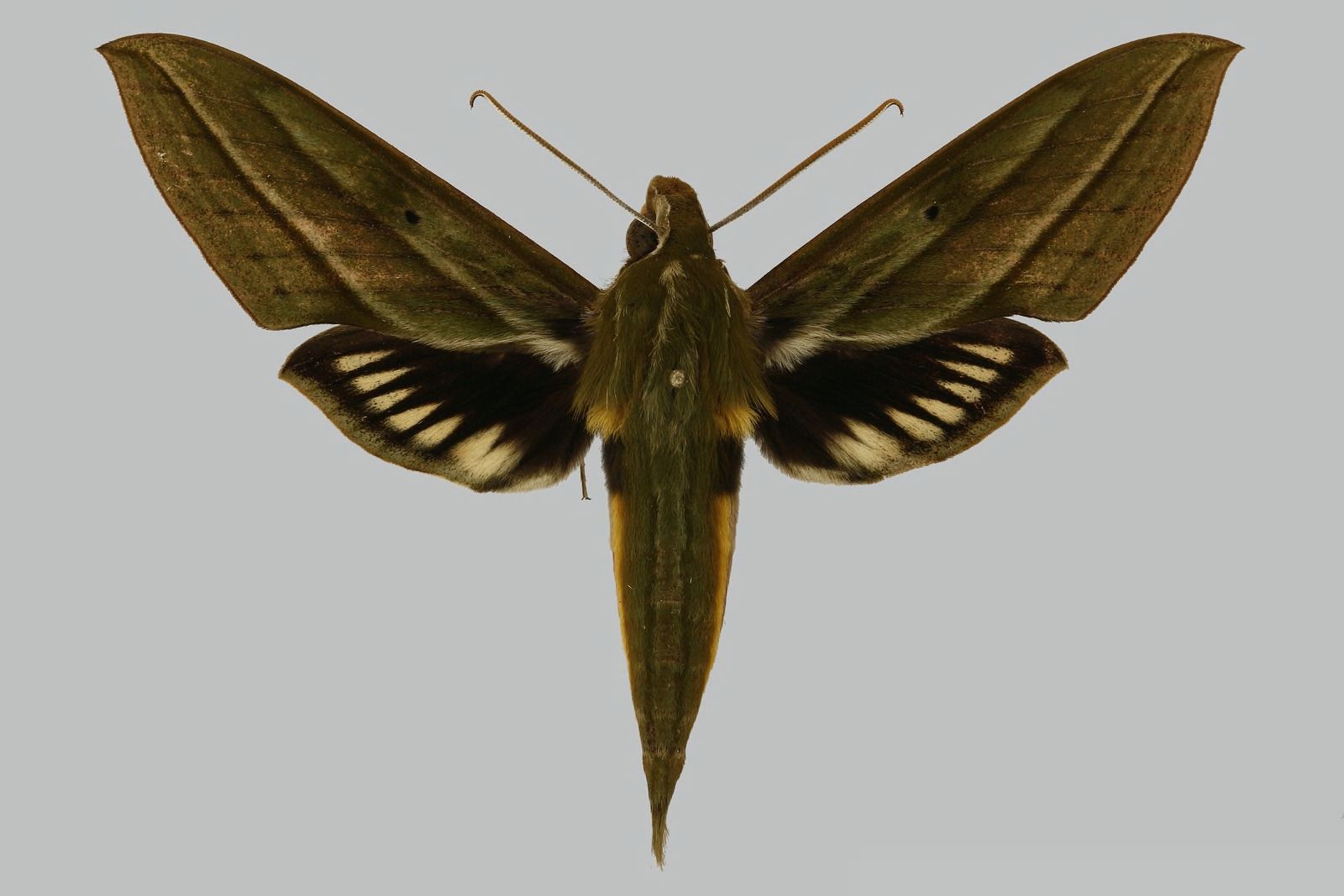

Scientific classification
- Domain: Eukaryota
- Kingdom: Animalia
- Phylum: Arthropoda
- Class: Insecta
- Order: Lepidoptera
- Family: Sphingidae
- Genus: Xylophanes
- Species: X. vagliai

Binomial name
- Xylophanes vagliai Haxaire, 2003

= Xylophanes vagliai =

Species of moth

Xylophanes vagliai is a moth of the family Sphingidae. It is known from Ecuador.

The wingspan is 95–100 millimetres (3.7–3.9 in). It is similar to Xylophanes aristor and Xylophanes rhodochlora.

There are probably at least two generations per year.
