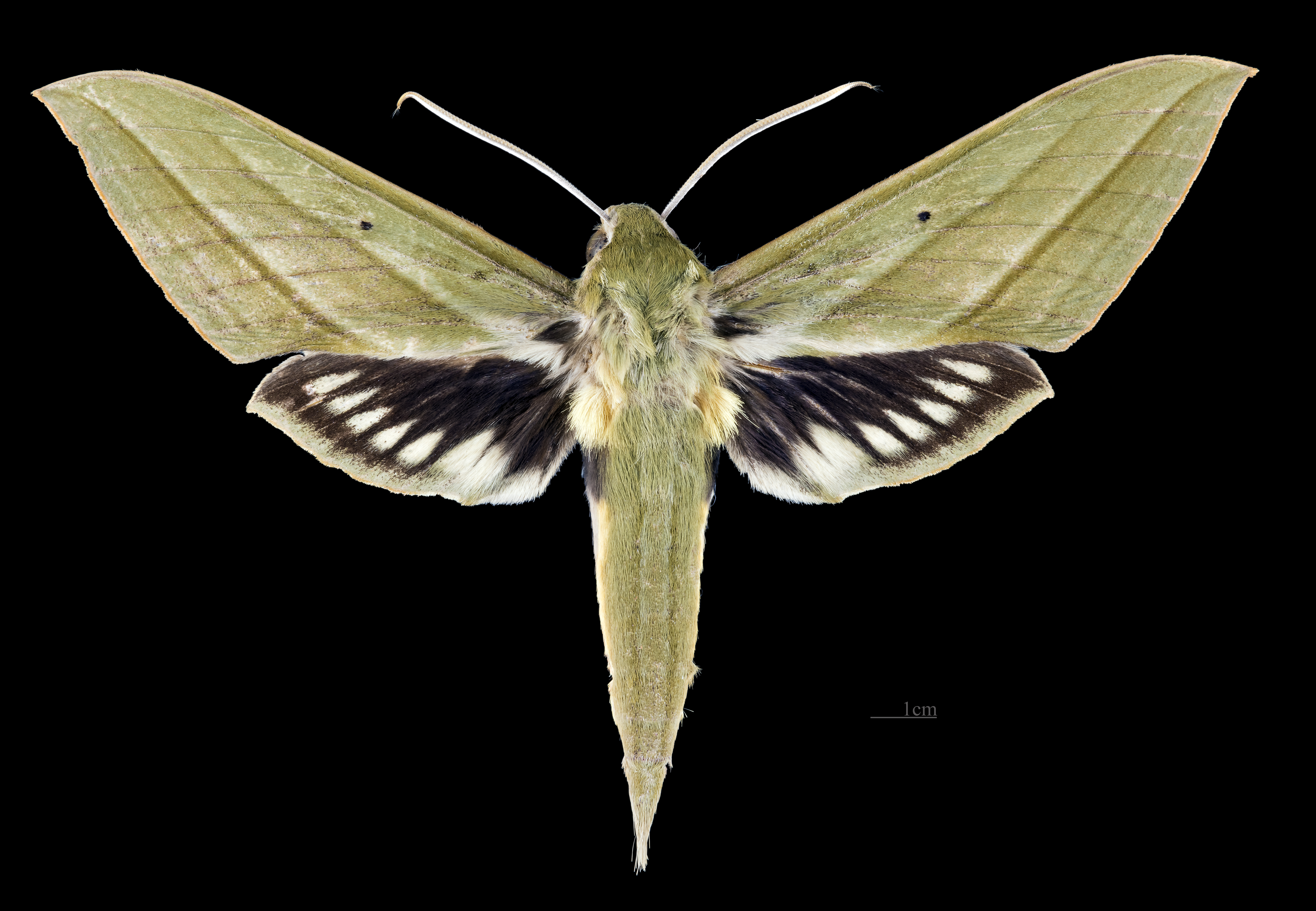
- Xylophanes rhodochlora Male dorsal
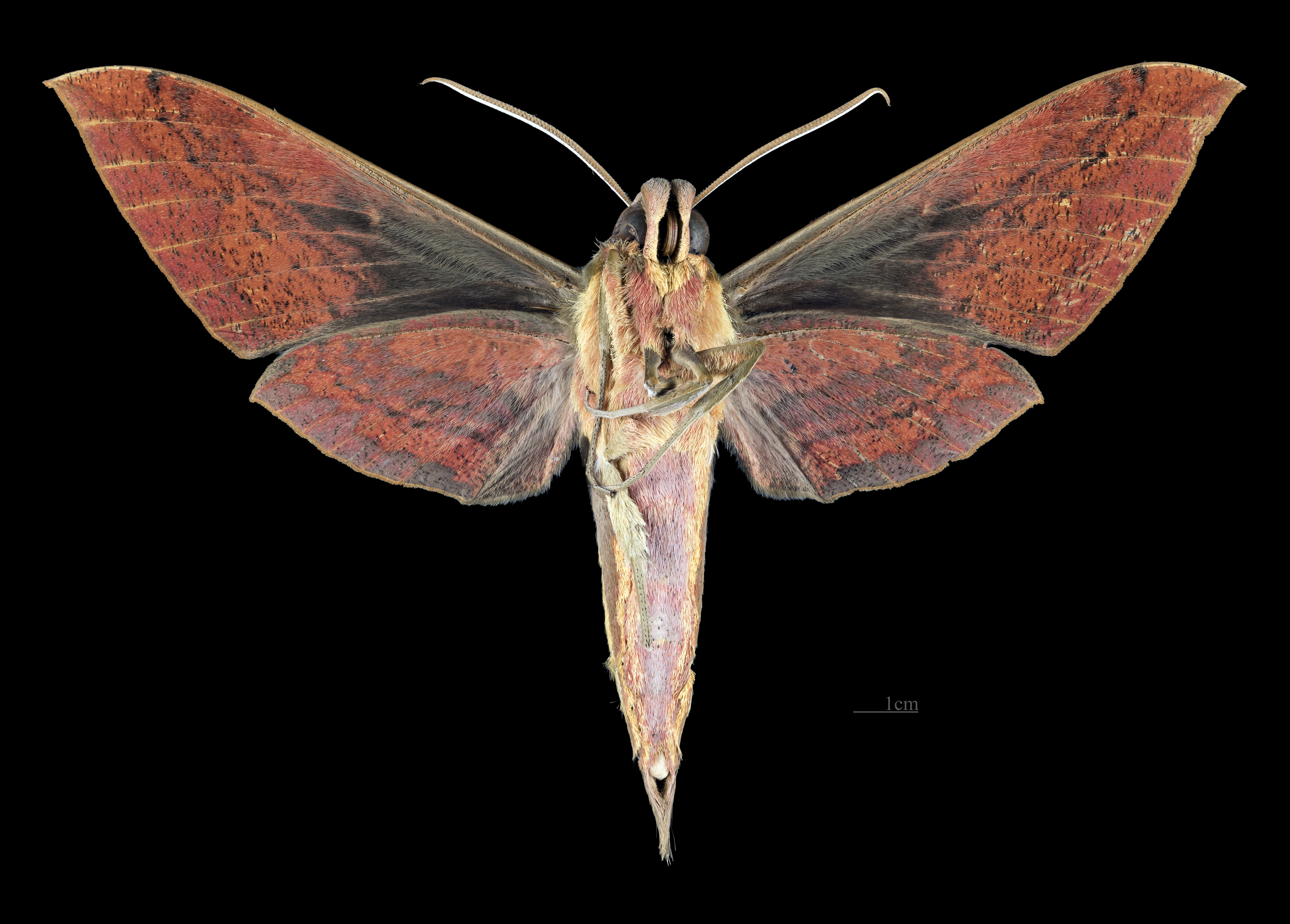
- Xylophanes rhodochlora Male ventral

Scientific classification
- Domain: Eukaryota
- Kingdom: Animalia
- Phylum: Arthropoda
- Class: Insecta
- Order: Lepidoptera
- Family: Sphingidae
- Genus: Xylophanes
- Species: X. rhodochlora

Binomial name
- Xylophanes rhodochlora Rothschild & Jordan, 1903

= Xylophanes rhodochlora =

Species of moth

Xylophanes rhodochlora is a moth of the family Sphingidae. It is found in Peru, Bolivia and possibly Colombia.

It is similar to Xylophanes crotonis except for the forewing, which is smaller, shorter and broader. Although it is also green, it is considerably brighter. Furthermore, the pattern found on the forewing is simpler. There is a grey dorsal line on the thorax as well as a yellow lateral stripe. The underside of the abdomen is pink.

Adults are on wing in November in Peru.

The larvae probably feed on Rubiaceae and Malvaceae species.
