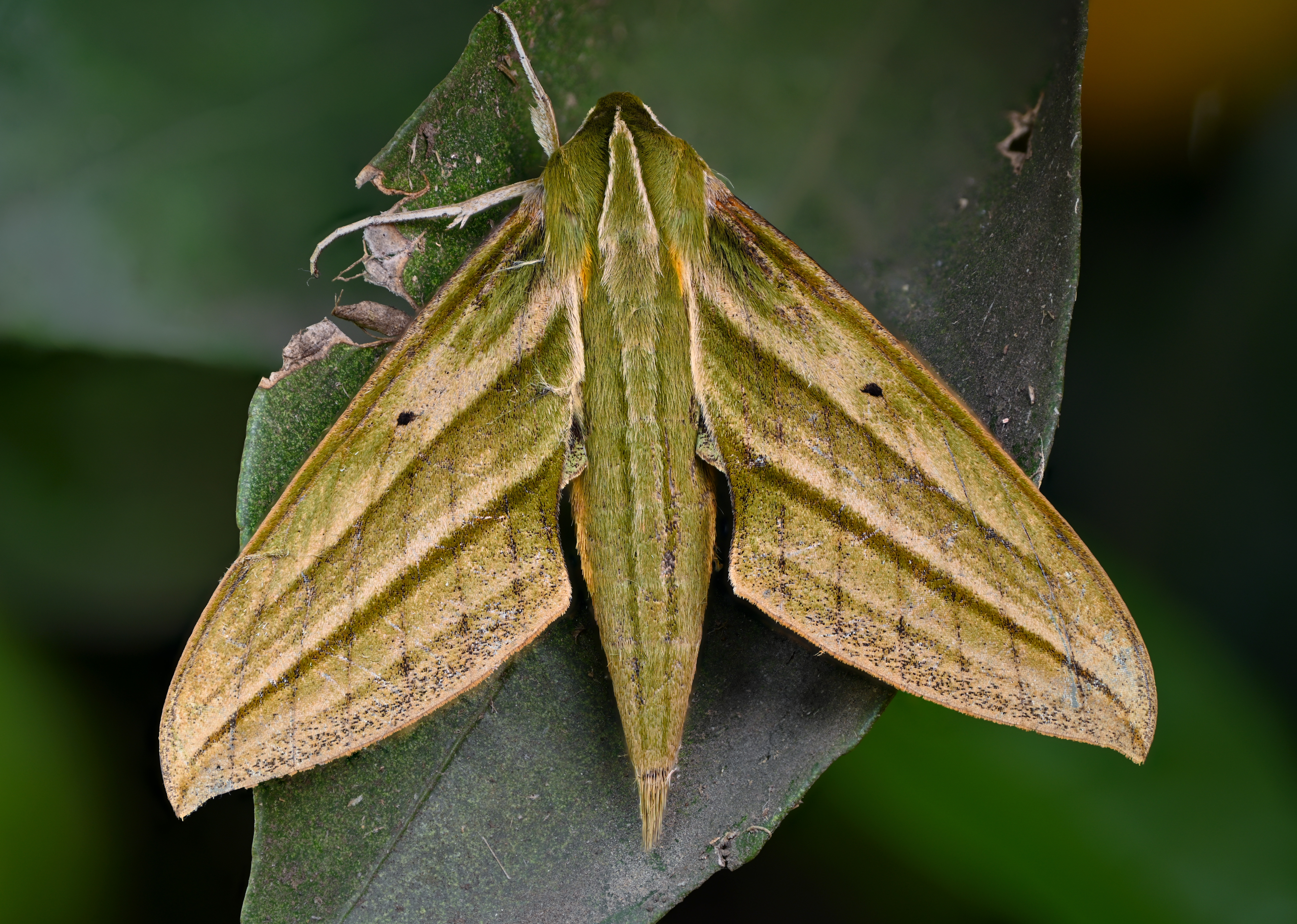
- Medellin, Colombia

Scientific classification
- Domain: Eukaryota
- Kingdom: Animalia
- Phylum: Arthropoda
- Class: Insecta
- Order: Lepidoptera
- Family: Sphingidae
- Genus: Xylophanes
- Species: X. crotonis

Binomial name
- Xylophanes crotonis (Walker, 1856)

Synonyms
- Chaerocampa crotonis Boisduval, 1870; Chaerocampa crotonis Walker, 1856

= Xylophanes crotonis =

Species of moth

Xylophanes crotonis is a moth of the family Sphingidae first described by Francis Walker in 1870.

== Distribution ==
It is found in Guatemala, Colombia, Venezuela and south to Bolivia.

== Description ==
The wingspan is 91–97 millimetres (3.6–3.8 in). the larvae are green, turquoise or purplish with yellow dots. They are without eyespots in the second instar.

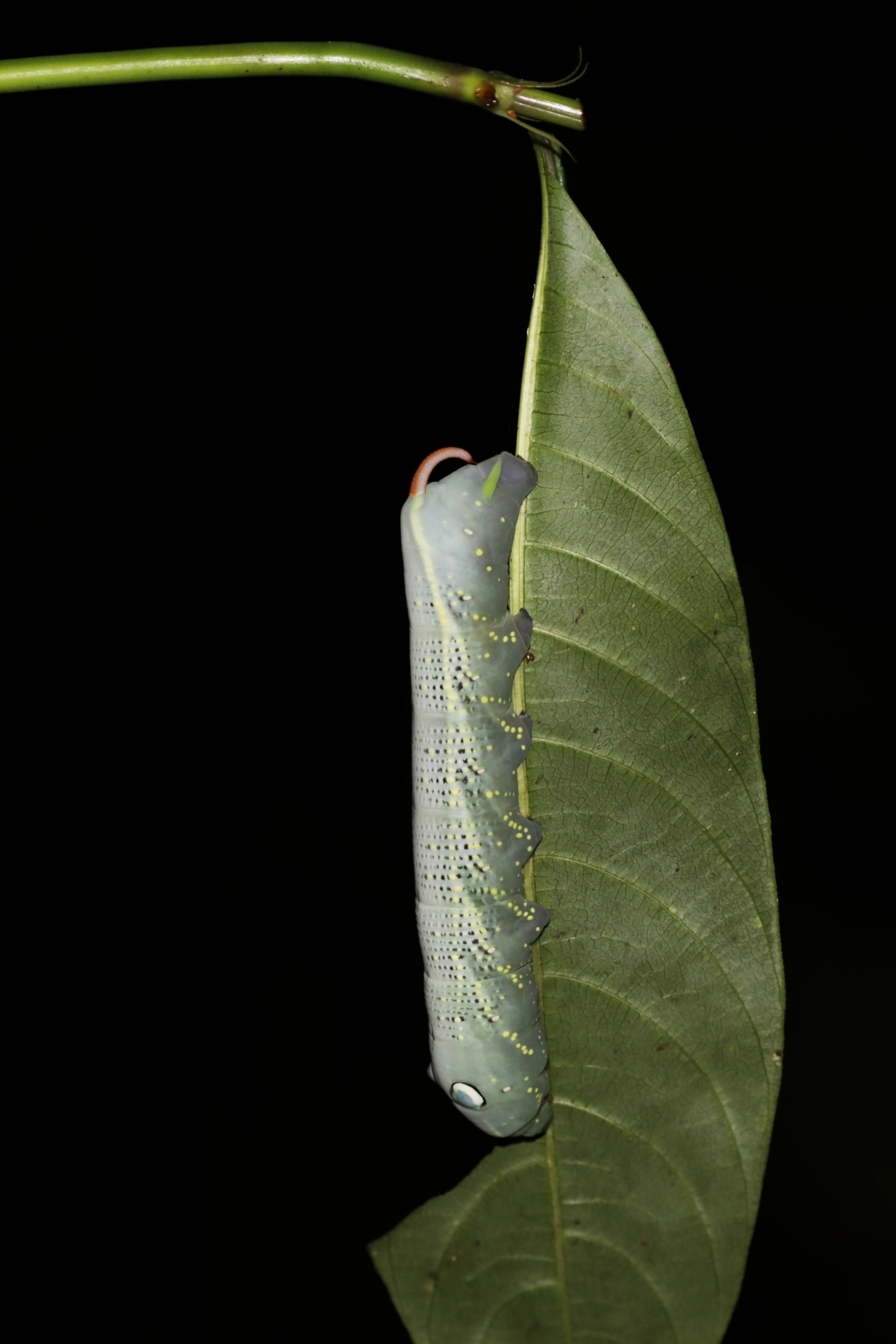
caterpillar

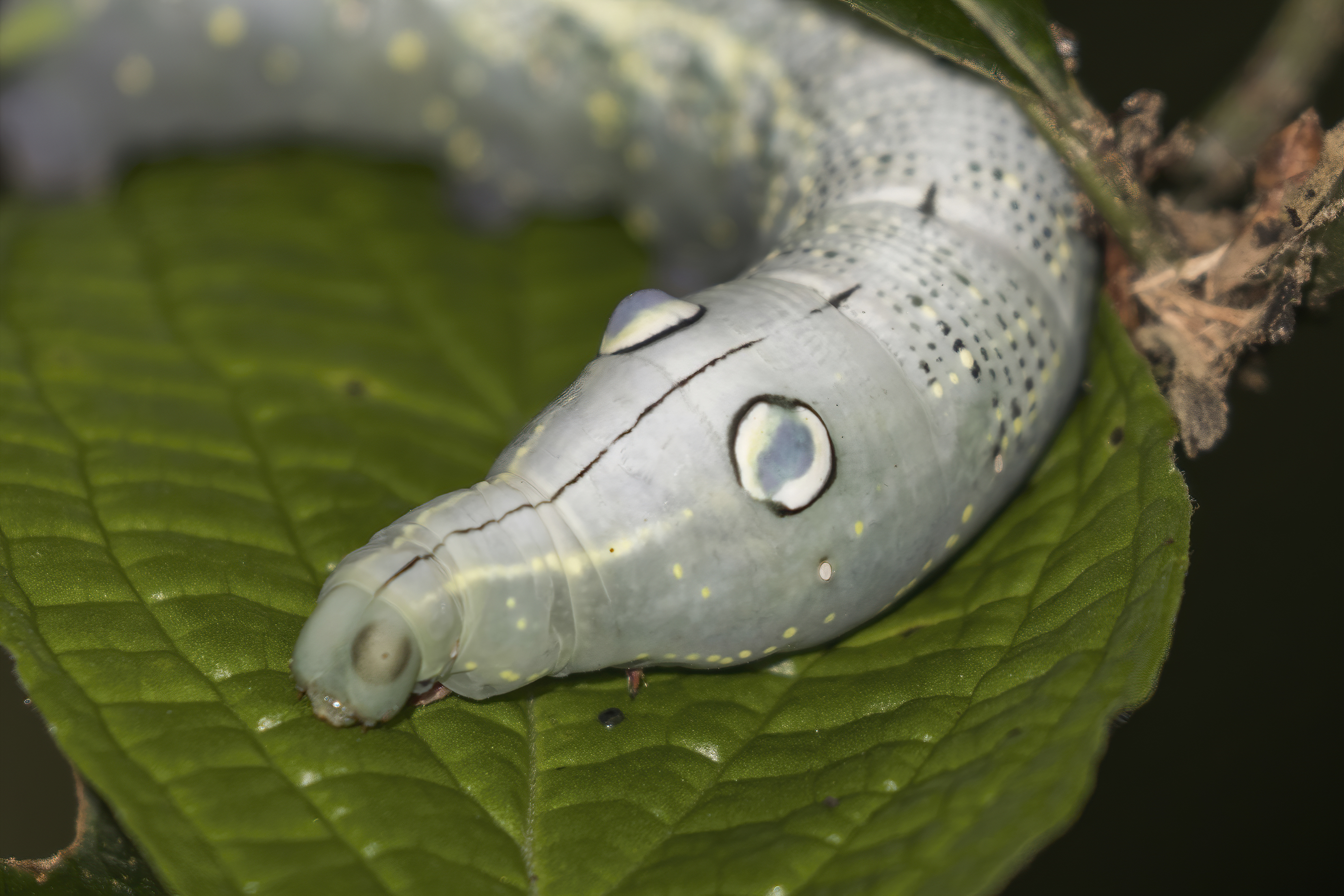
caterpillar

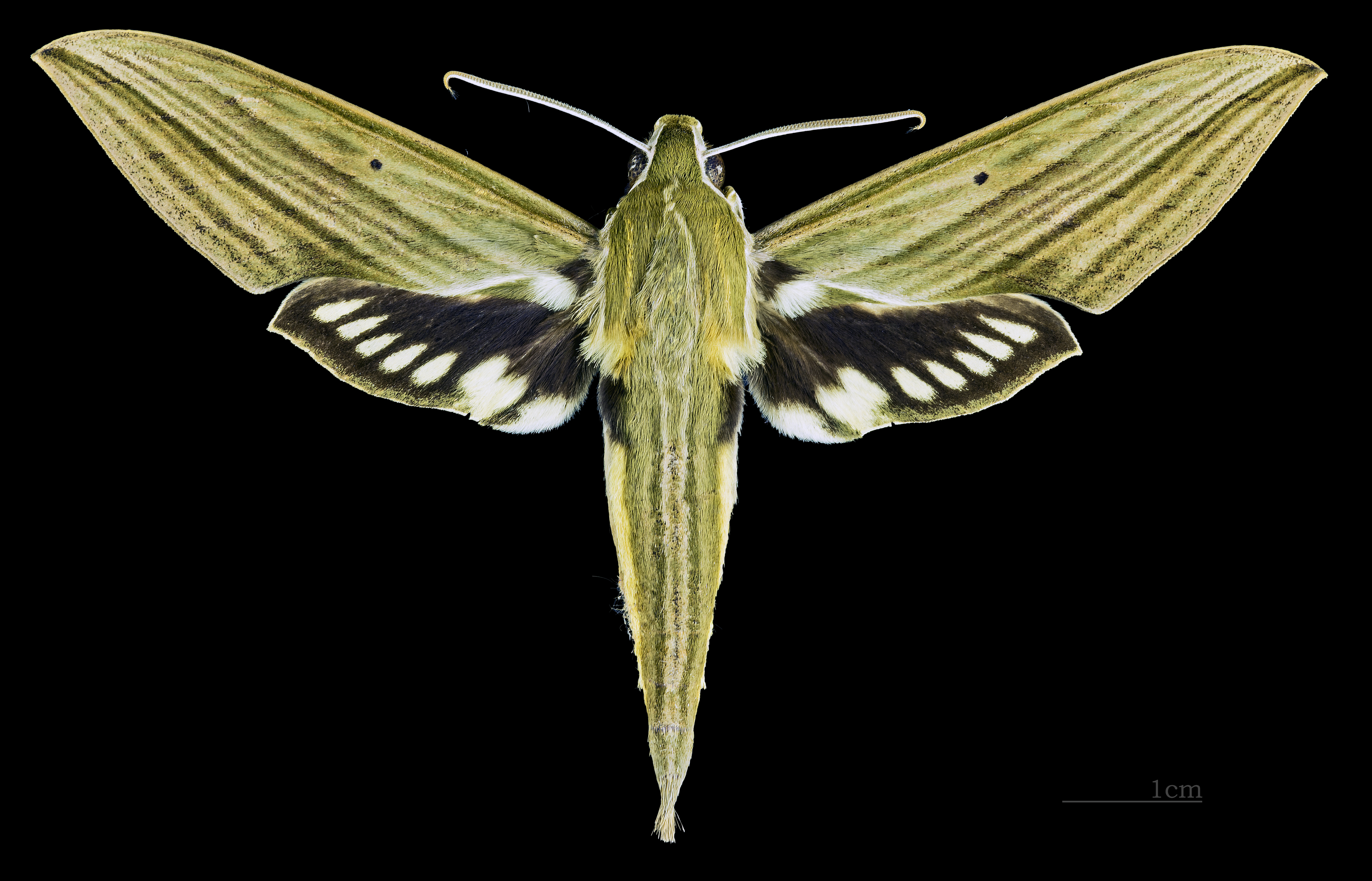
Male, dorsal view

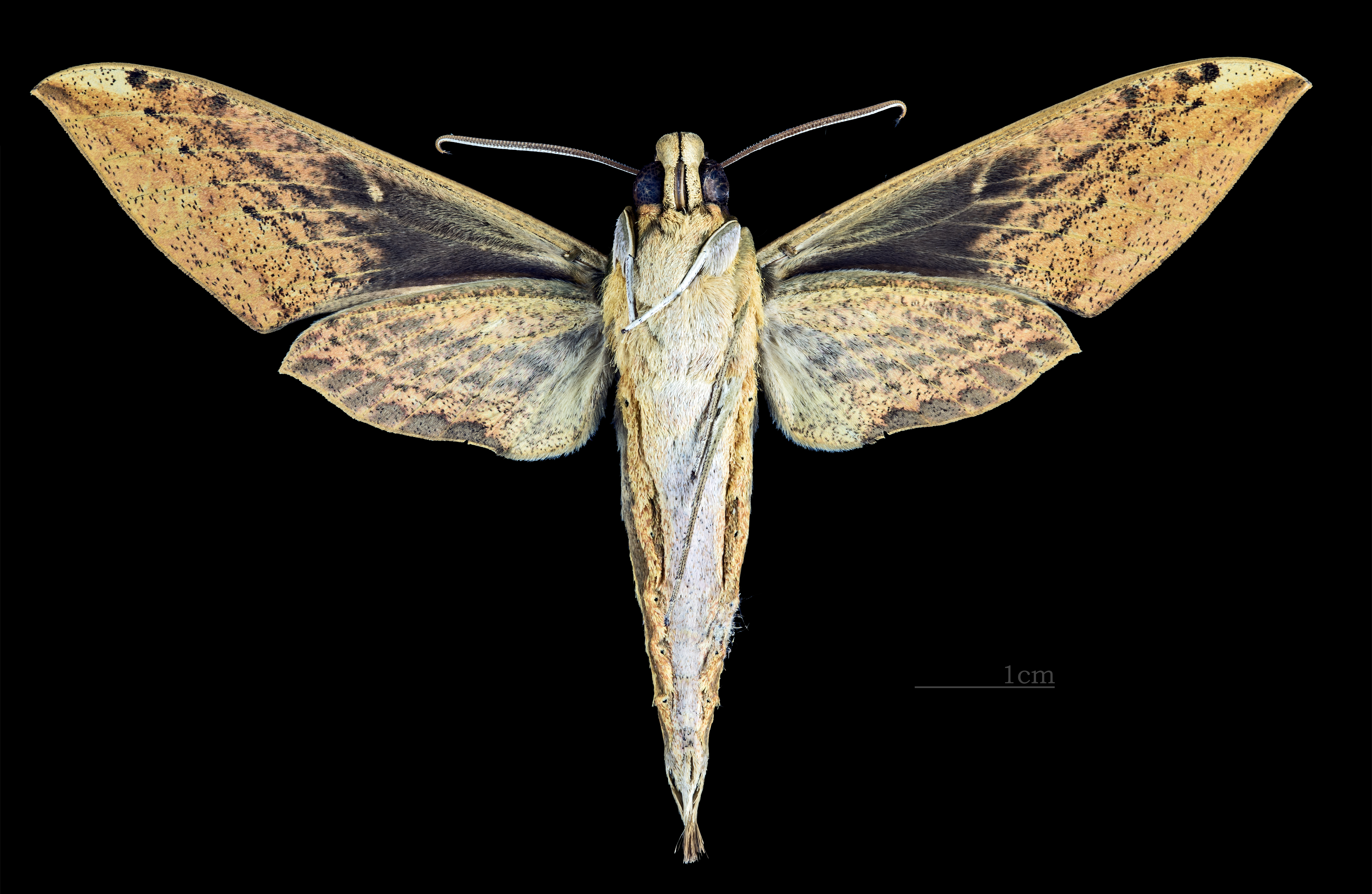
Male, ventral view

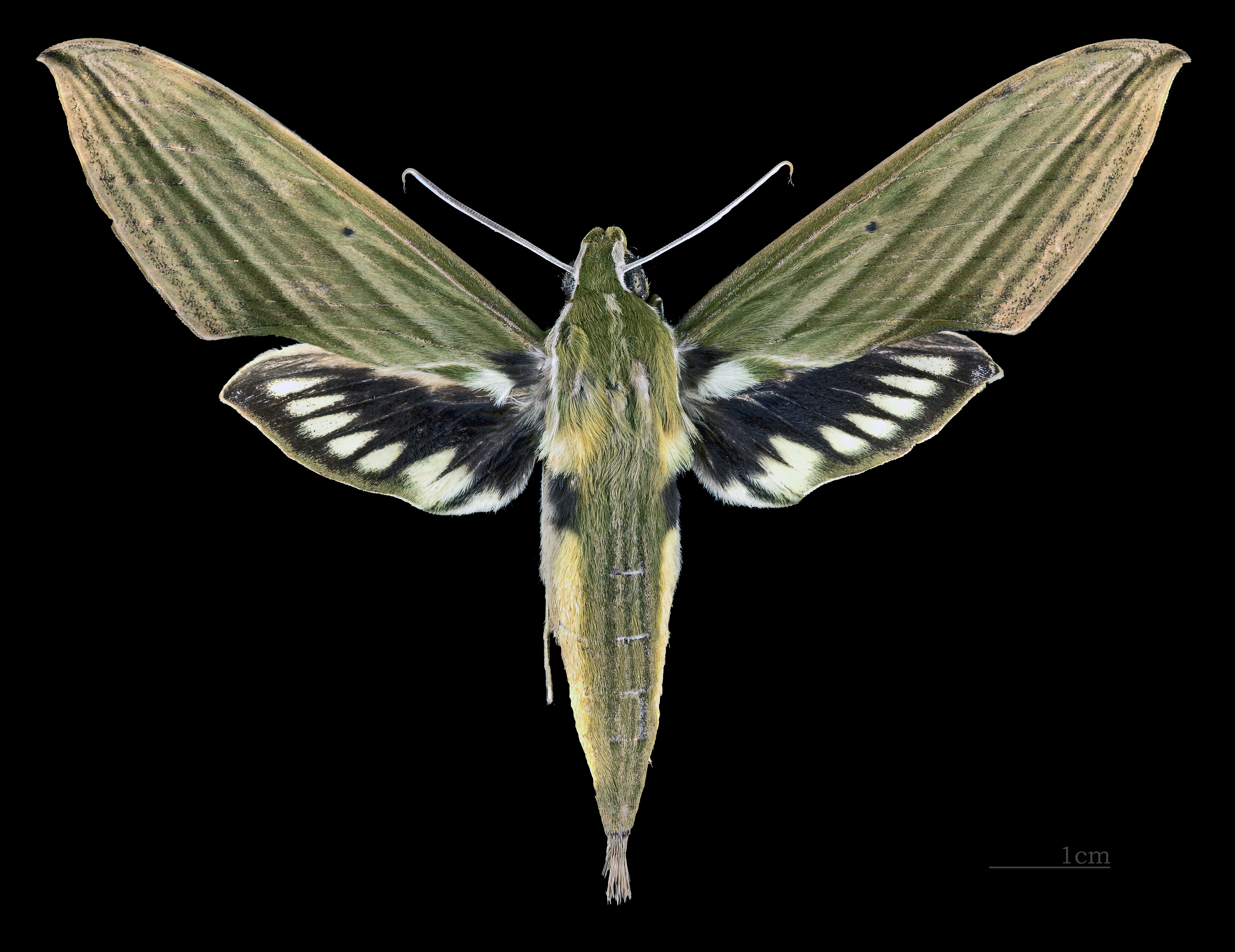
Female dorsal view

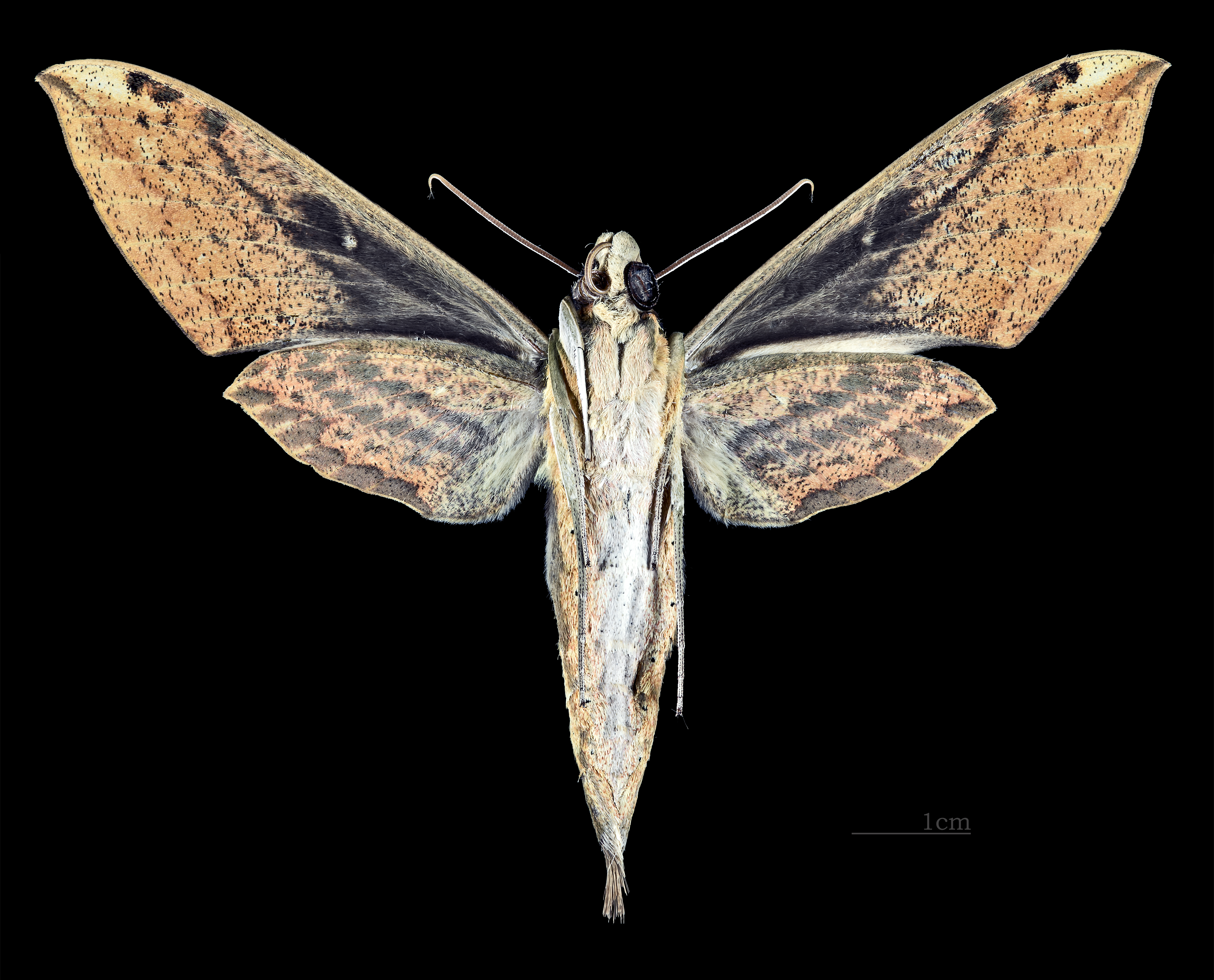
Female ventral view

== Biology ==
Adults are on wing year round in Costa Rica.

The larvae feed on Psychotria correae, Palicourea padifolia, Palicourea salicifolia, Coussarea austin-smithii, Coussarea caroliana and probably other Rubiaceae species. They have also been recorded on Rottboellia cochinchinensis.
