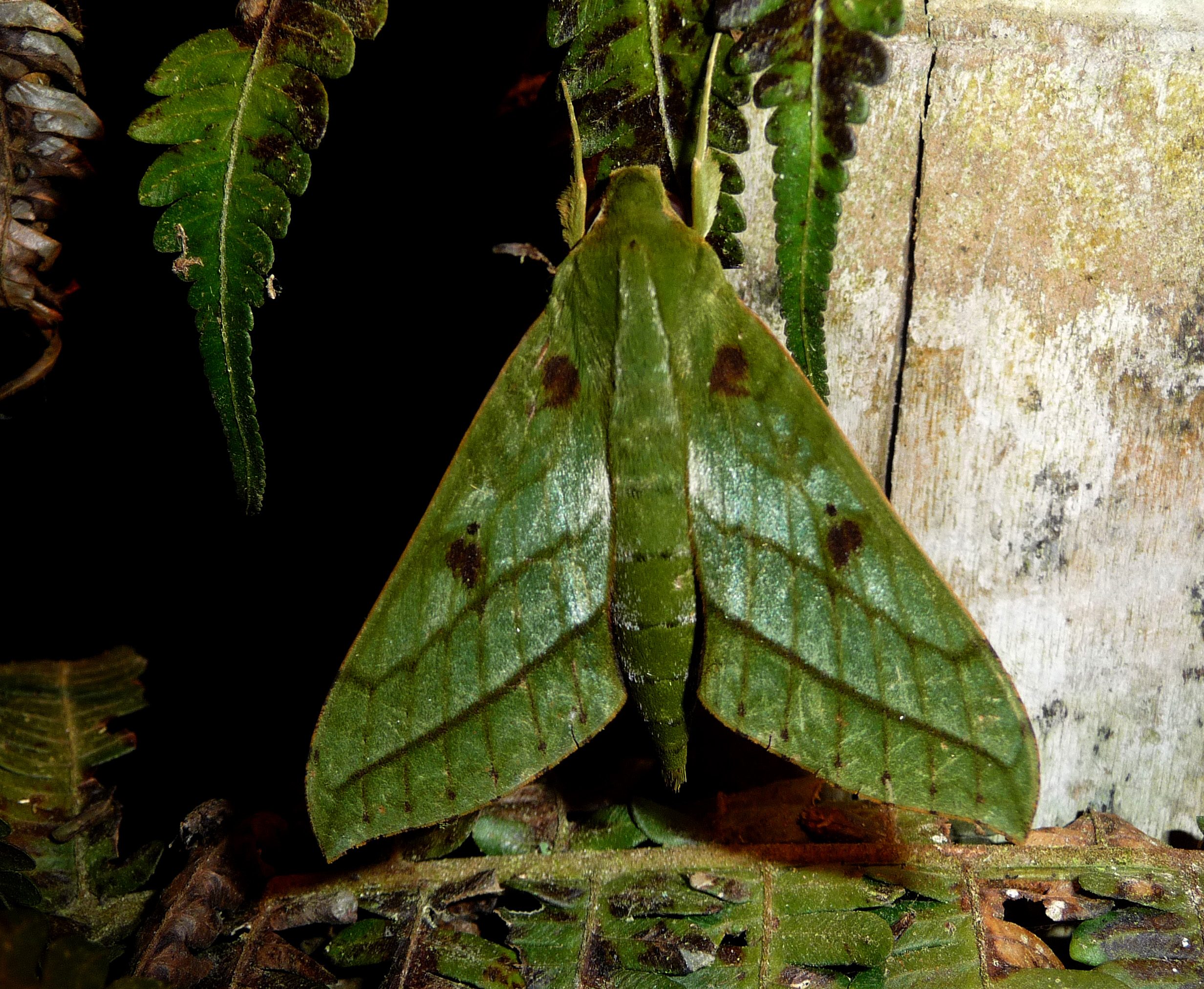

Scientific classification
- Domain: Eukaryota
- Kingdom: Animalia
- Phylum: Arthropoda
- Class: Insecta
- Order: Lepidoptera
- Family: Sphingidae
- Genus: Xylophanes
- Species: X. mirabilis

Binomial name
- Xylophanes mirabilis Clark, 1916

Synonyms
- Xylophanes venator Niepelt, 1927

= Xylophanes mirabilis =

Species of moth

Xylophanes mirabilis is a moth of the family Sphingidae. It is known from Colombia.

== Description ==
The wingspan is about 95 mm. It cannot be confused with any other Xylophanes Species, although it is superficially similar in shape and pattern to Xylophanes ploetzi. It is much larger and the ground colour is deep green (slightly fading to yellowish) with pale purple-grey irroration and a solid black discal spot. The pale median band is highlighted along the basal edge with small black spots on the veins.

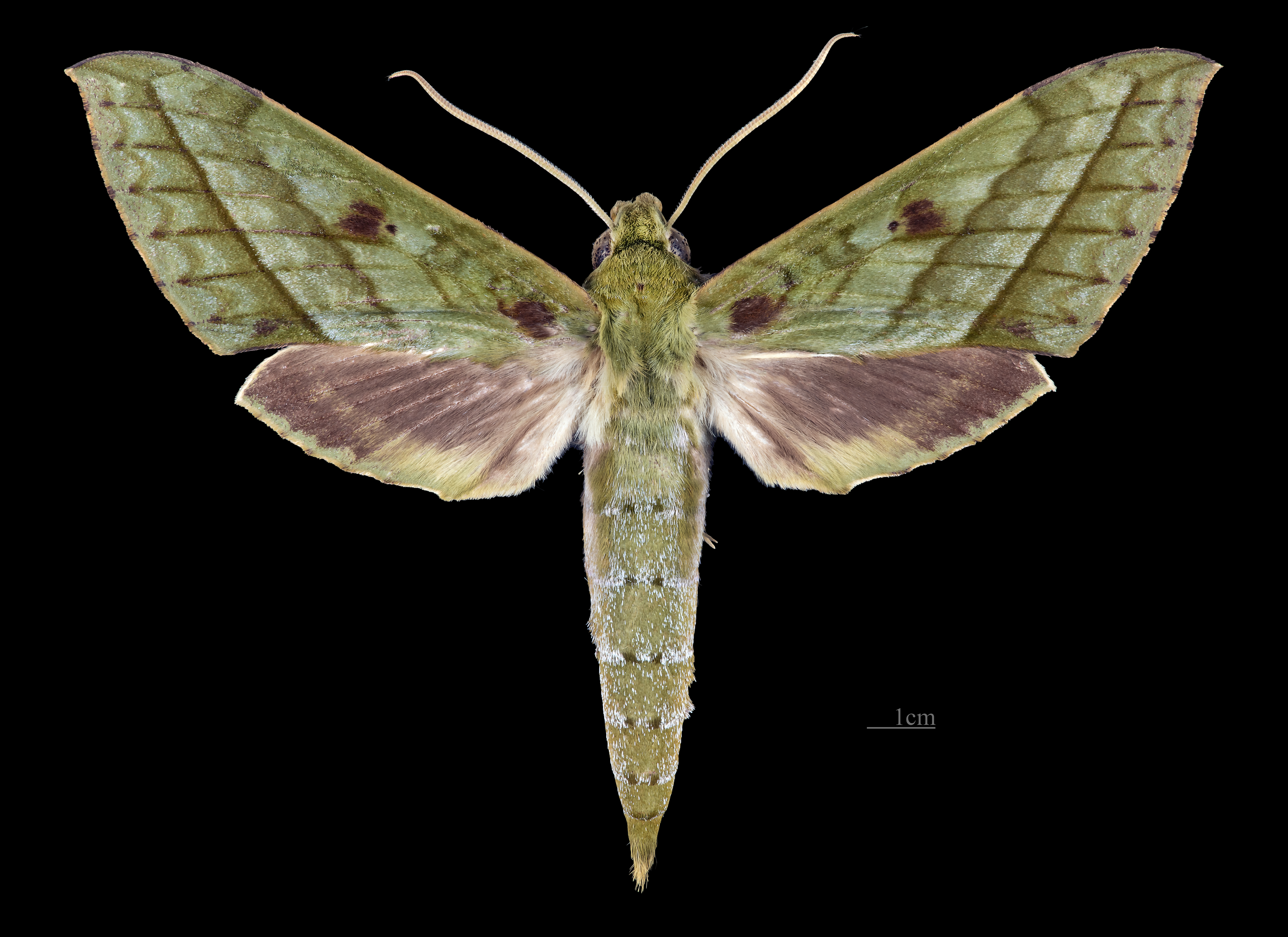
Male dorsal

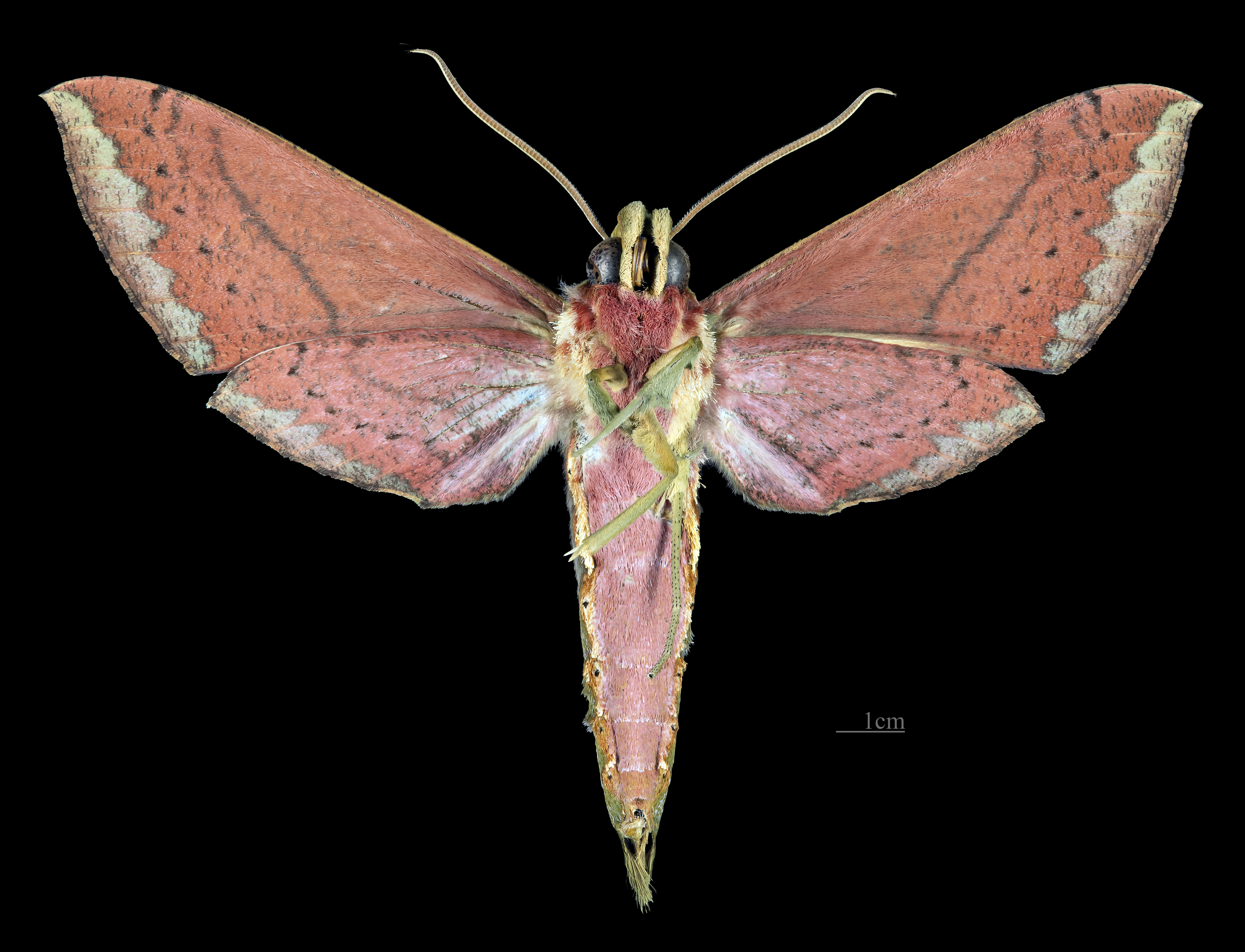
Male ventral

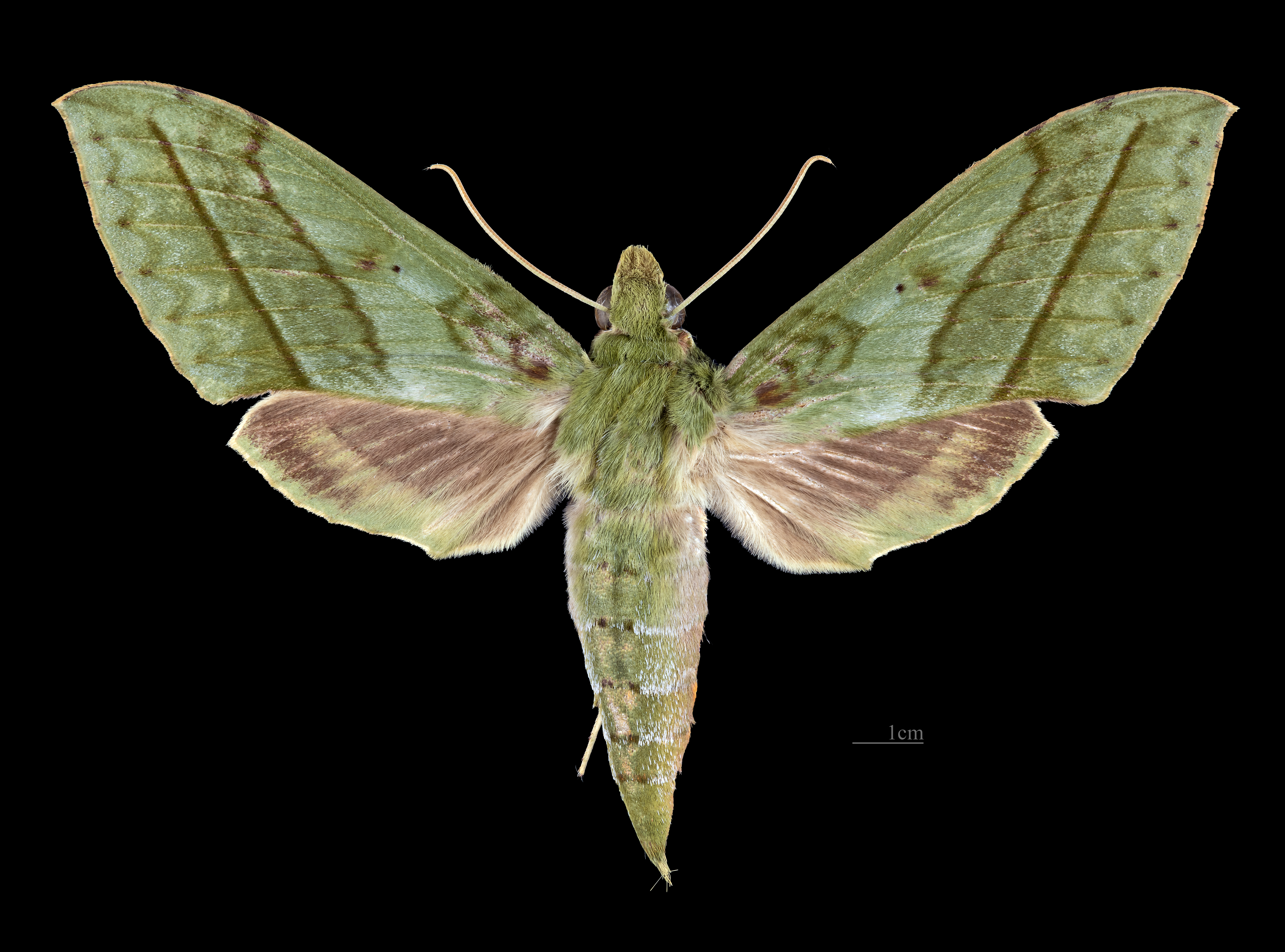
Female dorsal

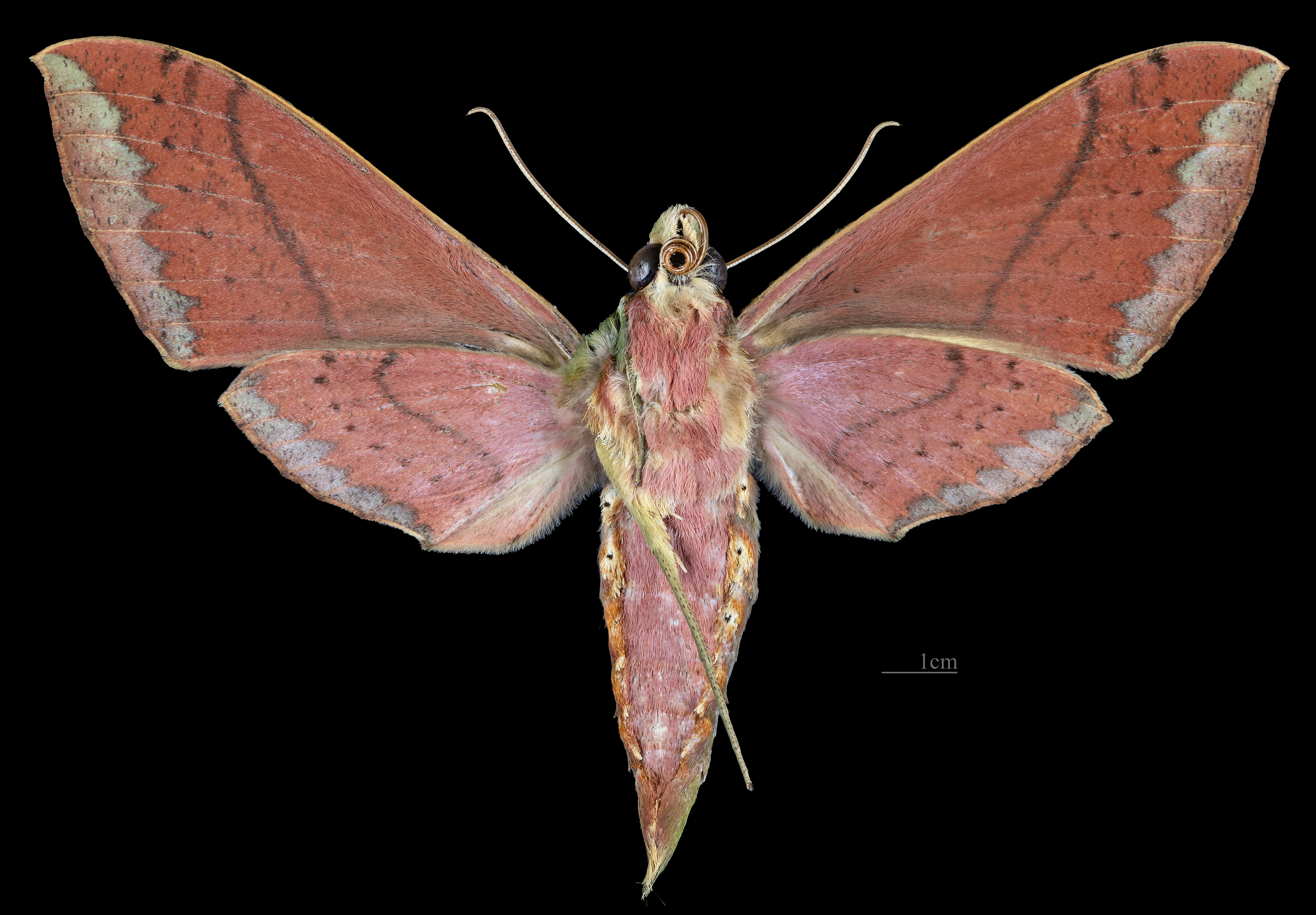
Female ventral

== Biology ==
The larvae probably feed on Rubiaceae and Malvaceae species.
