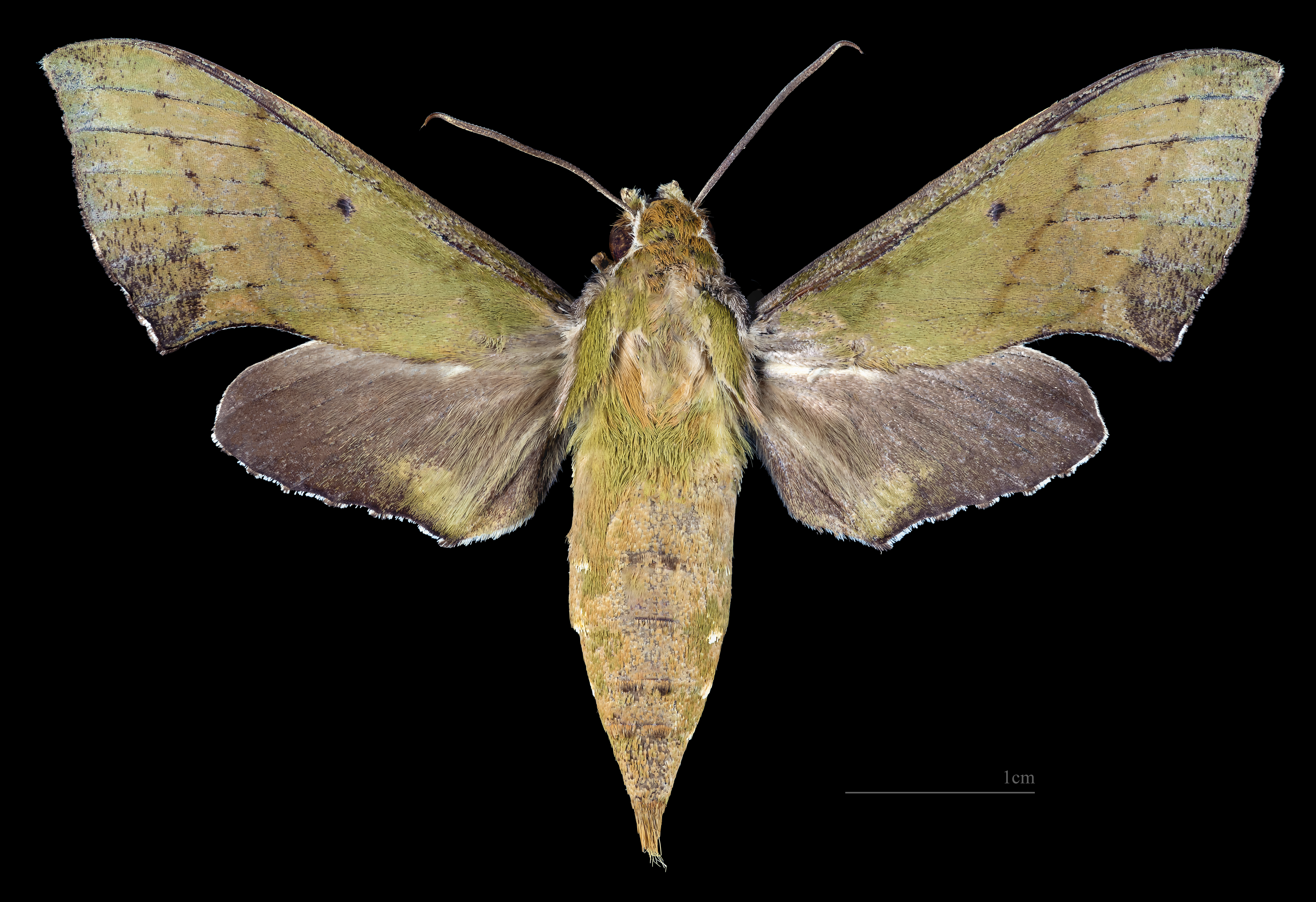
- Male dorsal
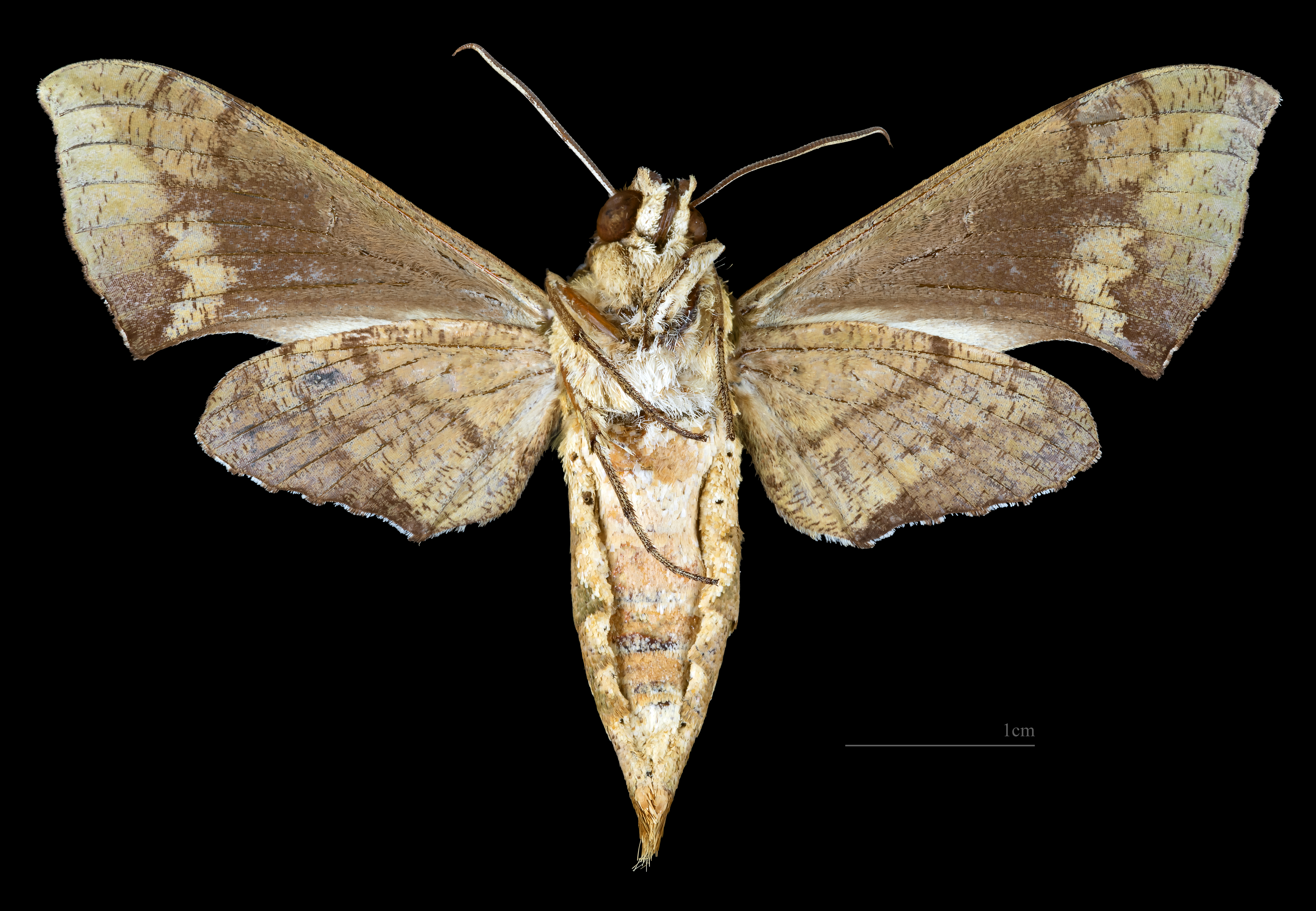
- Male ventral

Scientific classification
- Domain: Eukaryota
- Kingdom: Animalia
- Phylum: Arthropoda
- Class: Insecta
- Order: Lepidoptera
- Family: Sphingidae
- Genus: Xylophanes
- Species: X. depuiseti

Binomial name
- Xylophanes depuiseti (Boisduval, 1875)

Synonyms
- Eucheryx depuiseti Boisduval, 1875

= Xylophanes depuiseti =

Species of moth

Xylophanes depuiseti is a moth of the family Sphingidae. It is known from Brazil and is probably also present in Paraguay.

It is similar to Xylophanes adalia and Xylophanes ploetzi. The upperside is olive green. The abdomen has two rows of feeble brown dots dorsally. Each side has a row of pale, golden apical dots.

There are at least two to three generations per year.

The larvae probably feed on Rubiaceae and Malvaceae species.
