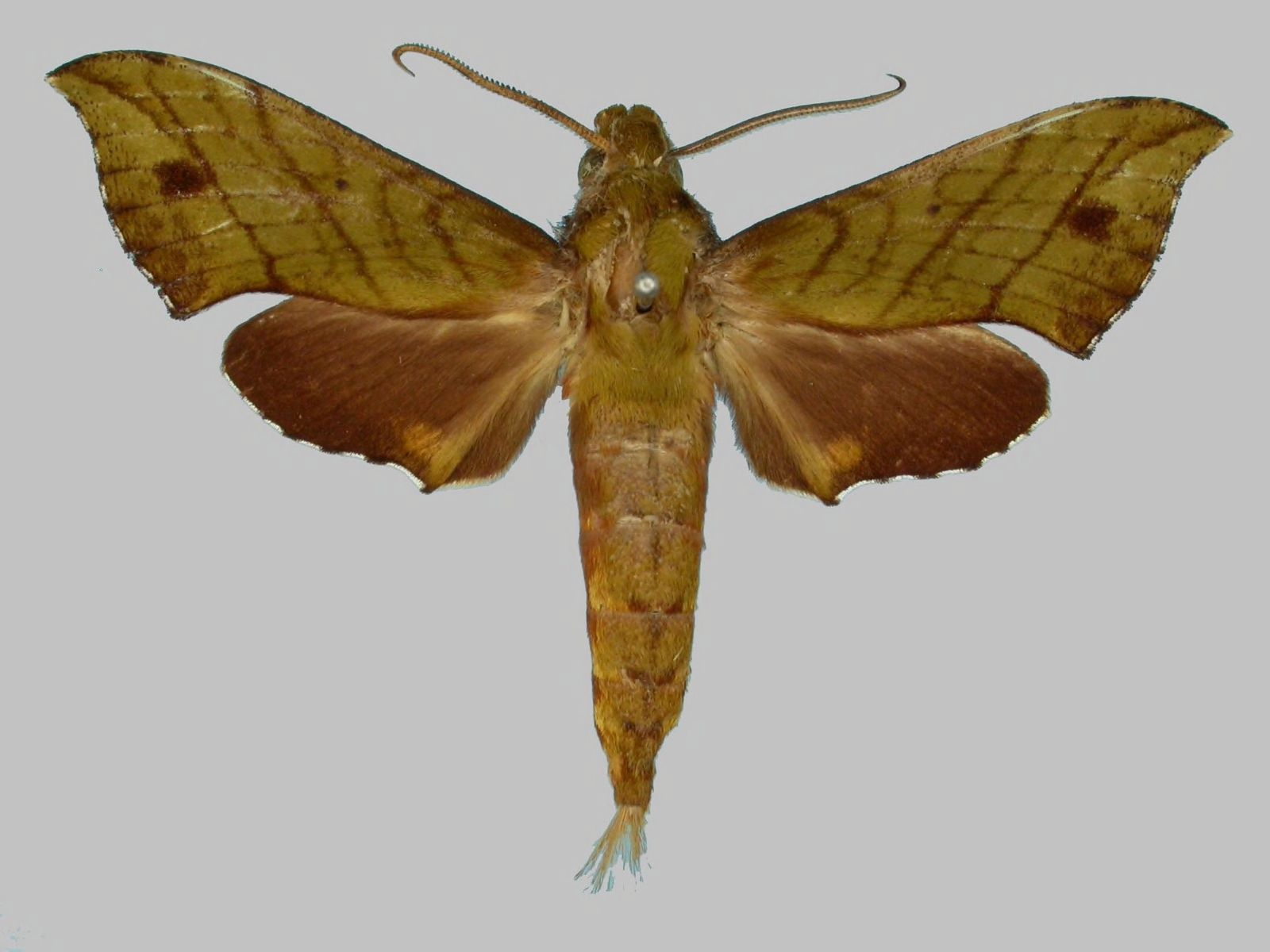

Scientific classification
- Domain: Eukaryota
- Kingdom: Animalia
- Phylum: Arthropoda
- Class: Insecta
- Order: Lepidoptera
- Family: Sphingidae
- Genus: Xylophanes
- Species: X. adalia

Binomial name
- Xylophanes adalia (H. Druce, 1881)

Synonyms
- Calliomma adalia H. Druce, 1881

= Xylophanes adalia =

Species of moth

Xylophanes adalia is a moth of the family Sphingidae first described by Herbert Druce in 1881. It is known from Panama, Costa Rica north to south-eastern Belize and Mexico. In the south, it ranges as far as Ecuador.

The wingspan is 55–56 mm. The females are larger than the males. It is similar to Xylophanes depuiseti and Xylophanes ploetzi, but the underside of the body and wings is more golden yellow and the lines on the forewing upperside are more distinct.

Adults are on wing in January in Ecuador and possibly longer elsewhere.

Larvae have been recorded feeding on Psychotria panamensis, Psychotria nervosa and Pavonia guanacastensis.
