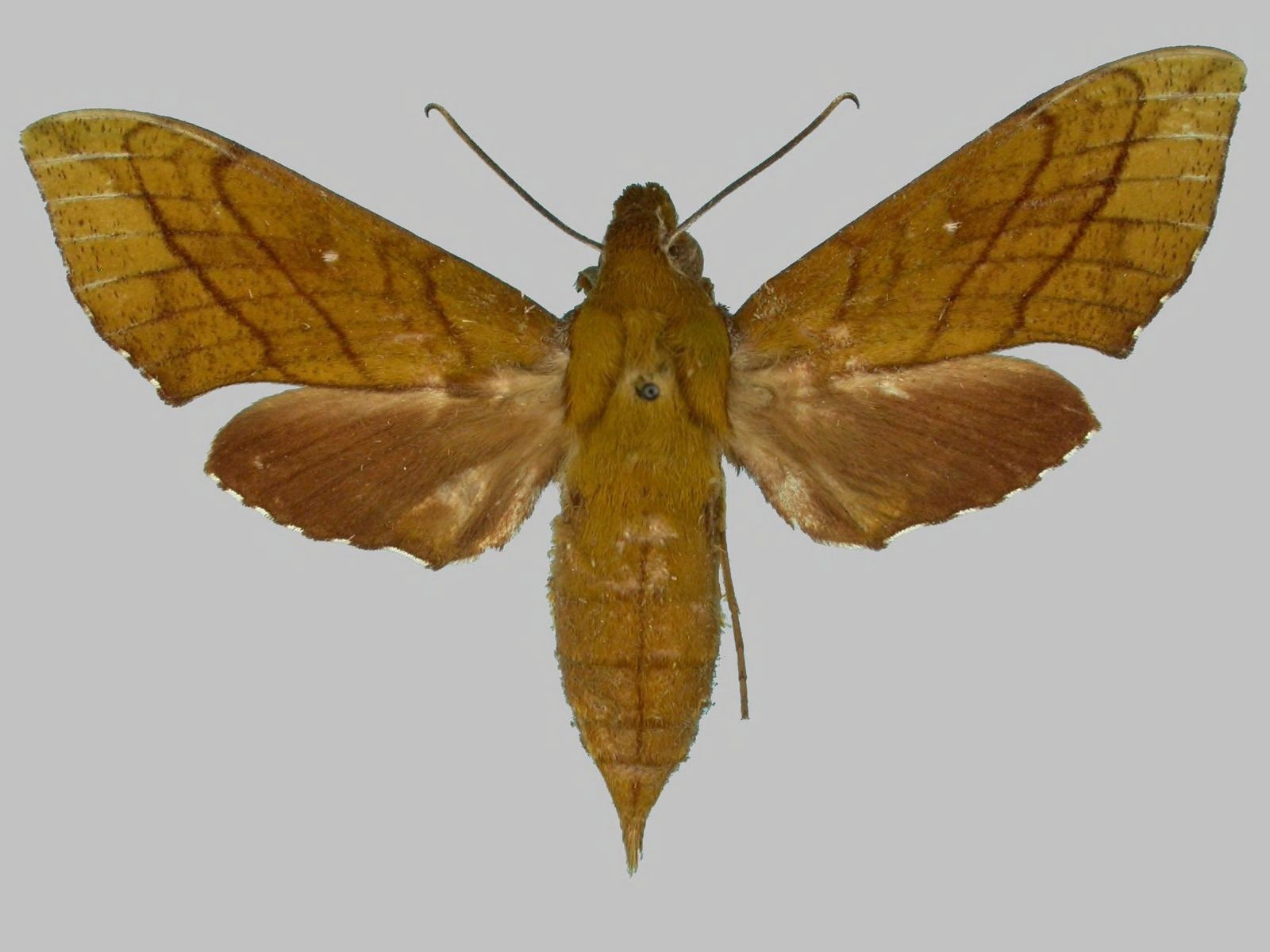

Scientific classification
- Domain: Eukaryota
- Kingdom: Animalia
- Phylum: Arthropoda
- Class: Insecta
- Order: Lepidoptera
- Family: Sphingidae
- Genus: Xylophanes
- Species: X. ploetzi

Binomial name
- Xylophanes ploetzi (Möschler, 1876)

Synonyms
- Chaerocampa ploetzi Möschler, 1876; Calliomma drucei Rothschild, 1894

= Xylophanes ploetzi =

Species of moth

Xylophanes ploetzi is a moth of the family Sphingidae. It is known from Suriname, French Guiana and Venezuela.

It is similar to Xylophanes depuiseti and Xylophanes adalia. The abdomen has a thin median dorsal line. The underside of the body and wings is yellowish green. The lines of the forewing are distinct, apart from the oblique apical line. The stigma is white and the fringe has white dots which are restricted to the posterior part of the wing. The marginal areas of the underside of both wings is a little more greenish than the disc. On the hindwing shaded with olive.

There are probably multiple generations per year.

The larvae probably feed on Rubiaceae and Malvaceae species.
