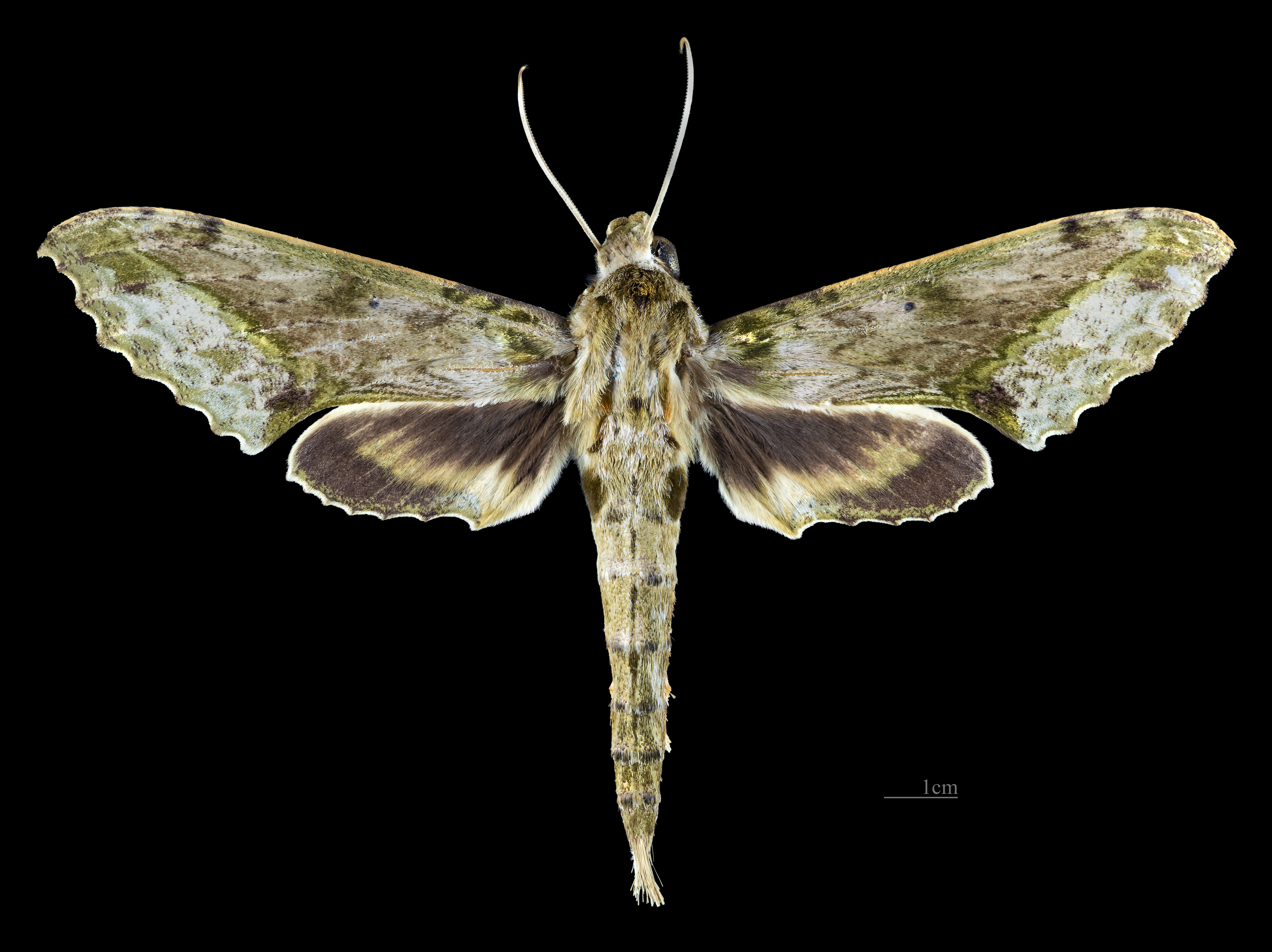
- Male dorsal
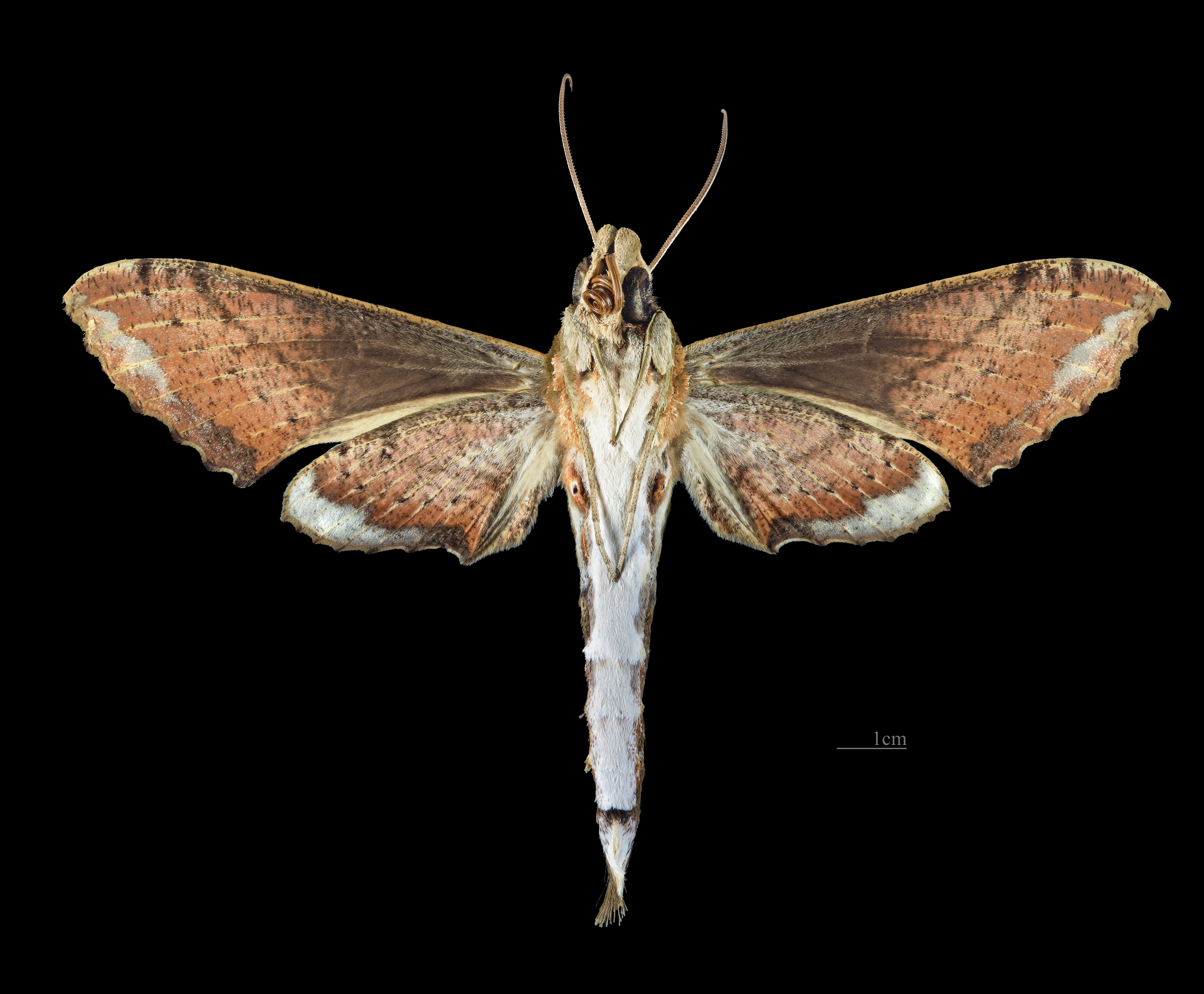
- Male ventral

Scientific classification
- Domain: Eukaryota
- Kingdom: Animalia
- Phylum: Arthropoda
- Class: Insecta
- Order: Lepidoptera
- Family: Sphingidae
- Genus: Xylophanes
- Species: X. undata

Binomial name
- Xylophanes undata Rothschild & Jordan, 1903

Synonyms
- Gonenyo irrorata Rothschild, 1895

= Xylophanes undata =

Species of moth

Xylophanes undata is a moth of the family Sphingidae.

== Distribution ==
It is found from Central America to Peru and further south into Bolivia.

== Description ==
The wingspan is 72–83 mm. It is similar in colour and pattern to Xylophanes zurcheri, but the forewing outer margin is more strongly crenulated, the crenulations are all of similar size except for one which is slightly longer. Furthermore, the most distal postmedian line on the forewing upperside is more conspicuous and straight and delineating a narrow, rectangular, pale purple-grey patch.

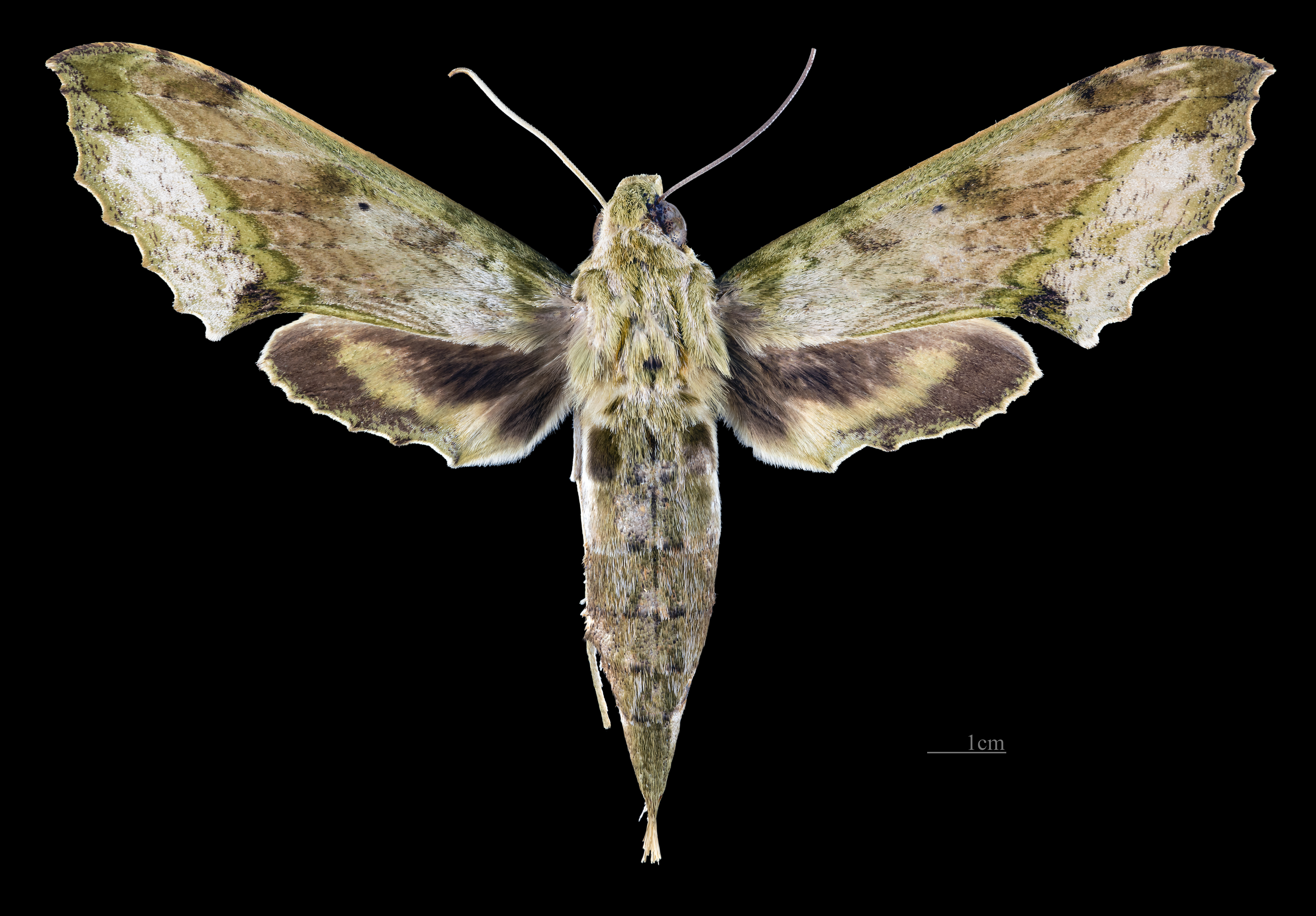
Female dorsal

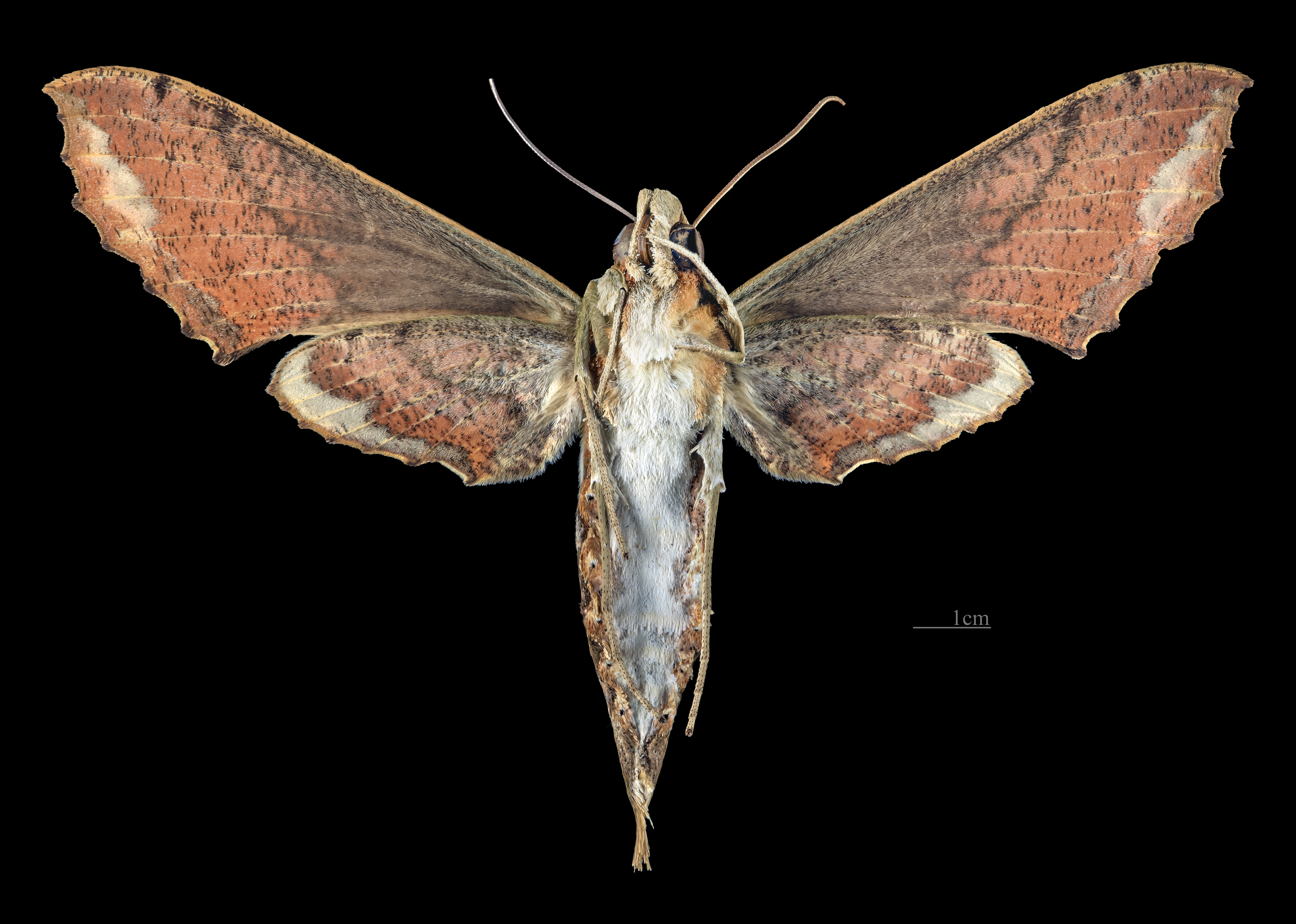
Female ventral

== Biology ==
Adults have been recorded year round (except March) in Costa Rica. In Peru, there are three generations per year with adults on wing from January to February, in June and in October.

The larvae probably feed on Rubiaceae species.
