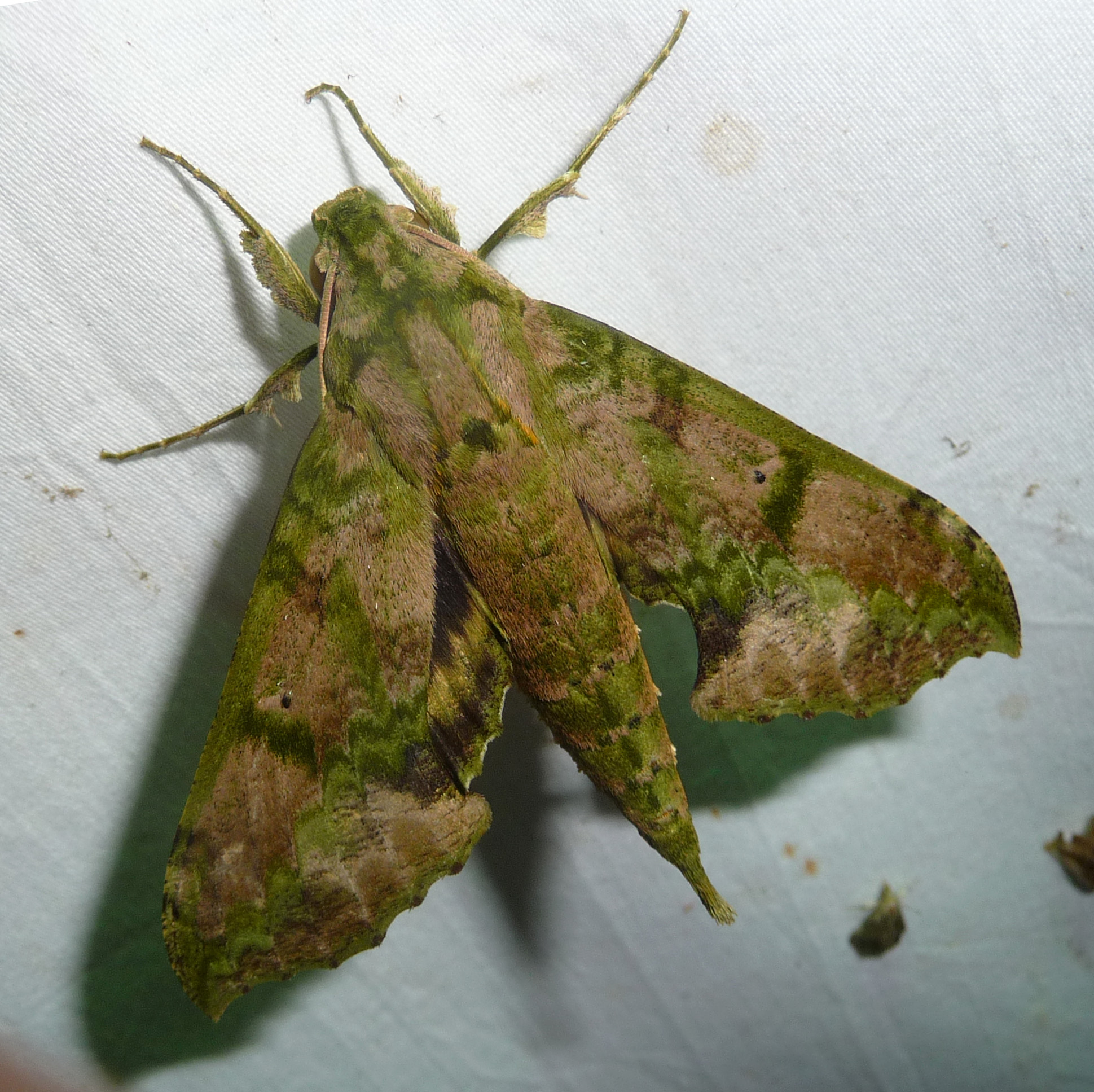

Scientific classification
- Domain: Eukaryota
- Kingdom: Animalia
- Phylum: Arthropoda
- Class: Insecta
- Order: Lepidoptera
- Family: Sphingidae
- Genus: Xylophanes
- Species: X. zurcheri

Binomial name
- Xylophanes zurcheri (H. Druce, 1894)

Synonyms
- Calliomma zurcheri H. Druce, 1894

= Xylophanes zurcheri =

Species of moth

Xylophanes zurcheri is a moth of the family Sphingidae first described by Herbert Druce in 1894.

== Distribution ==
It is known from Mexico, Costa Rica, Guatemala and Belize.

== Description ==
It is similar to Xylophanes undata.

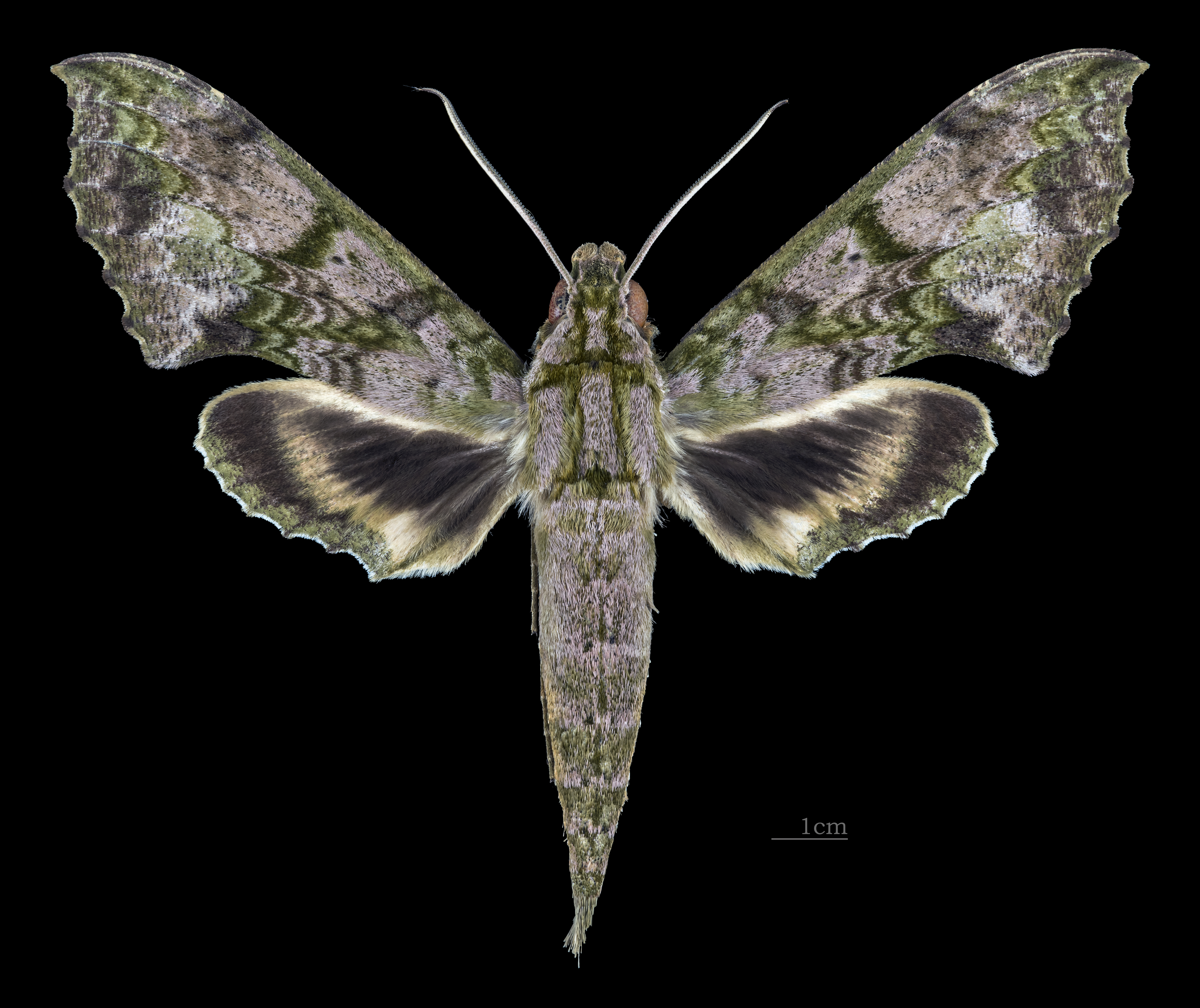
Male dorsal

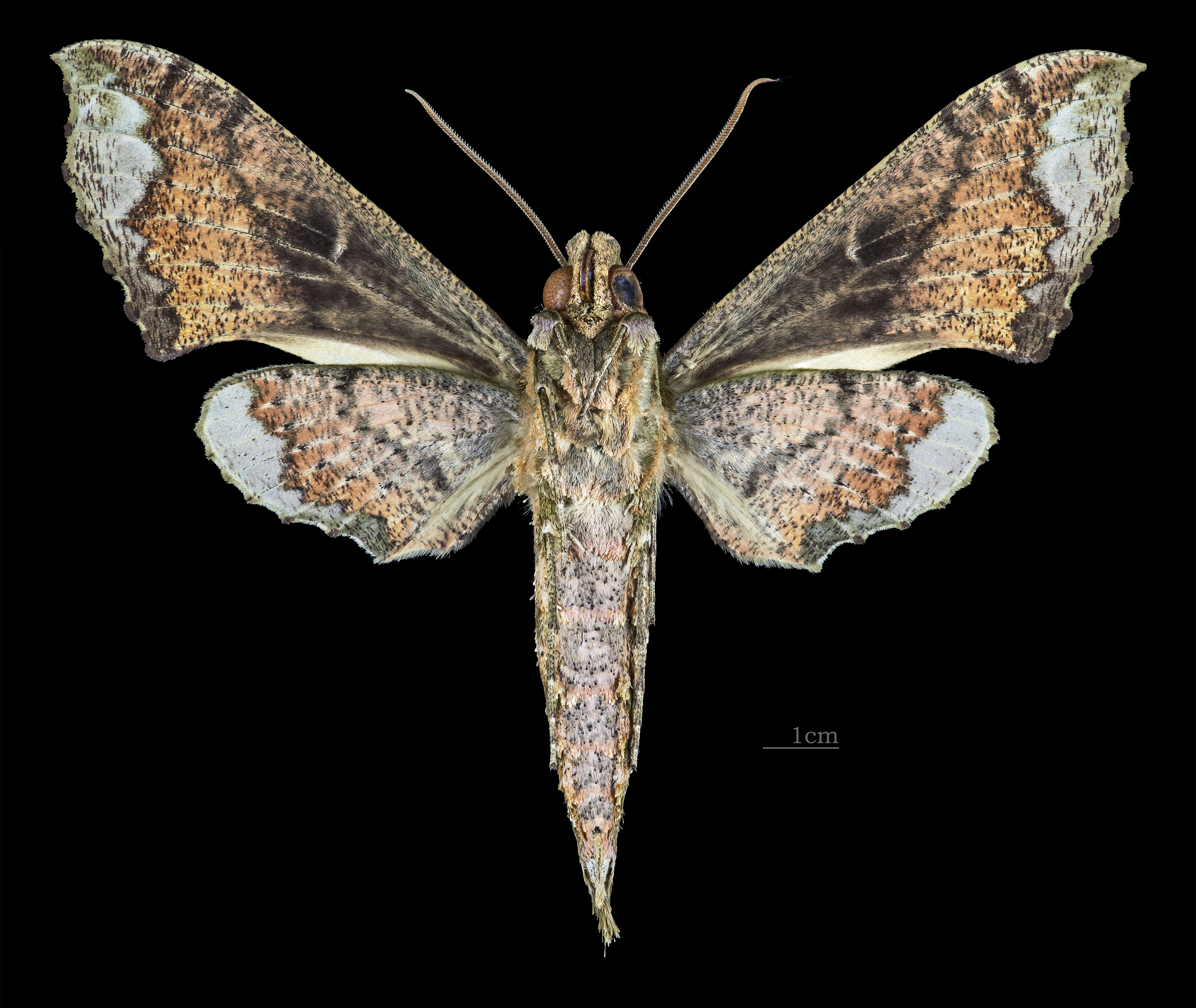
Male ventral

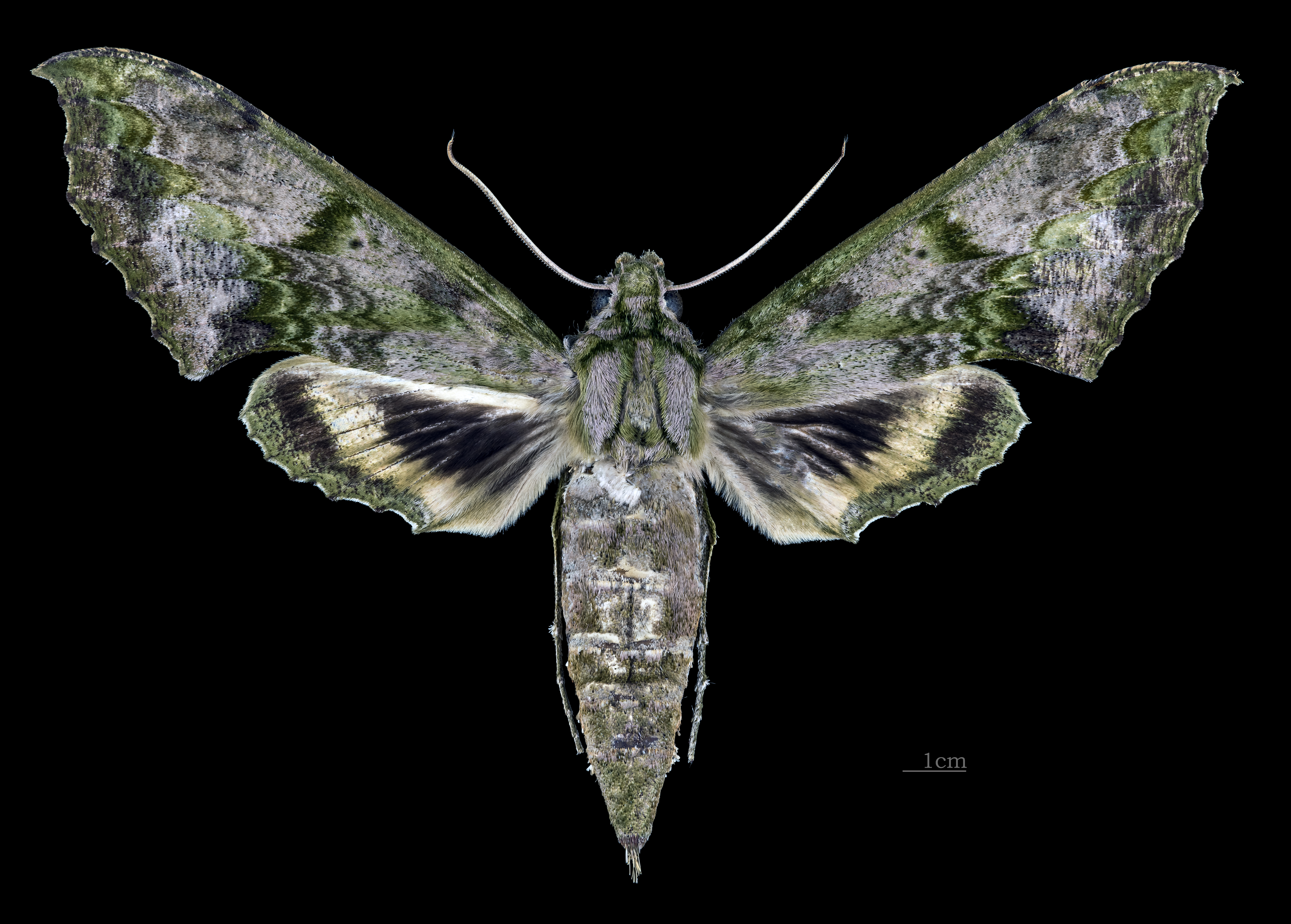
Female dorsal

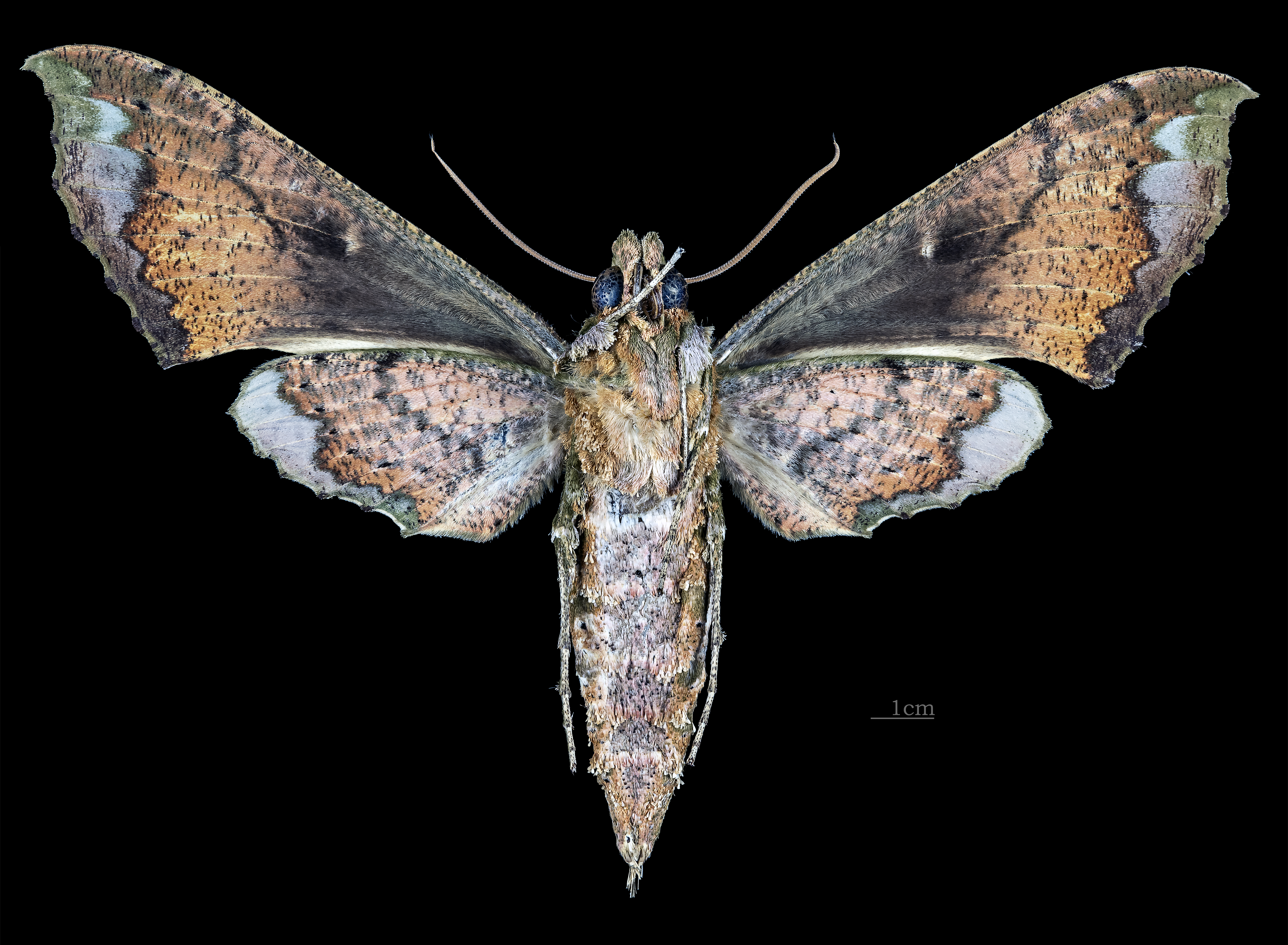
Female ventral

== Biology ==
Adults are on wing in April, May and June in Costa Rica.

The larvae feed on Psychotria eurycarpa, Psychotria panamensis, Psychotria berteriana, Psychotria correae, Psychotria pittieri and Palicourea salicifolia. There are green and brown forms.
