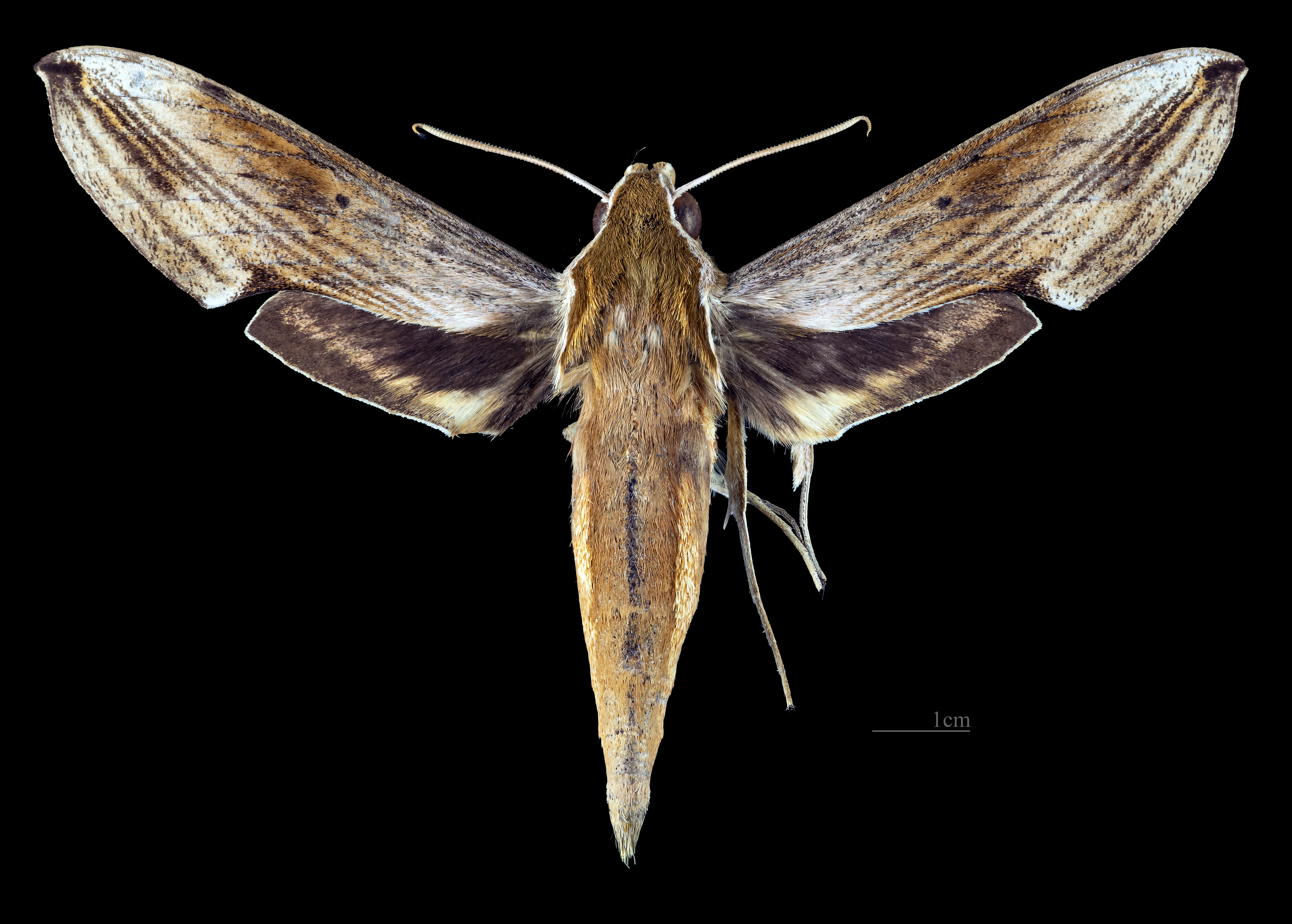
- Male dorsal
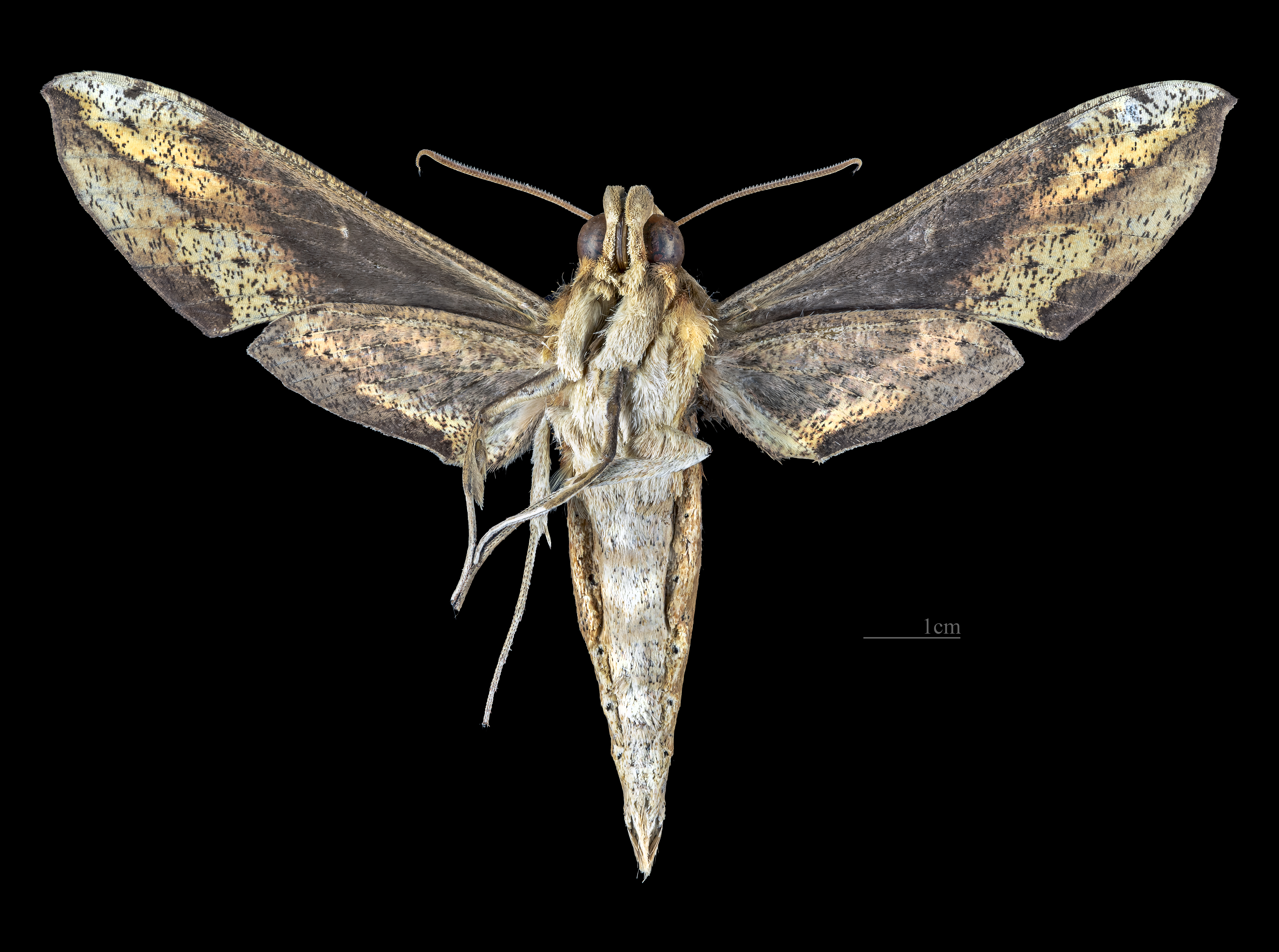
- Male ventral

Scientific classification
- Domain: Eukaryota
- Kingdom: Animalia
- Phylum: Arthropoda
- Class: Insecta
- Order: Lepidoptera
- Family: Sphingidae
- Genus: Xylophanes
- Species: X. dolius

Binomial name
- Xylophanes dolius Rothschild & Jordan, 1906

= Xylophanes dolius =

Species of moth

Xylophanes dolius is a moth of the family Sphingidae. It is known from Ecuador and Bolivia.

== Description ==
The wingspan is about 70 mm for males. Females are larger. It is similar to Xylophanes hydrata in forewing shape but the ground colour is brown and there are differences in pattern. The abdomen is without basal lateral patches. The lateral stripes are pale golden yellow and the dorsal median line is narrow and flanked by two diffuse lines weakly emphasized by spots on the posterior margins of the tergites. The base of the forewing upperside is pale grey, although the middle third is brown, with a conspicuous small discal spot, immediately beyond which are two or three short, darker brown longitudinal dashes. The distal third is yellowish grey. The basal half of the forewing underside is brown and the distal part is yellow, irrorated with brown. The apex has a conspicuous brown patch. There is also a brown patch on the tornus. The marginal area between these two patches is paler and yellow suffused with orange. The hindwing upperside is dark brown. The pale median band is poorly developed and often suffused with black over the distal half.

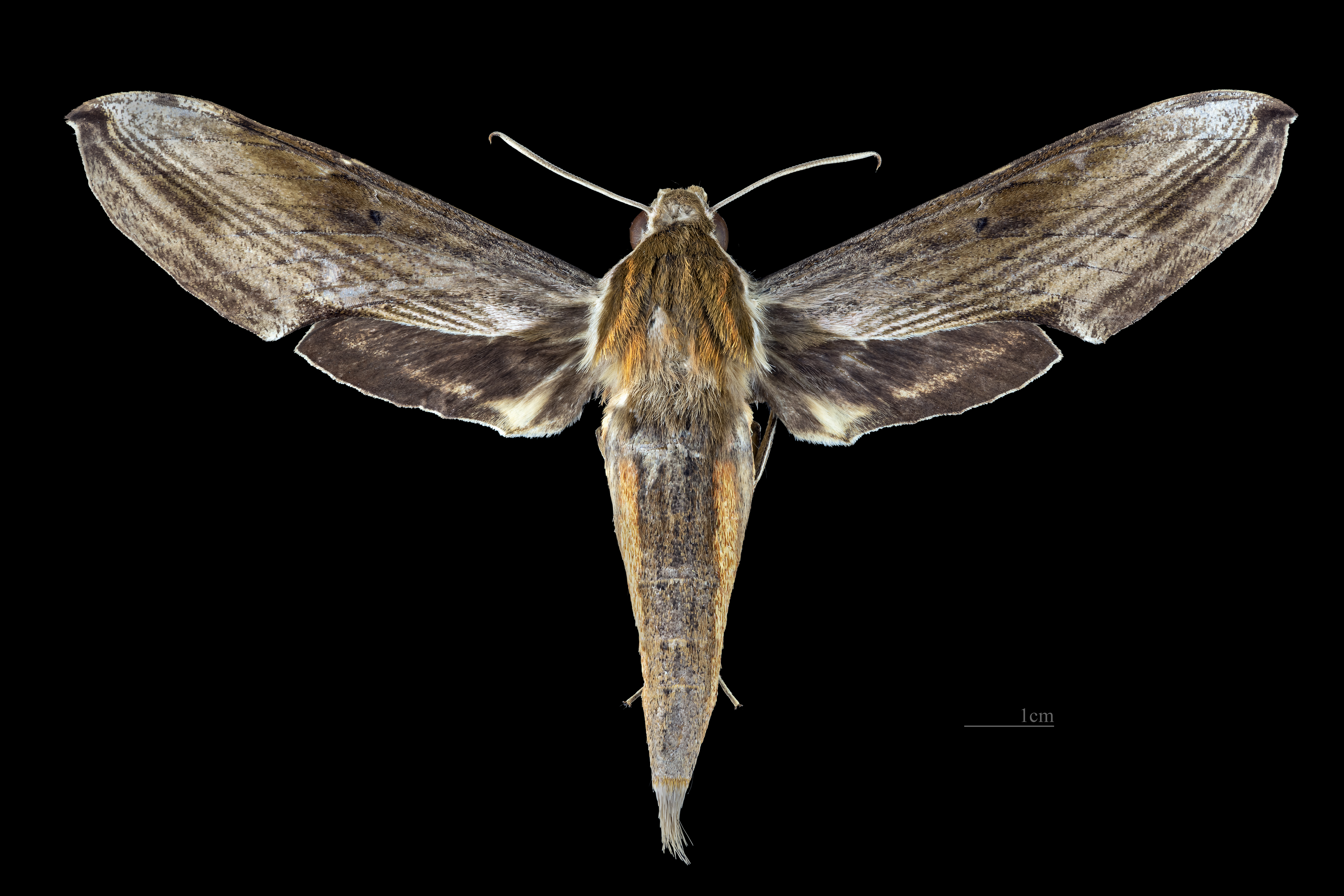
Female dorsal

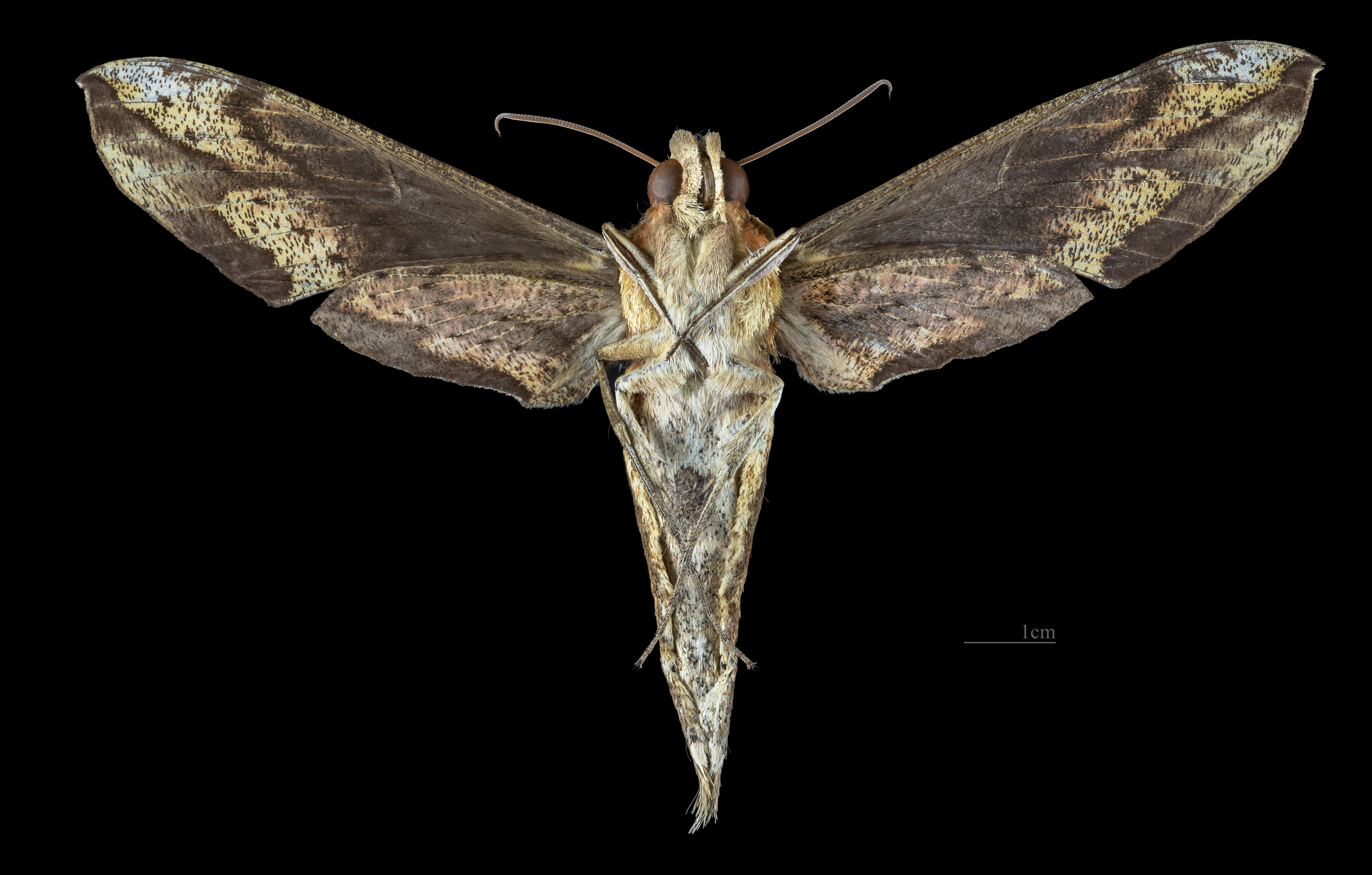
Female ventral

== Biology ==
The larvae probably feed on Rubiaceae and Malvaceae species.
