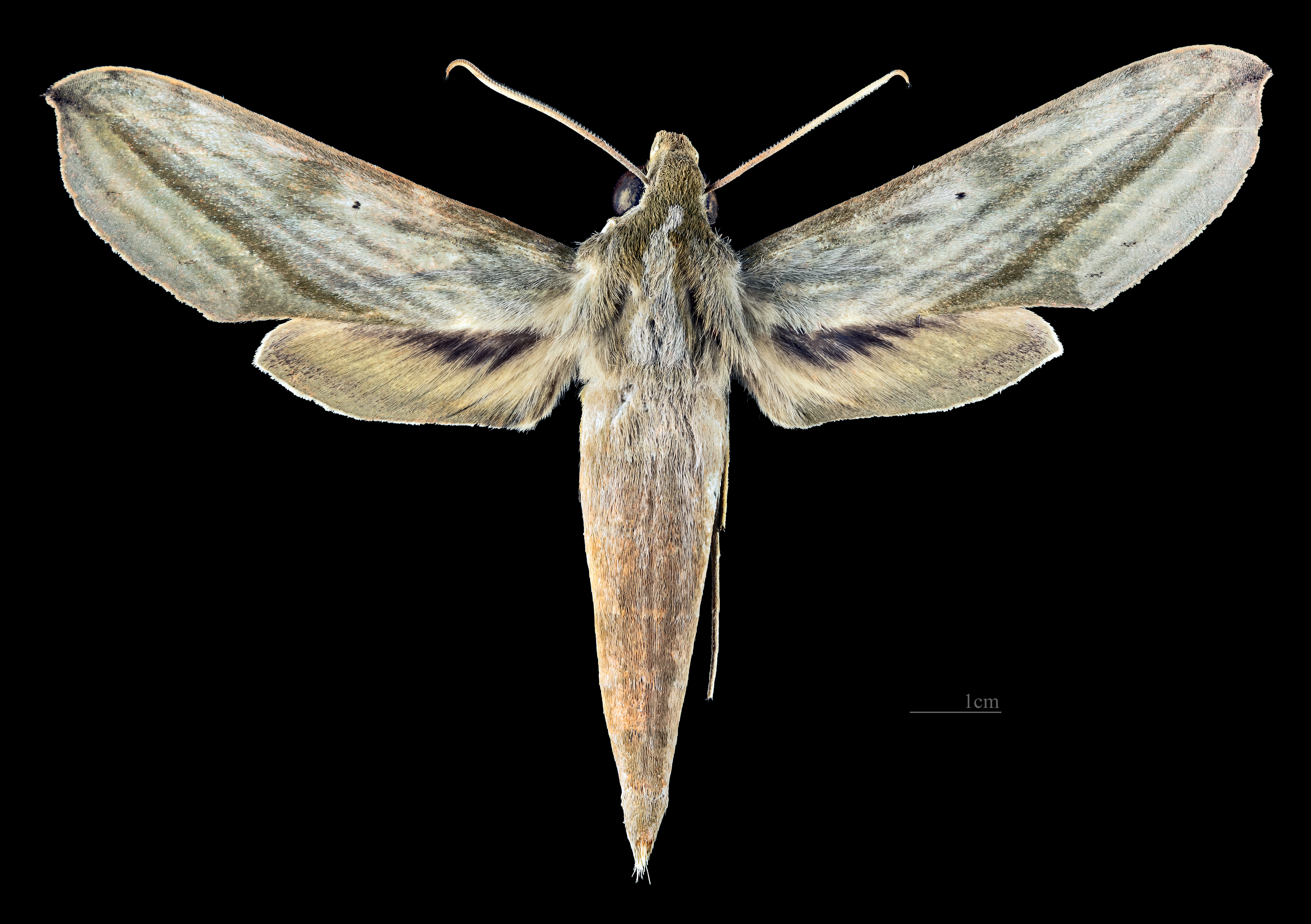
- Male dorsal
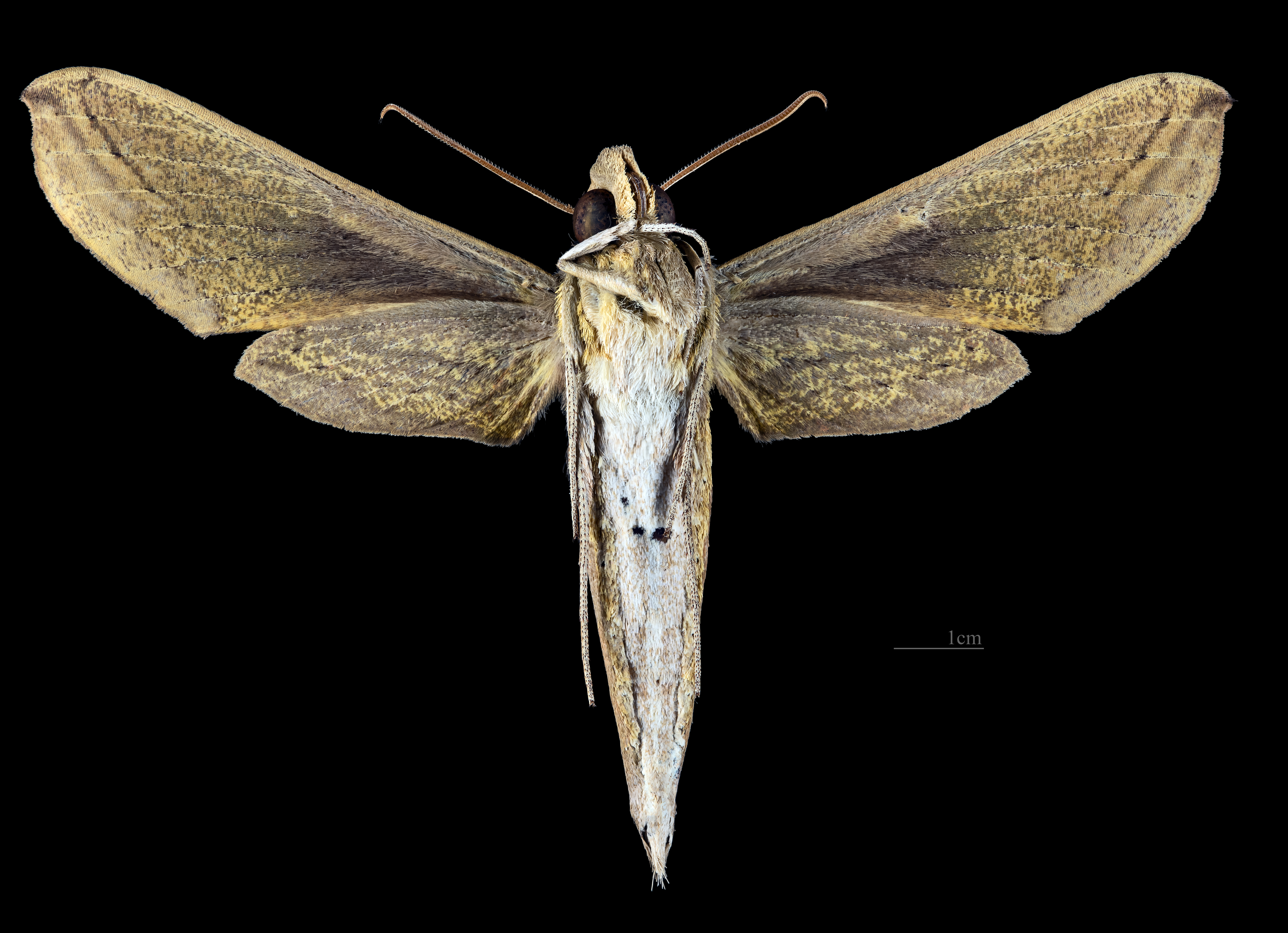
- Male ventral

Scientific classification
- Domain: Eukaryota
- Kingdom: Animalia
- Phylum: Arthropoda
- Class: Insecta
- Order: Lepidoptera
- Family: Sphingidae
- Genus: Xylophanes
- Species: X. hydrata

Binomial name
- Xylophanes hydrata Rothschild & Jordan, 1903

= Xylophanes hydrata =

Species of moth

Xylophanes hydrata is a moth of the family Sphingidae. It is found from Brazil west to Bolivia and Peru.

It is similar to Xylophanes elara but slightly larger and the postmedian lines and vein spots on the submarginal line on the forewing upperside are stronger. The postmedian line on the base of the forewing underside starts as a line but later becomes a row of vein dots. Often, the line is formed solely from vein spots or can even be entirely absent.

Adults are on wing in November and January in Peru.

The larvae probably feed on Rubiaceae and Malvaceae species.
