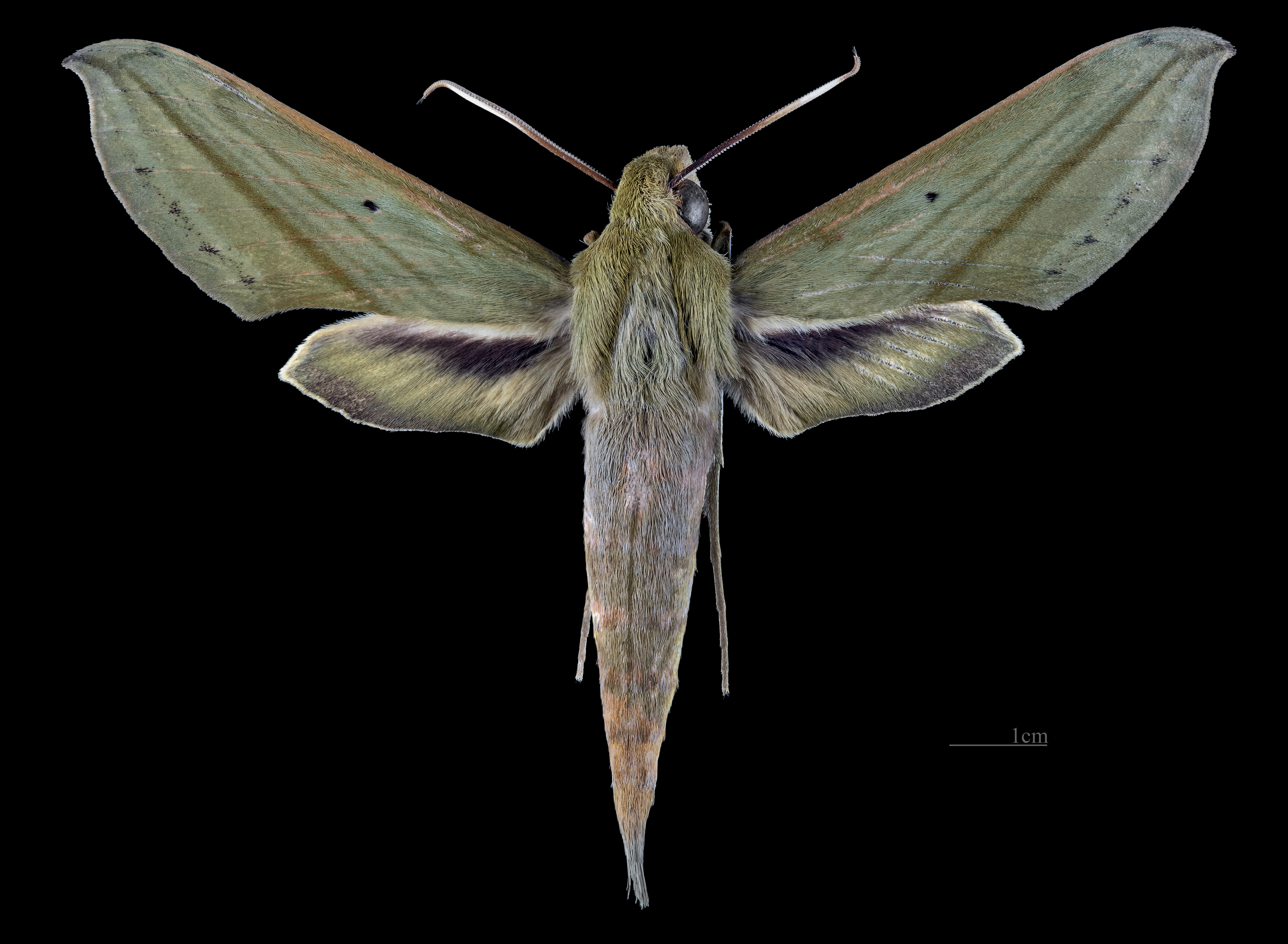
- Upperside
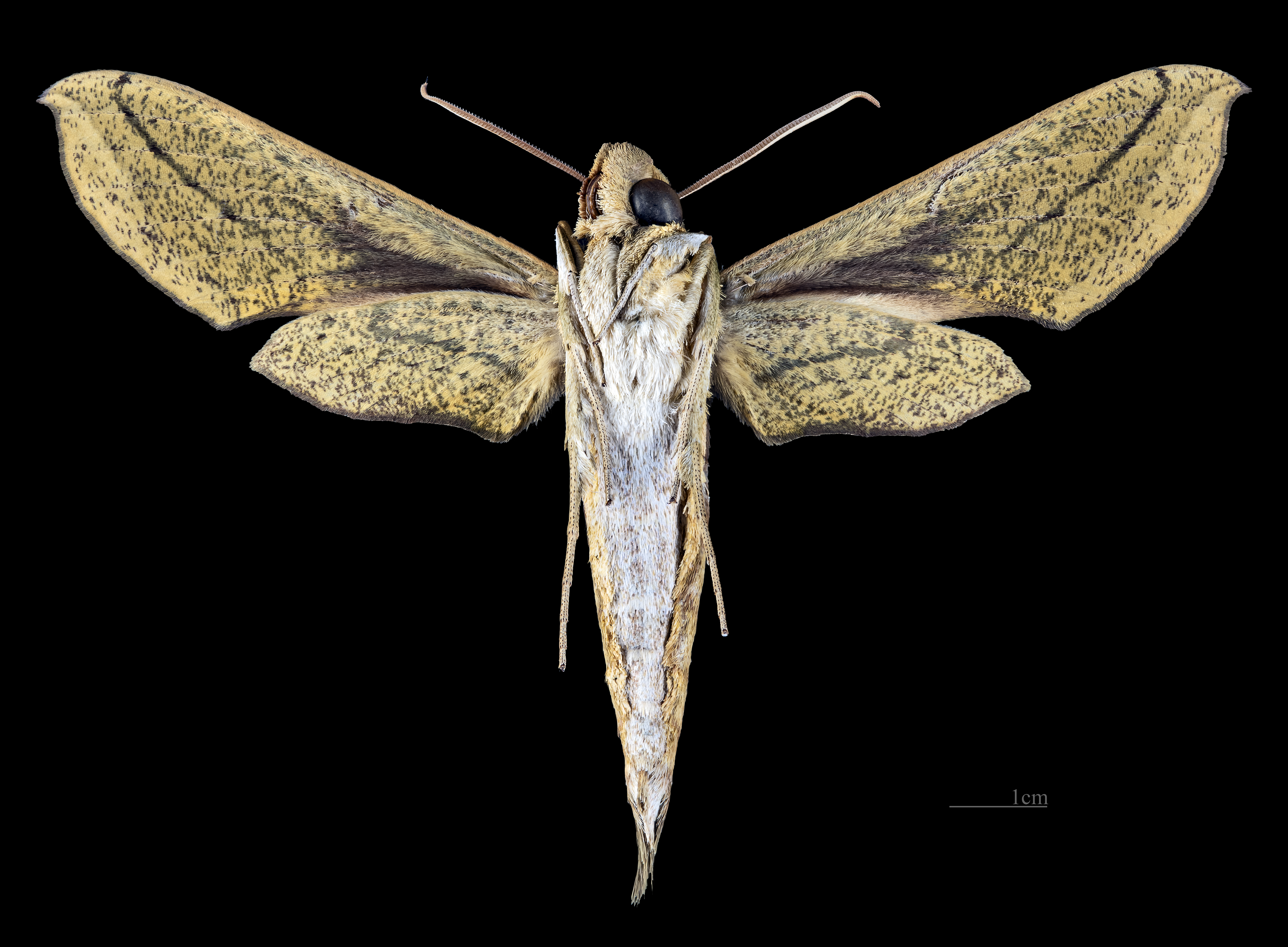
- Underside

Scientific classification
- Domain: Eukaryota
- Kingdom: Animalia
- Phylum: Arthropoda
- Class: Insecta
- Order: Lepidoptera
- Family: Sphingidae
- Genus: Xylophanes
- Species: X. elara

Binomial name
- Xylophanes elara (H. Druce, 1878)

Synonyms
- Darapsa elara H. Druce, 1878; Chaerocampa elicius Möschler, 1882; Theretra perviridis Rothschild, 1894; Xelophanes elara simulans (Raymundo da Silva, 1934)

= Xylophanes elara =

Species of moth

Xylophanes elara is a moth of the family Sphingidae first described by Herbert Druce in 1878. It is known from Paraguay, Suriname, Venezuela, Bolivia and Brazil.

The upperside of the wings and body are olive green and the distal margin of the forewing is strongly excavate below the falcate apex, then convex. The dorsal scales of the antennae are basally brown, distally cream before the apex. The thorax is unicolorous. The abdomen has a thin darker olive-greenish olive medial line dorsally. The underside of the abdomen is whitish grey. The forewing upperside has a small, conspicuous, black discal spot. The postmedian lines are straight and oblique. The first to third lines are faint, the fourth is much stronger and the fifth is not distinct except apically. The submarginal line is faint and highlighted by a row of faint vein spots. The base of the forewing underside has a greyish-black triangular patch that just enters the discal cell. The postmedian line that corresponds to the fourth line of the upperside is conspicuous and accentuated by a dot at the costa. The apical line is indistinct. The basal half of the hindwing upperside is black and the median band is buff suffused with olive green. The hindwing underside has a weak, pale grey median line. The postmedian line is represented by a row of elongate vein spots.

Adults are on wing from March to April and again in August in Bolivia.

The larvae probably feed on Rubiaceae and Malvaceae species.
