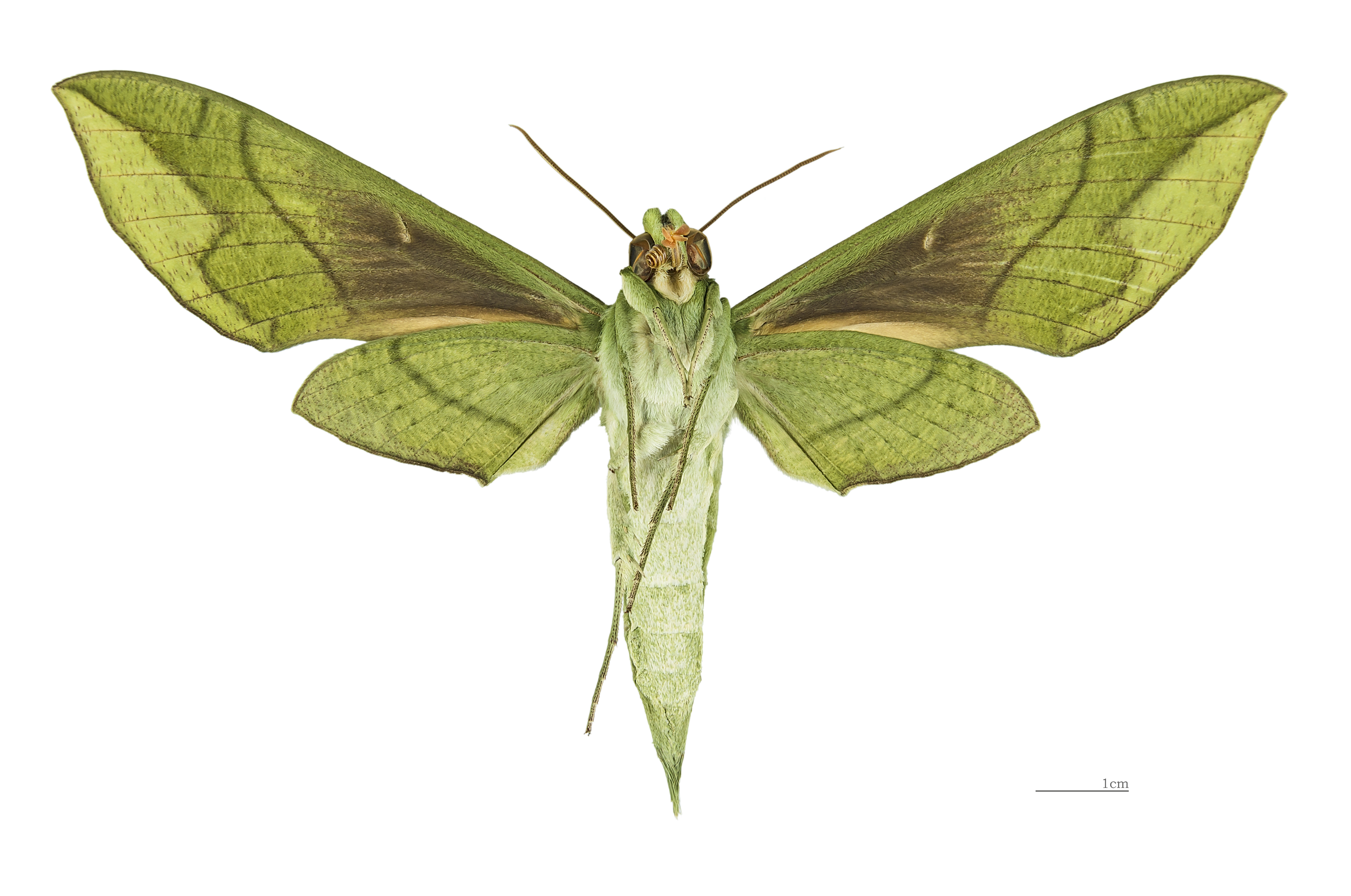
- Underside

Scientific classification
- Domain: Eukaryota
- Kingdom: Animalia
- Phylum: Arthropoda
- Class: Insecta
- Order: Lepidoptera
- Family: Sphingidae
- Genus: Xylophanes
- Species: X. tyndarus

Binomial name
- Xylophanes tyndarus (Boisduval, 1875)

Synonyms
- Choerocampa tyndarus Boisduval, 1875

= Xylophanes tyndarus =

- Upperside

Species of moth

Xylophanes tyndarus is a moth of the family Sphingidae first described by Jean Baptiste Boisduval in 1875. It is distributed from Mexico and Belize to Brazil and westward into Bolivia.

The wingspan is 75 to 86 mm (3.0 to 3.4 in). The upperside of the body and wings is green, often very bright. The underside of the body is whitish green. The forewing has three narrow antemedian lines. The postmedian line is well marked, straight, the basal edge is sharply delineated, the distal edge is diffuse and it is gradually lightening toward the outer margin. The remaining postmedian lines are poorly defined or absent. The oblique apical line is short. The oblique apical line on the forewing underside forms an angle with the irregularly undulate postmedian line, the marginal area bordered by these lines is as broad as in Xylophanes schausi. The green median band on the hindwing does not reach the costa. The distal margin is often green.

There are probably at least two generations per year. In Costa Rica, adults have been recorded from November to February and again from April to July. In Brazil, adults have been recorded in September and December.

The larvae feed on Faramea occidentalis and probably other Rubiaceae species. Early instars are green with yellow eyes, and feed solely on new leaves. They turn brown in the last instar and have a yellow eyespot.
