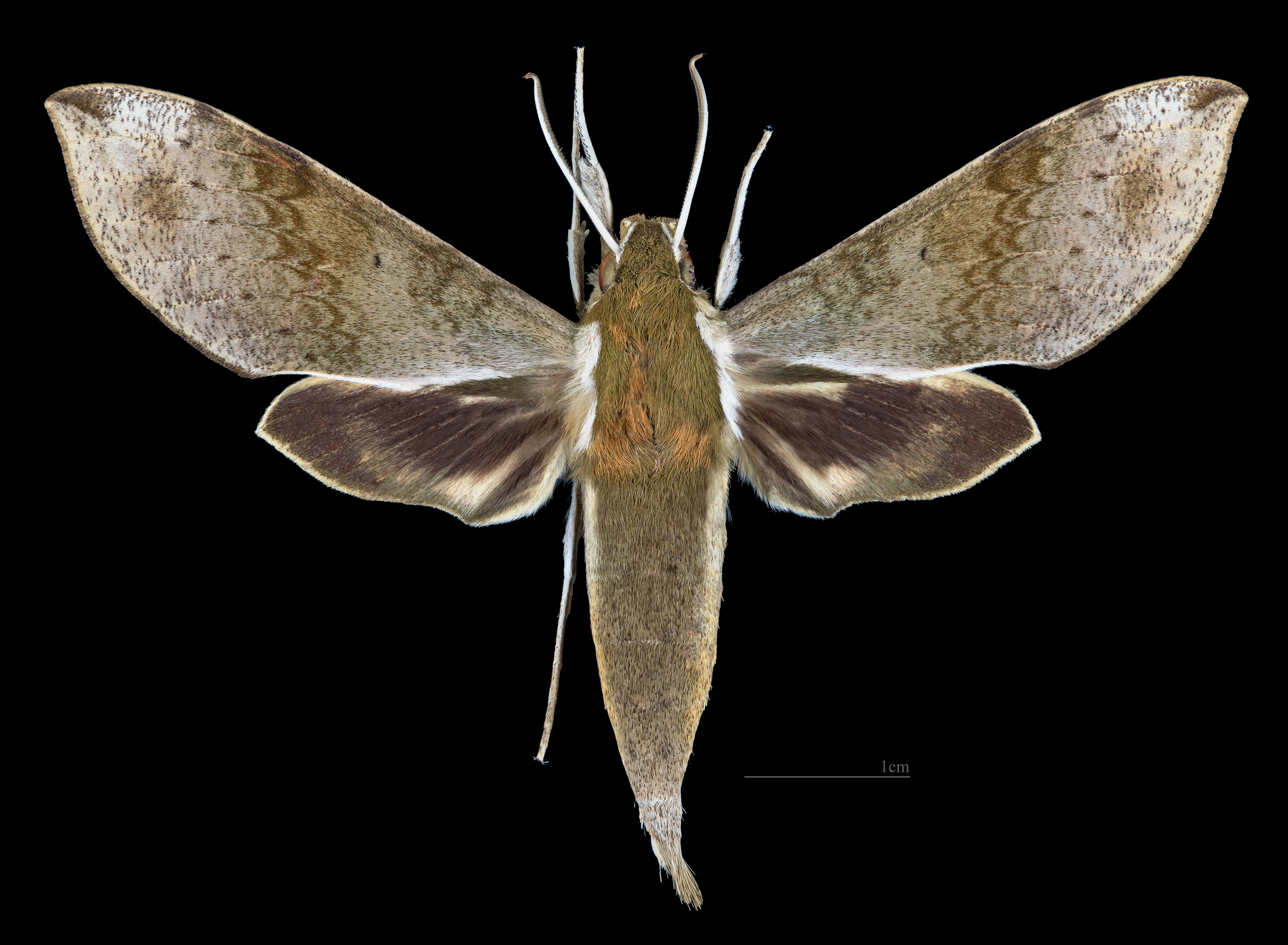
- Male dorsal
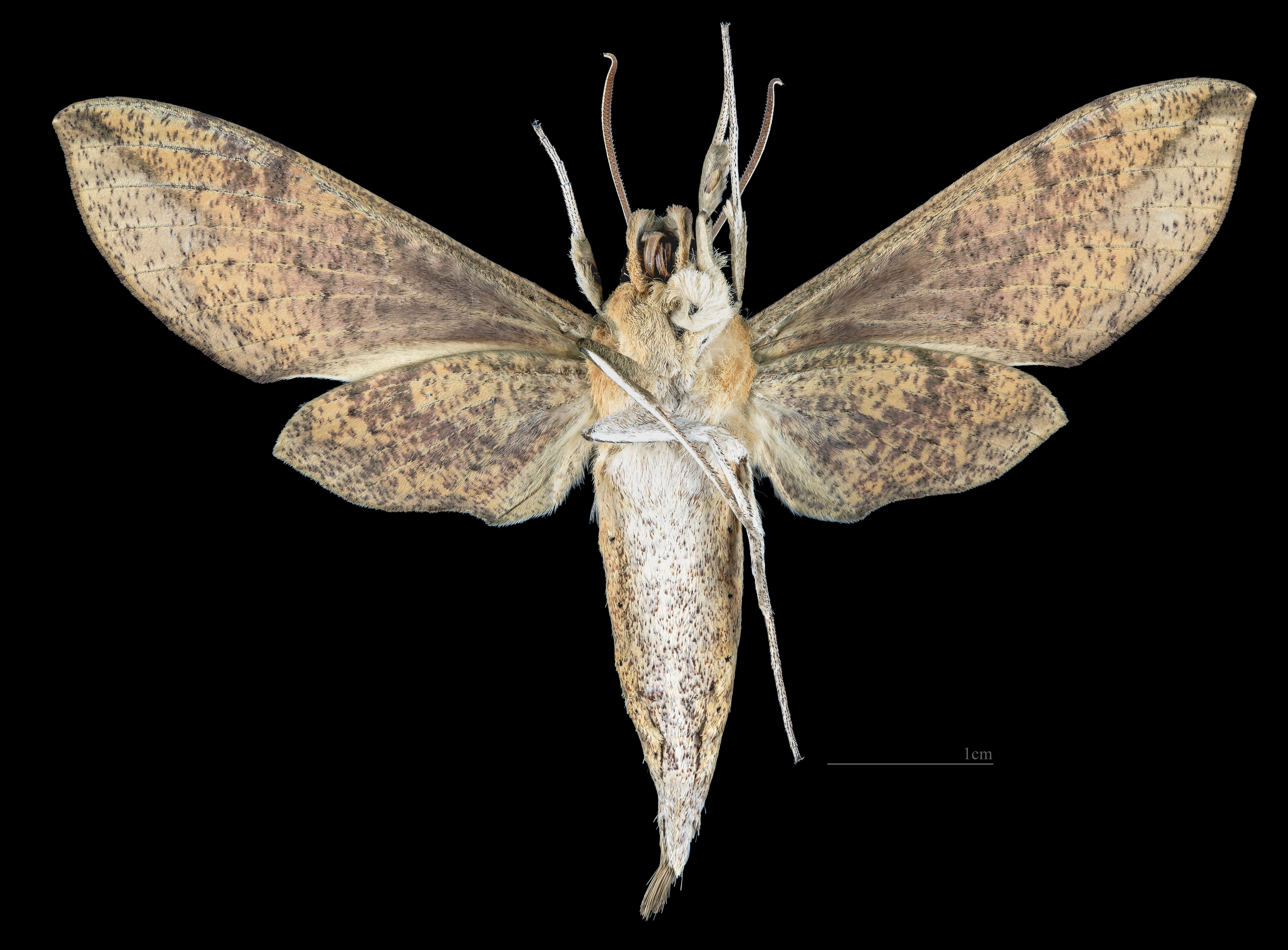
- Male ventral

Scientific classification
- Domain: Eukaryota
- Kingdom: Animalia
- Phylum: Arthropoda
- Class: Insecta
- Order: Lepidoptera
- Family: Sphingidae
- Genus: Xylophanes
- Species: X. schausi

Binomial name
- Xylophanes schausi (Rothschild, 1894)

Synonyms
- Darapsa schausi Rothschild, 1894; Theretra arpi Schaus, 1898

= Xylophanes schausi =

Species of moth

Xylophanes schausi is a moth of the family Sphingidae first described by Walter Rothschild in 1894.

== Distribution ==
It is known from Venezuela, Brazil and Bolivia.

== Description ==
The distal margin of the forewing is strongly convex. The abdomen has no dorsal lines. The postmedian lines are dentate and the two proximal lines are faint, but traceable from the costal to the inner margin. The third is barely indicated and the fourth is marked only by dots on the veins. The pale median band is pale olive brown.

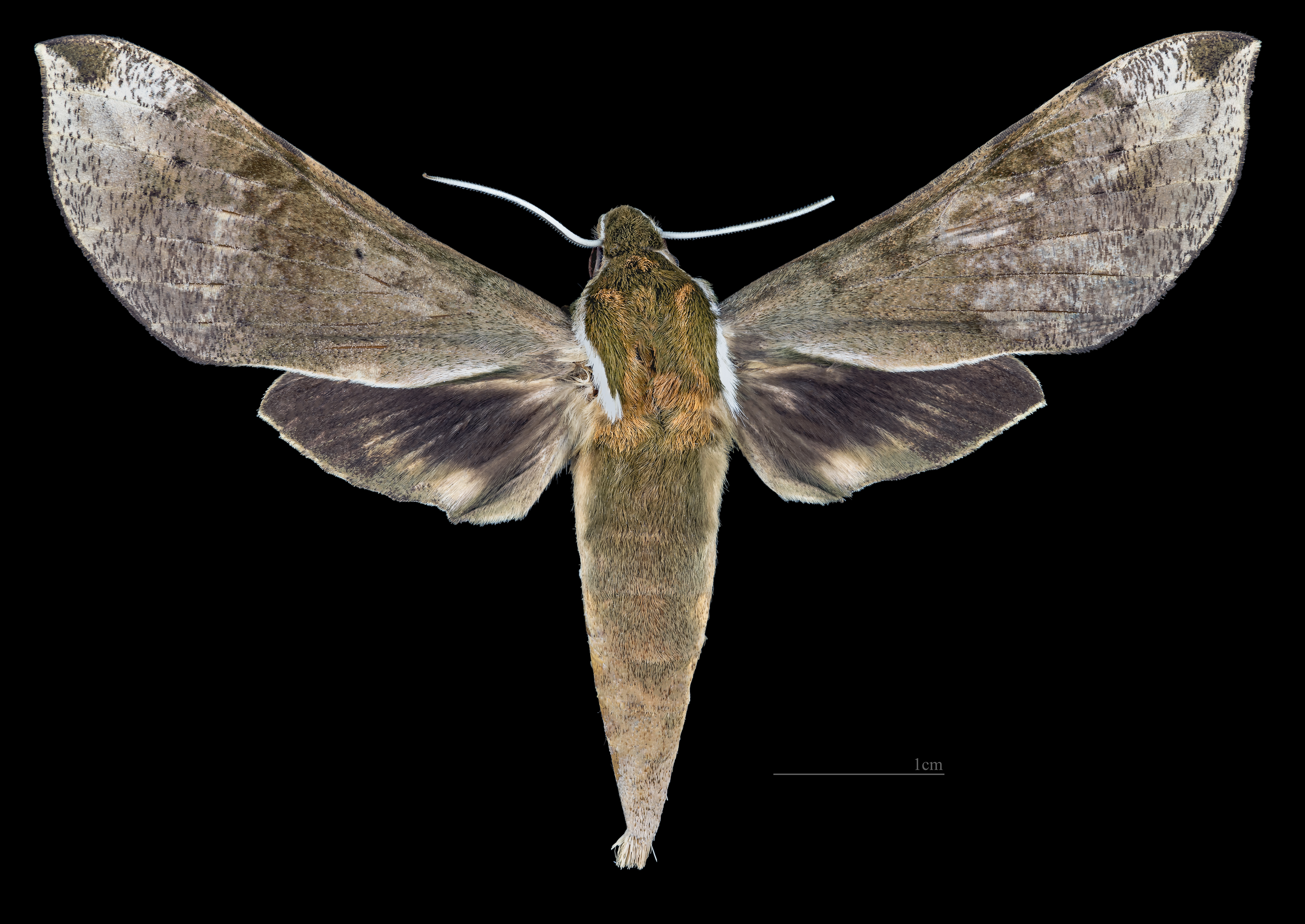
Female dorsal

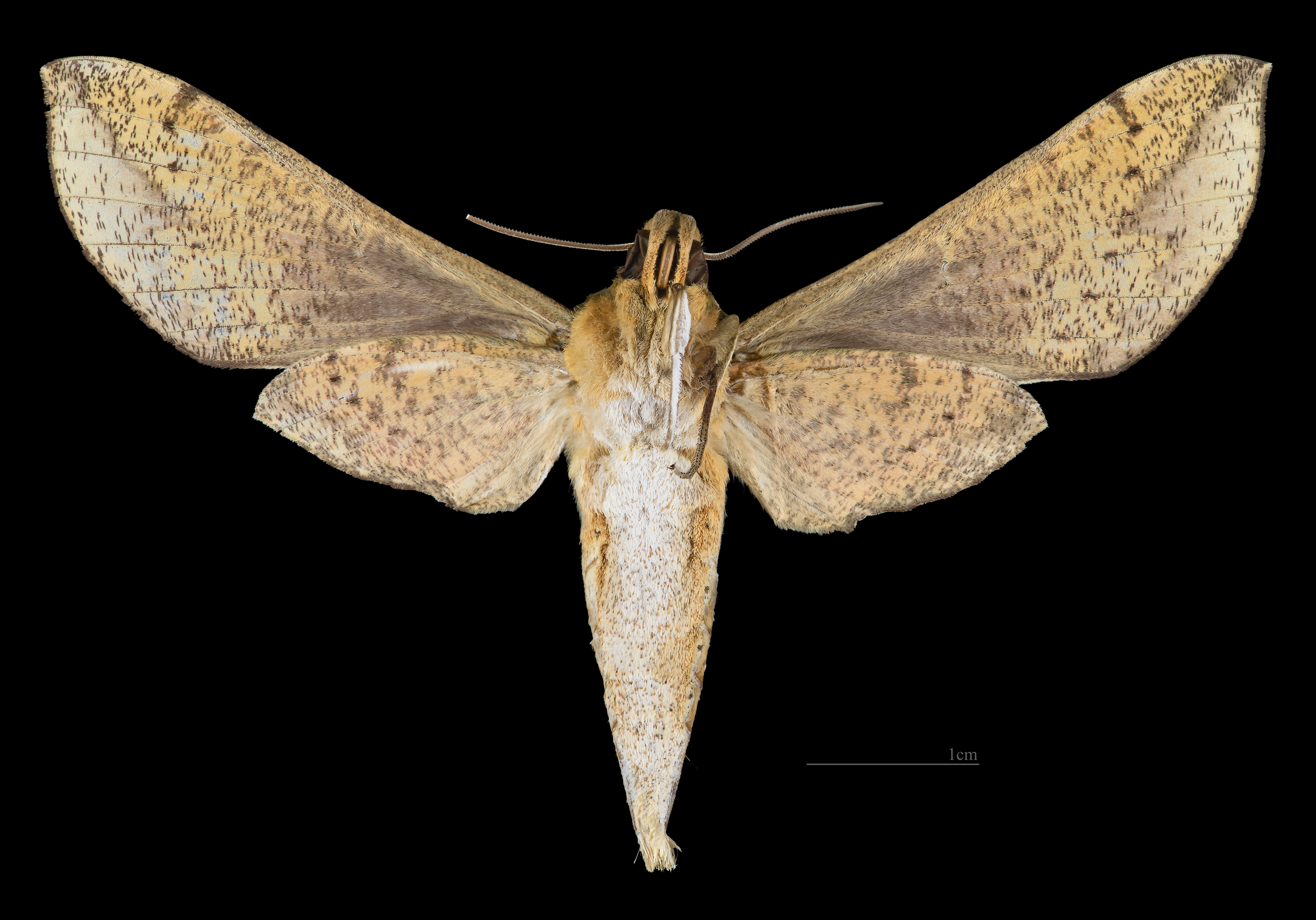
Female ventral

== Biology ==
Adults are probably on wing year round.

The larvae probably feed on Rubiaceae and Malvaceae species.

== Subspecies ==
- Xylophanes schausi schausi (Brazil and Bolivia)
- Xylophanes schausi serenus Rothschild & Jordan, 1910 (Venezuela)
