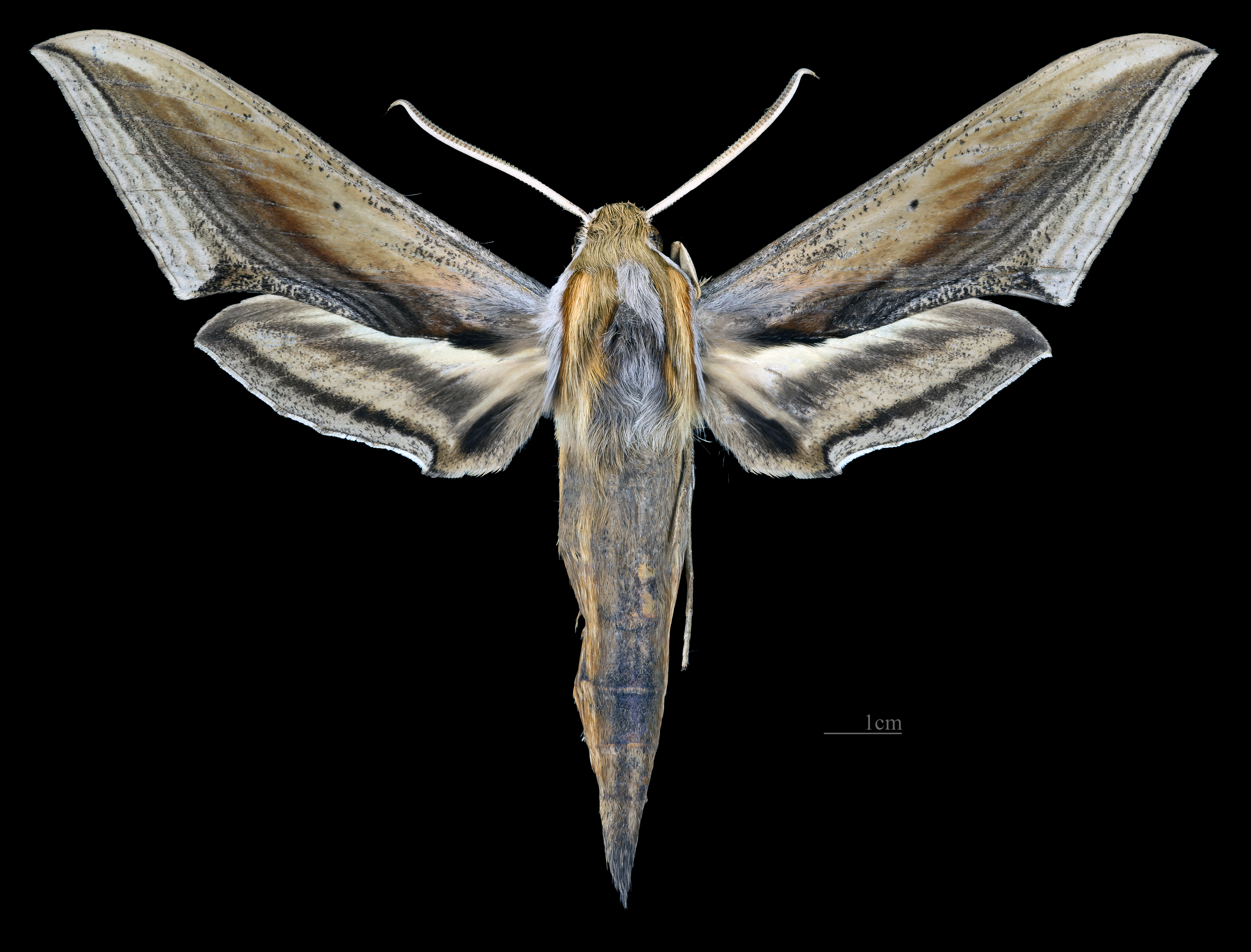
- Male dorsal
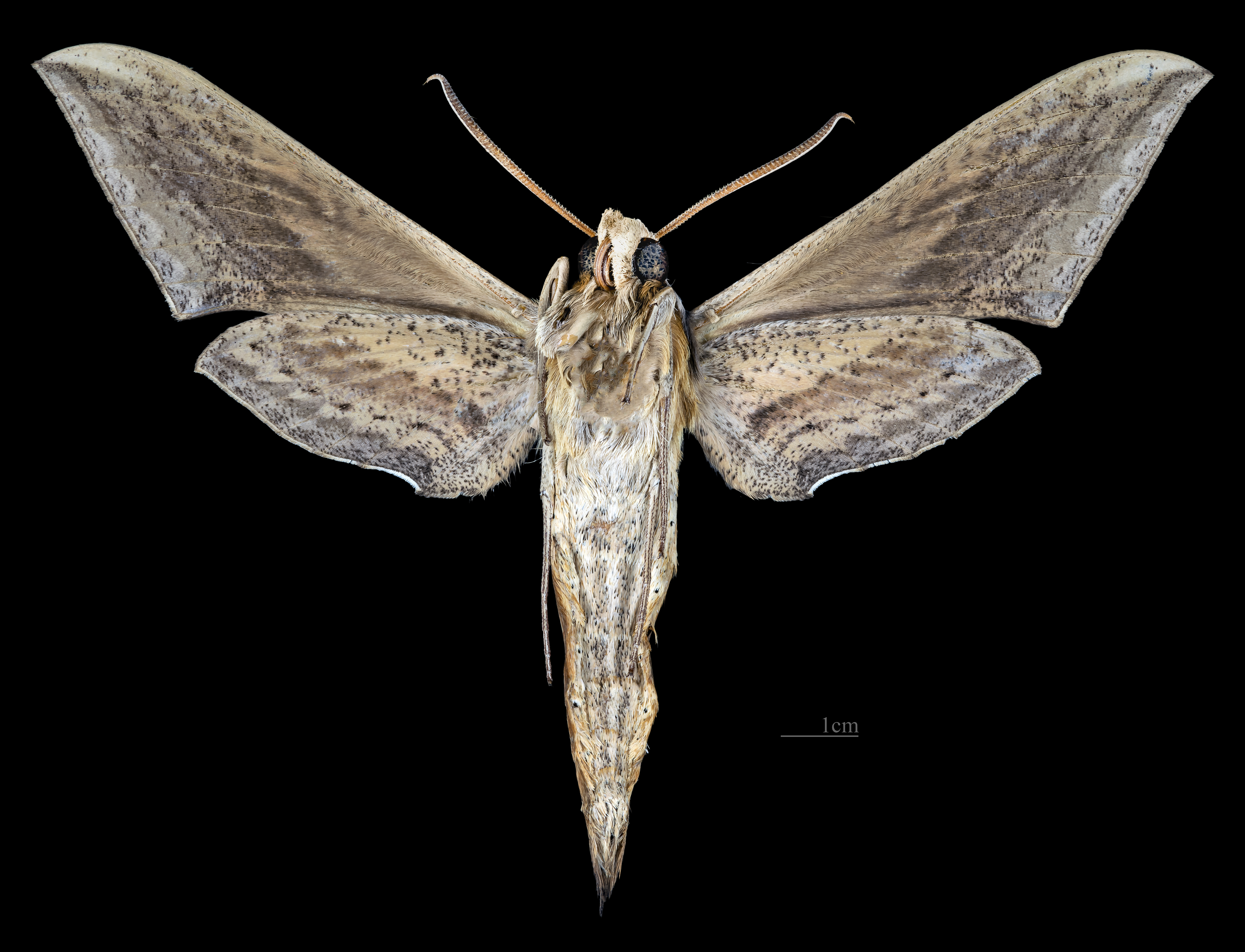
- Male ventral

Scientific classification
- Domain: Eukaryota
- Kingdom: Animalia
- Phylum: Arthropoda
- Class: Insecta
- Order: Lepidoptera
- Family: Sphingidae
- Genus: Xylophanes
- Species: X. falco

Binomial name
- Xylophanes falco (Walker, 1856)

Synonyms
- Chaerocampa falco Walker, 1856; Chaerocampa fugax Boisduval, 1870; Chaerocampa mexicana Erschoff, 1877

= Xylophanes falco =

Species of moth

Xylophanes falco is a moth of the family Sphingidae.

== Distribution ==
It is found from Honduras and Guatemala north through Mexico to southern Arizona and western Texas. It is generally found in oak woodland and along streamsides.

== Description ==
The wingspan is 70–80 millimetres (2.8–3.1 in). Adults are similar to Xylophanes monzoni but generally paler, with a less diffuse pattern and more falcate forewings. The abdomen has long, pale hair-like scales. The forewing upperside is pale brown-beige from the base to the apex with scattered black scales restricted to the leading edge anterior to the discal spot. The base of the wing has a pale purple suffusion and traces of two median lines running from the inner margin. There is a full complement of five dark brown postmedian and two submarginal lines, all sharply defined and converging to the apex. It is less contrastingly patterned than Xylophanes monzoni. The hindwing upperside ground colour is pale brown and the median band consists of two thin, straight, dark brown lines. The submarginal band is present and of similar colour and width to the two median lines, but it is distinctly darker than the grey marginal band.

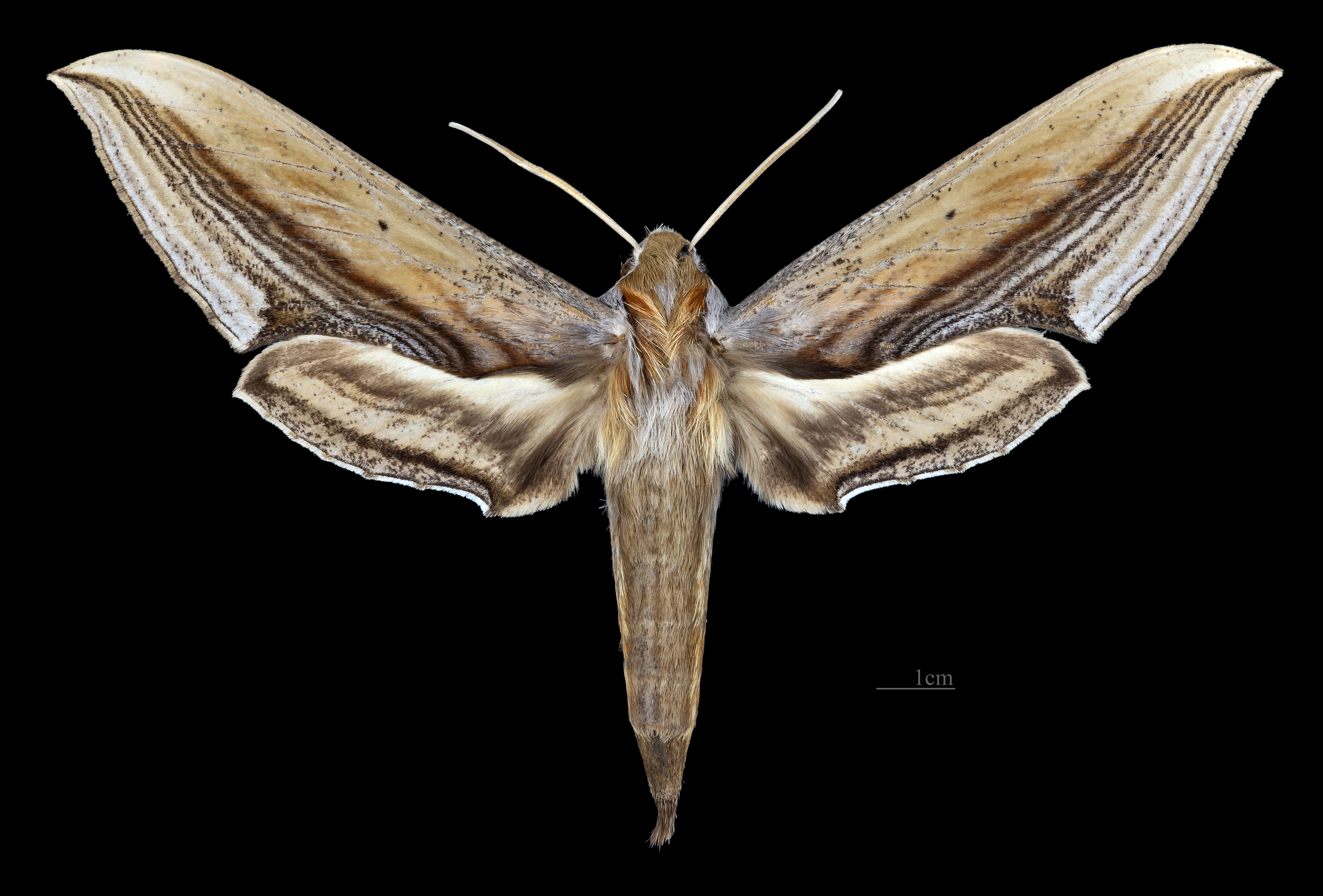
Female dorsal

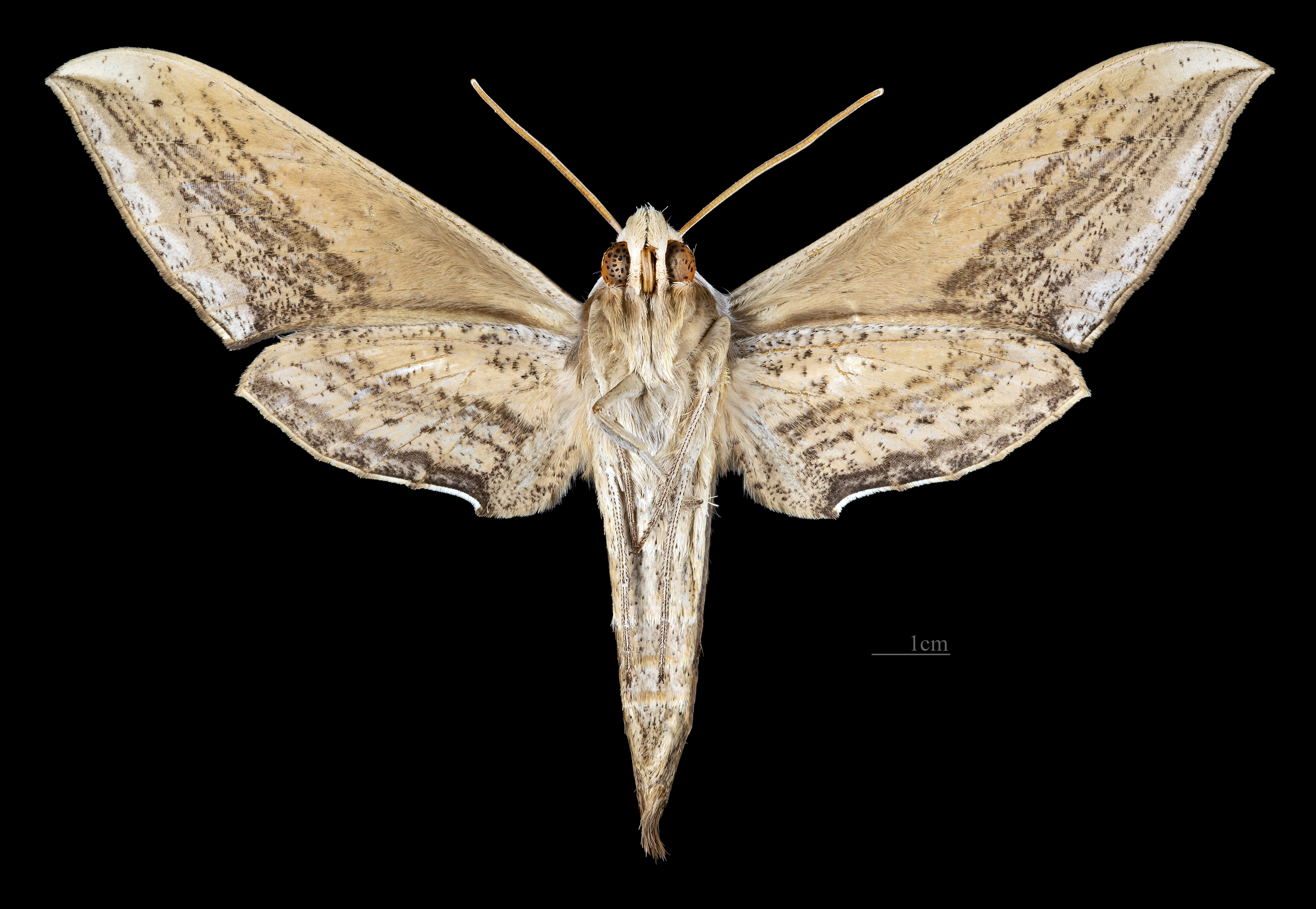
Female ventral

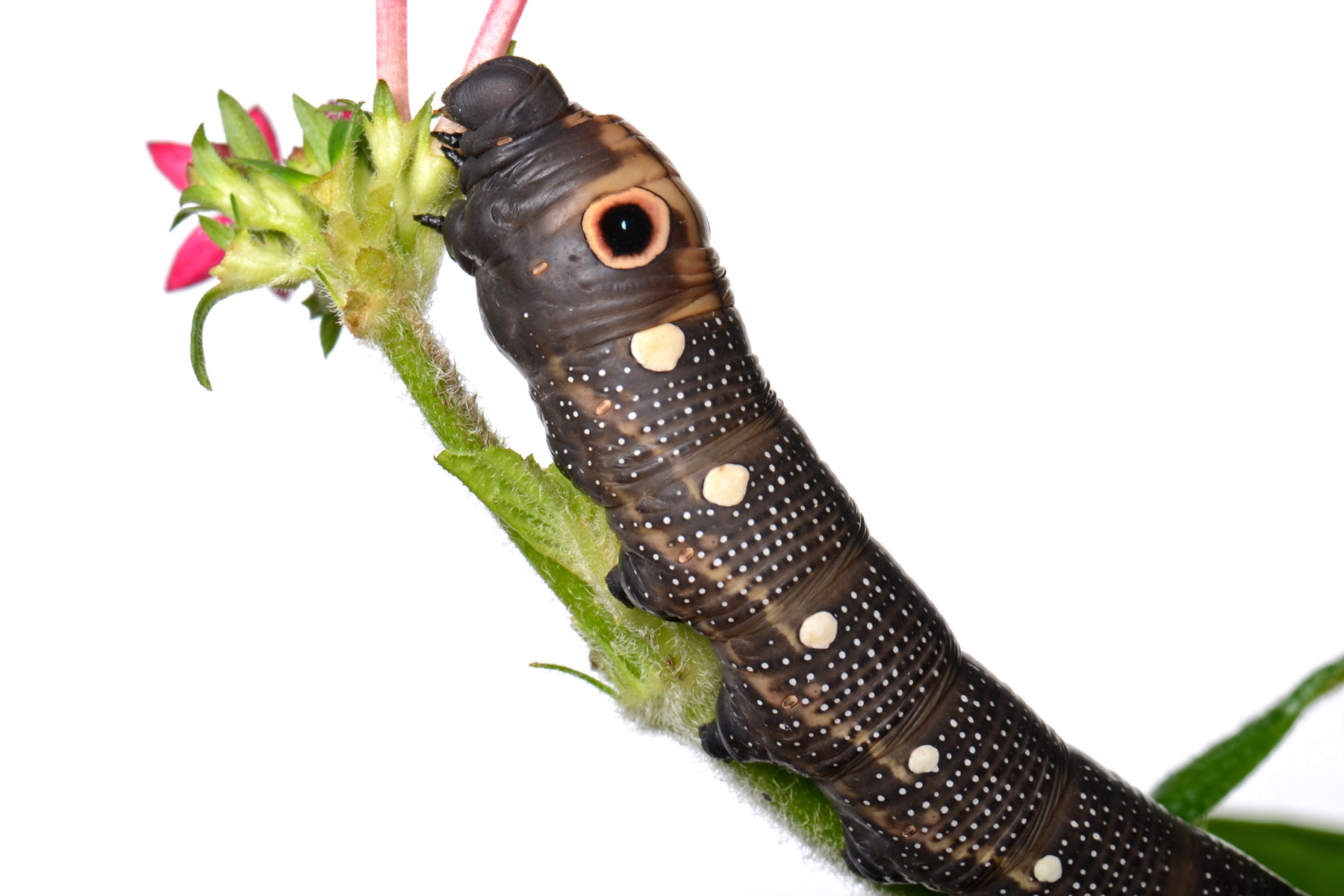
Caterpillar

== Ecology ==
The larvae possibly feed on Bouvardia glaberrima. There is a single large eye on the thorax and six white circles down the side of the caterpillar. There are also extensive bands of white dots girdling the abdomen. Adults are on wing from June to September in Arizona and continuously in the tropics.
