= Xylophanes monzoni =

- Xylophanes monzoni, female, underside

Scientific classification
- Kingdom: Animalia
- Phylum: Arthropoda
- Clade: Pancrustacea
- Class: Insecta
- Order: Lepidoptera
- Family: Sphingidae
- Genus: Xylophanes
- Species: X. monzoni

Binomial name
- Xylophanes monzoni Haxaire & Eitschberger, 2003

Species of moth

Xylophanes monzoni is a moth of the family Sphingidae. It is known from Guatemala.

The length of the forewings is about 41 millimetres (1.6 in).
