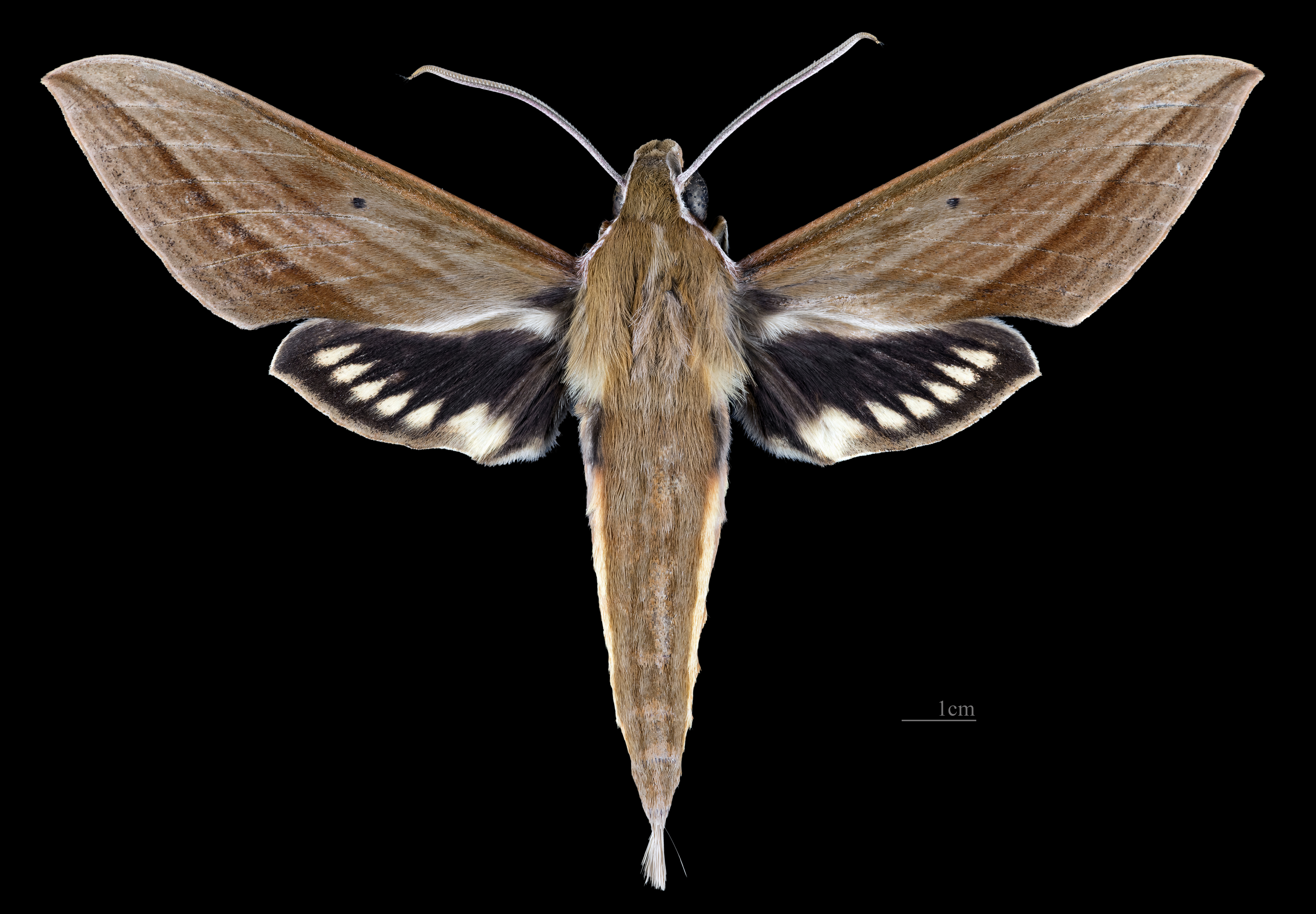
- Xylophanes sarae Male dorsal
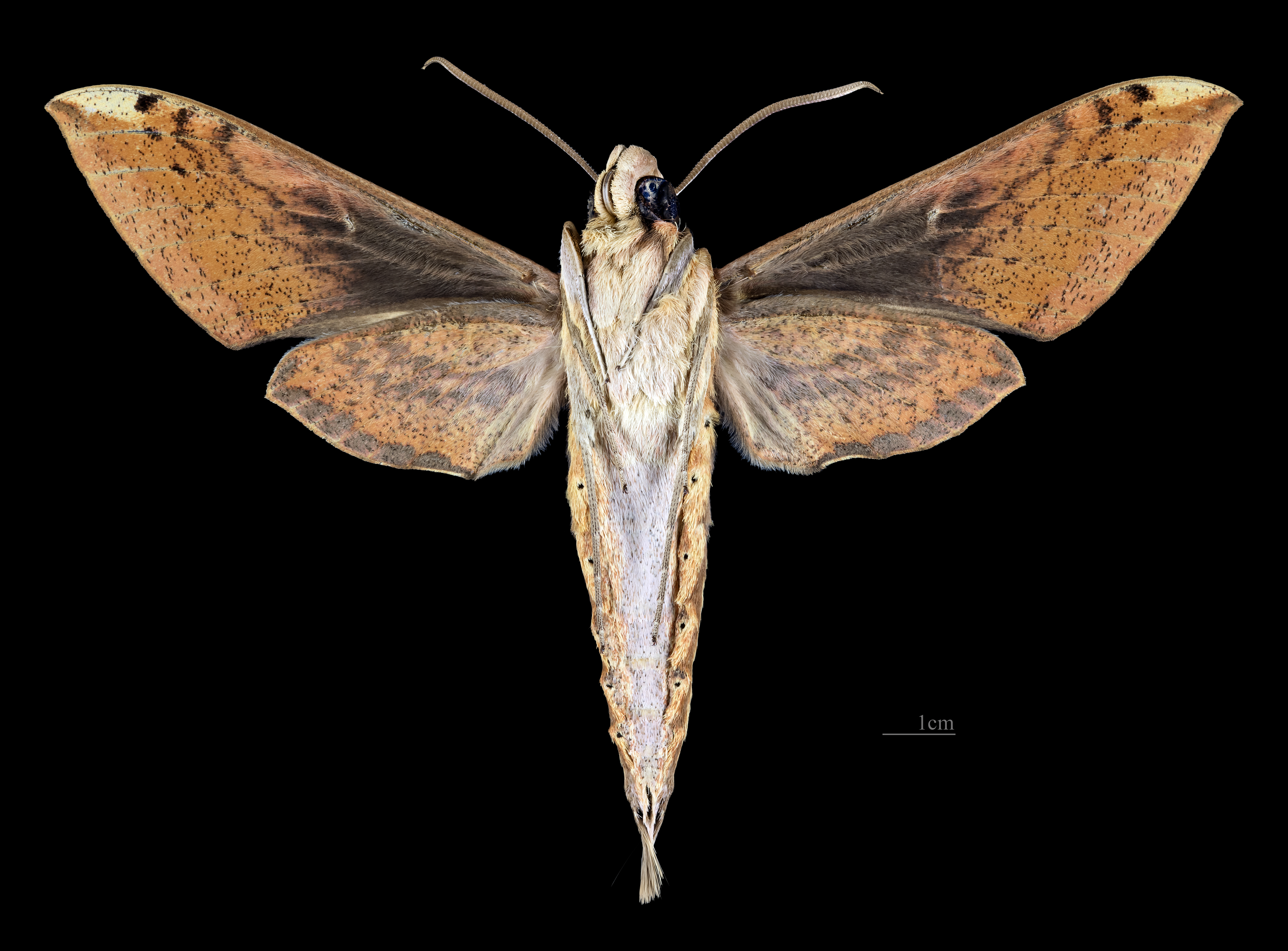
- Xylophanes sarae Male ventral

Scientific classification
- Domain: Eukaryota
- Kingdom: Animalia
- Phylum: Arthropoda
- Class: Insecta
- Order: Lepidoptera
- Family: Sphingidae
- Genus: Xylophanes
- Species: X. sarae

Binomial name
- Xylophanes sarae Haxaire, 1989

= Xylophanes sarae =

Species of moth

Xylophanes sarae is a moth of the family Sphingidae.

== Distribution ==
It is known from Venezuela.

== Description ==
The wingspan is 68–86 mm for males and 75–90 mm for females.

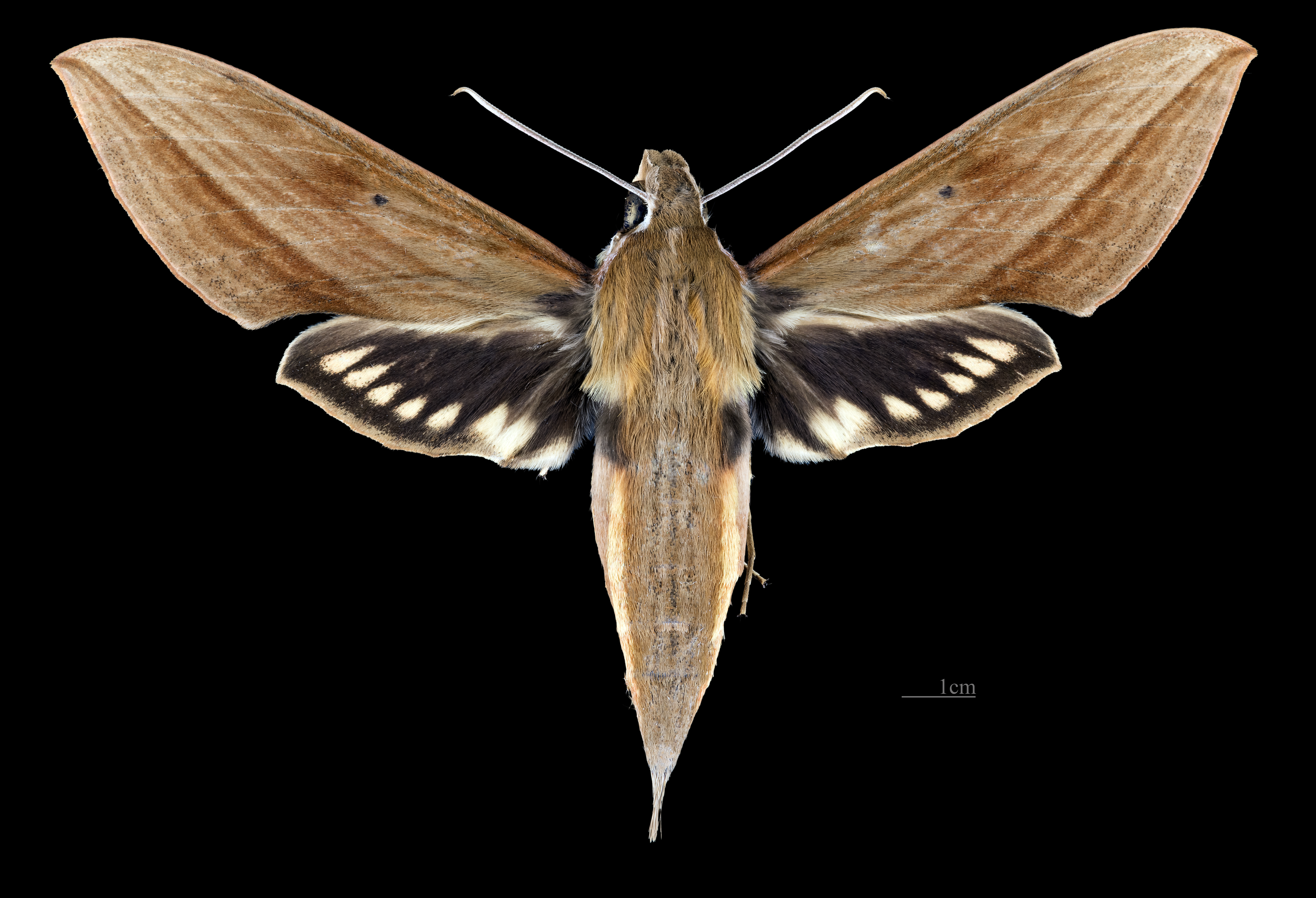
Xylophanes sarae female dorsal

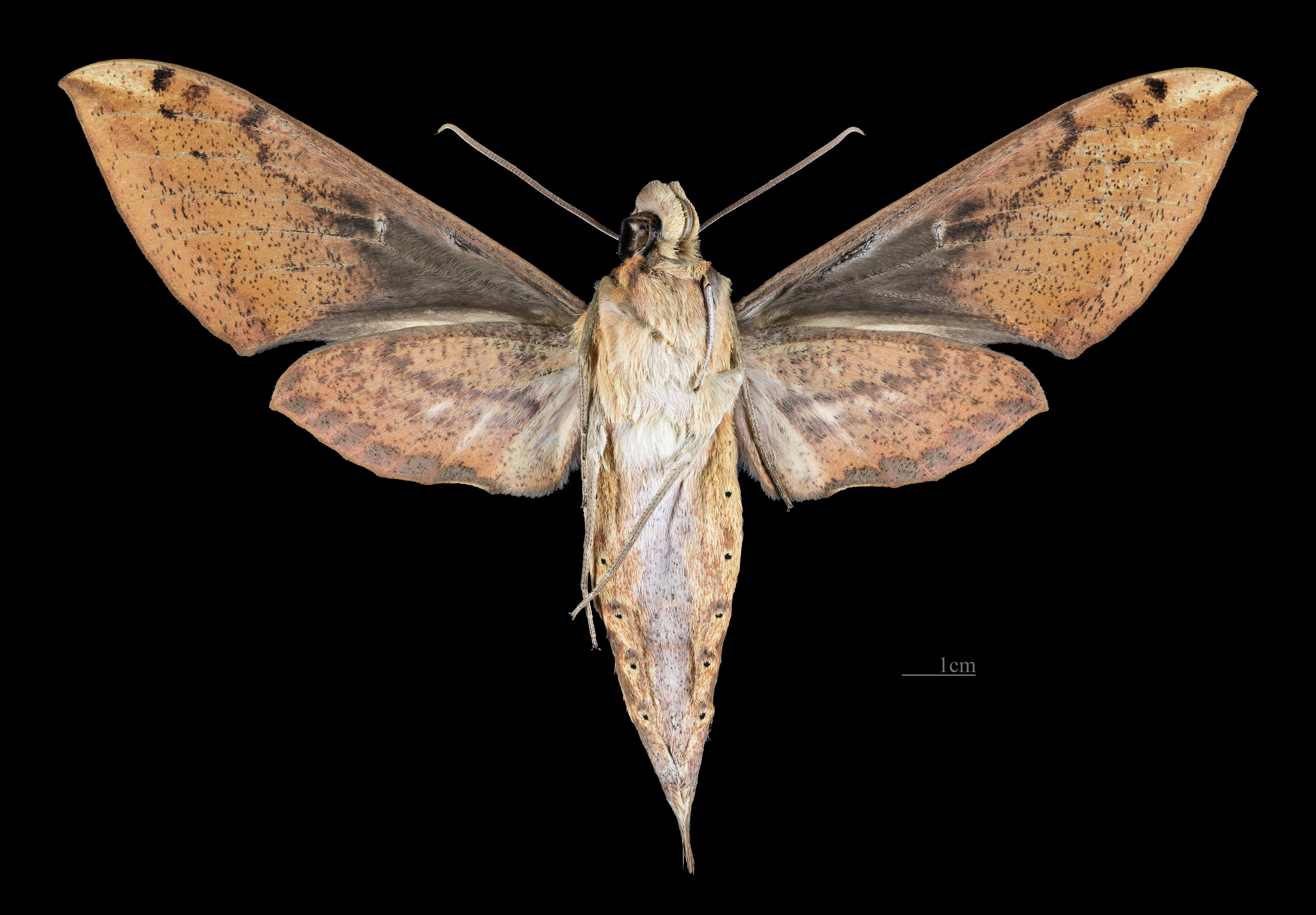
Xylophanes sarae female ventral

== Biology ==
Adults are probably on wing year-round.

The larvae probably feed on Rubiaceae and Malvaceae species.
