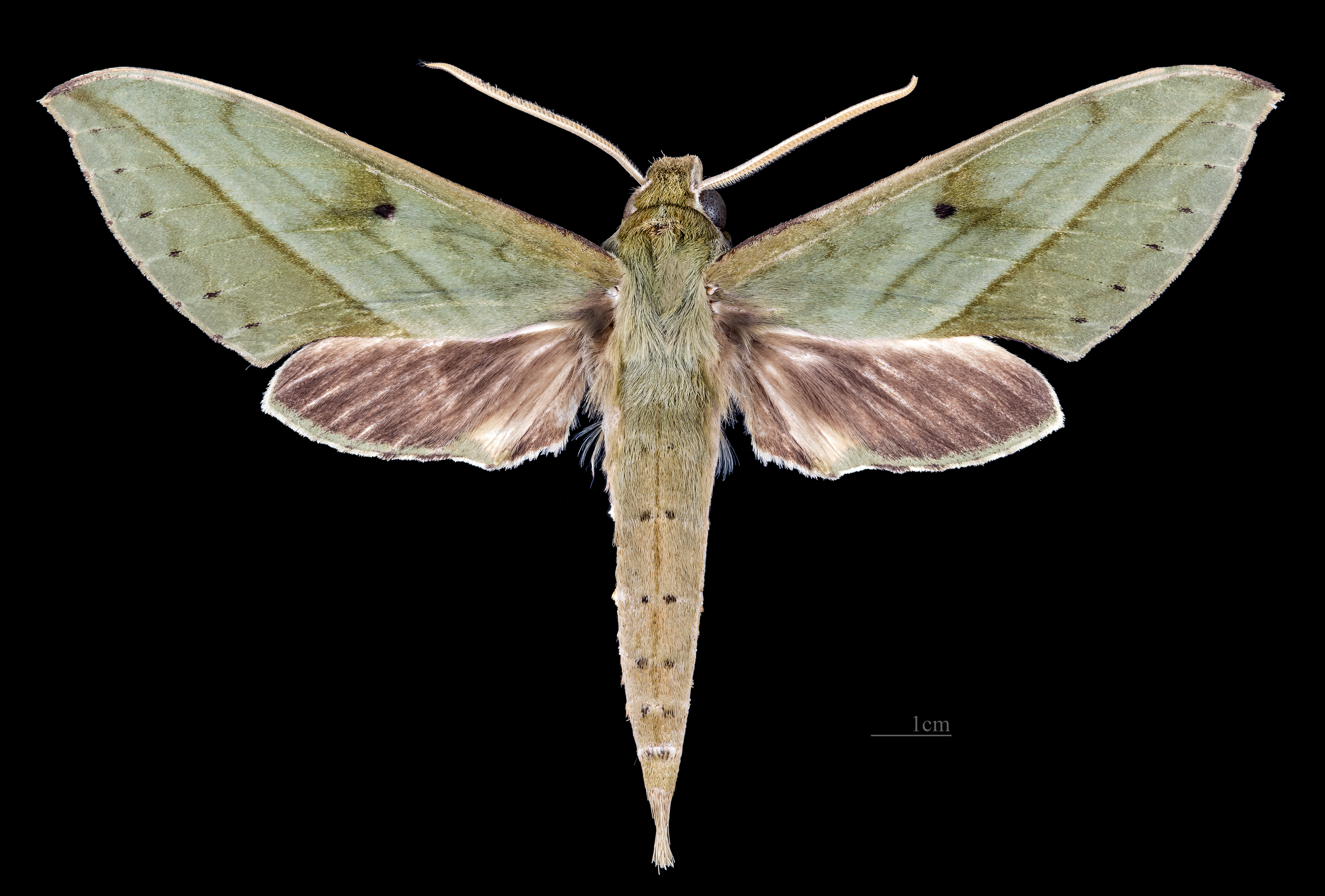
- Xylophanes fassli Male dorsal
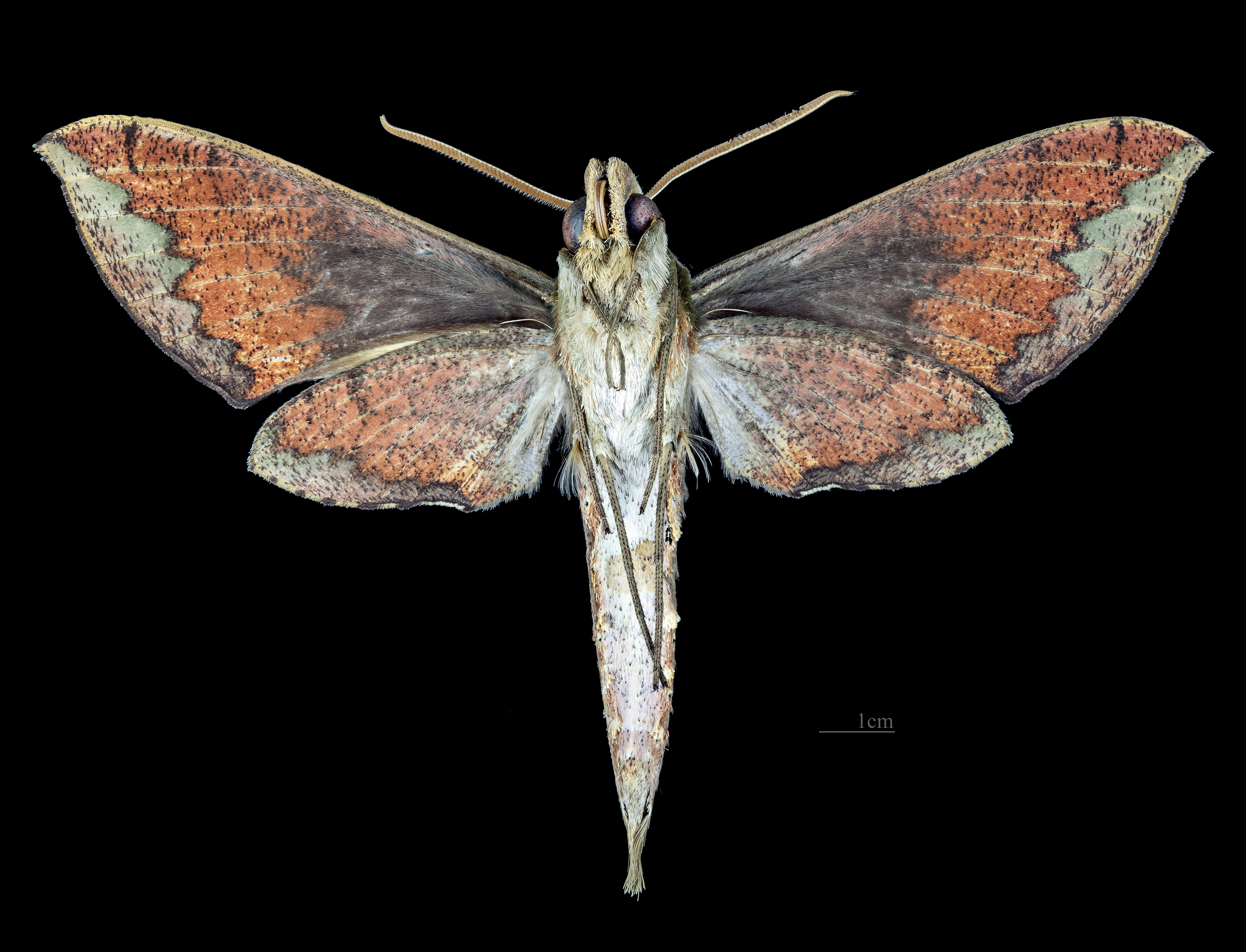
- Xylophanes fassli Male ventral

Scientific classification
- Domain: Eukaryota
- Kingdom: Animalia
- Phylum: Arthropoda
- Class: Insecta
- Order: Lepidoptera
- Family: Sphingidae
- Genus: Xylophanes
- Species: X. fassli

Binomial name
- Xylophanes fassli (Gehlen, 1928)

= Xylophanes fassli =

Species of moth

Xylophanes fassli is a moth of the family Sphingidae.

== Distribution ==
It is known from Bolivia.

== Description ==
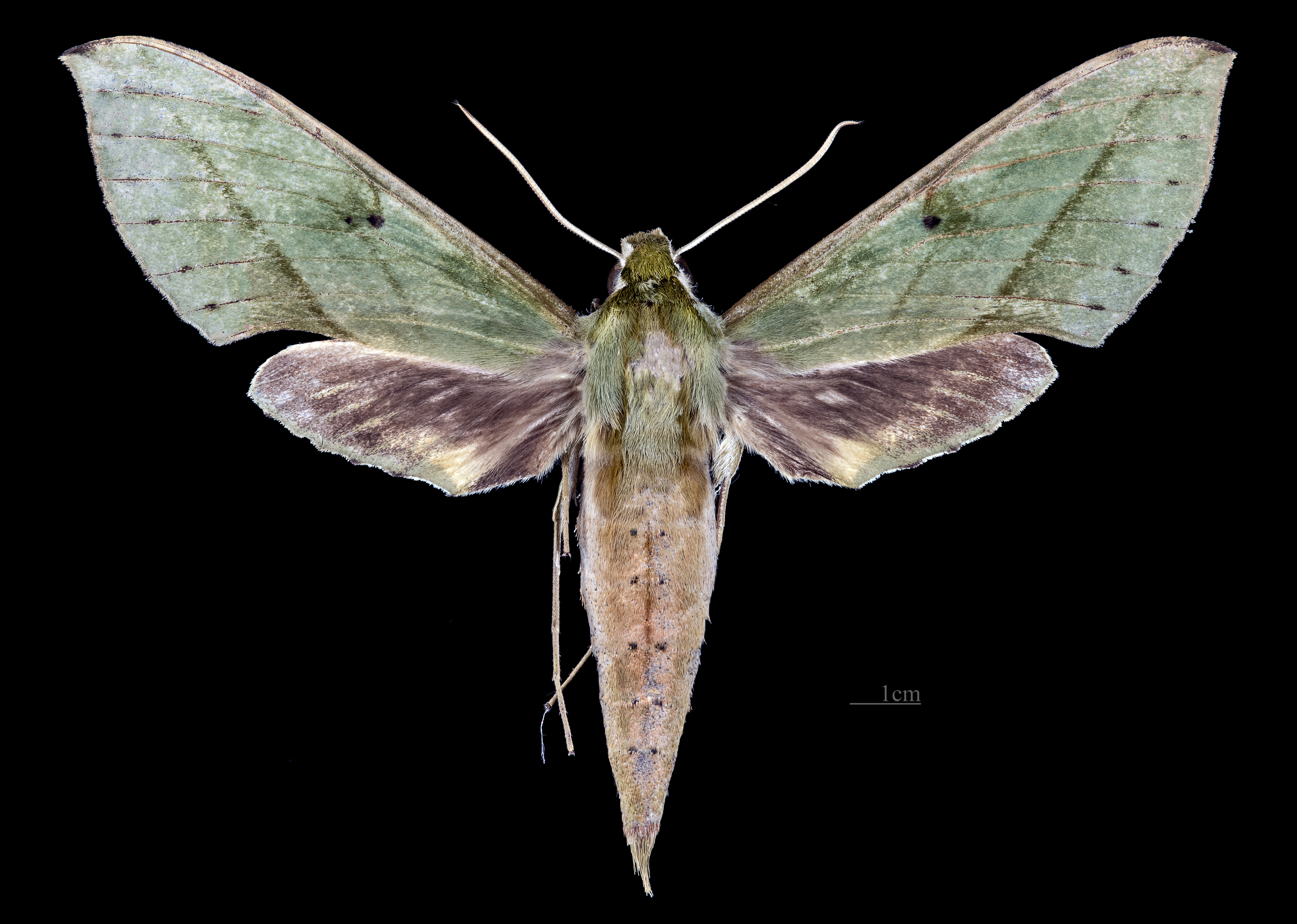
Female dorsal

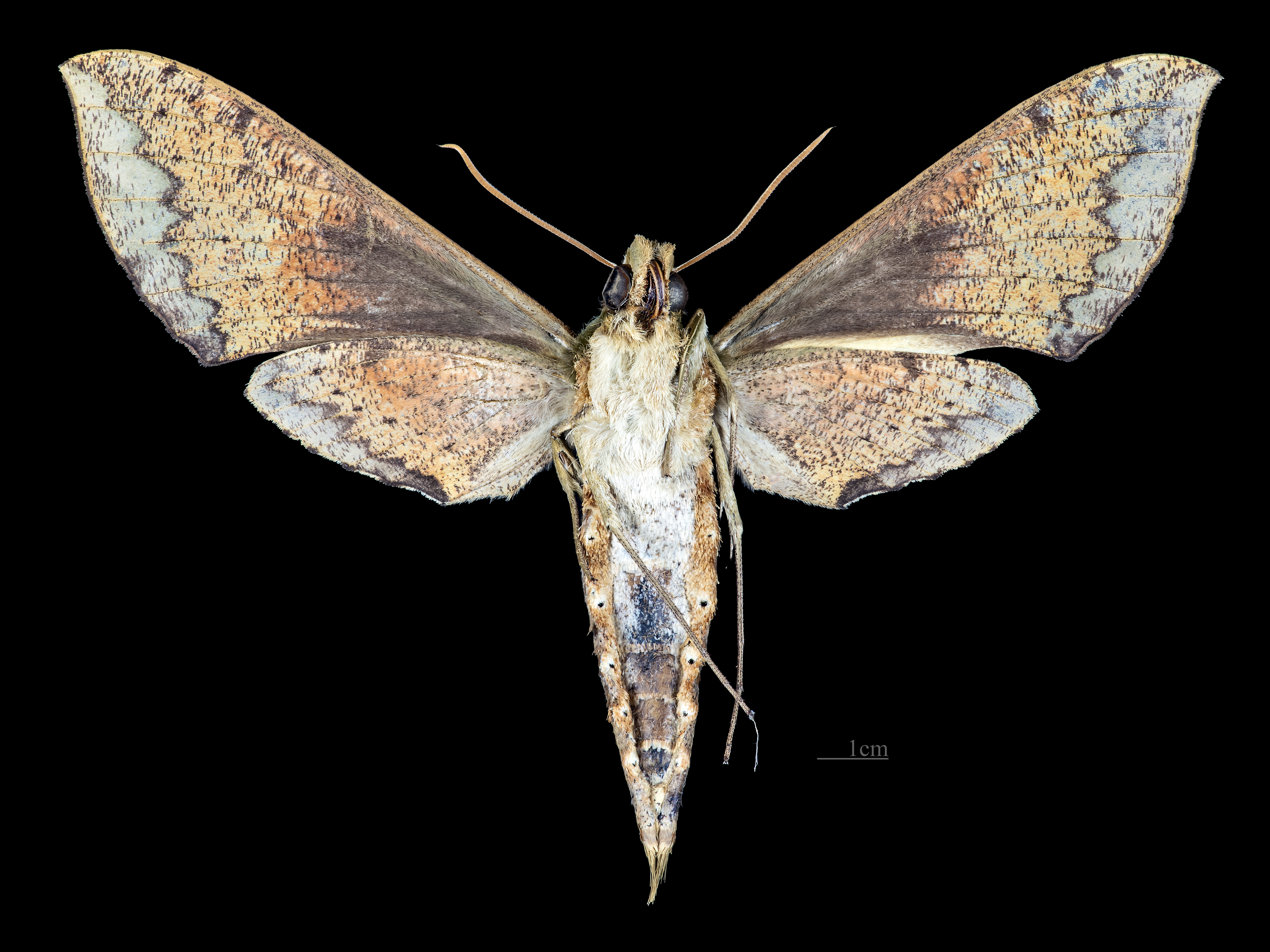
Female ventral

== Biology ==
The larvae probably feed on Rubiaceae and Malvaceae species.
