= Xylophanes blanca =

Scientific classification
- Kingdom: Animalia
- Phylum: Arthropoda
- Class: Insecta
- Order: Lepidoptera
- Family: Sphingidae
- Genus: Xylophanes
- Species: X. blanca

Binomial name
- Xylophanes blanca Eitschberger, 2001

Species of moth

Xylophanes blanca is a moth of the family Sphingidae. It is known from Peru.

The wingspan is 62–70 mm for males and about 71 mm for females. It is similar to Xylophanes rothschildi, but the oval patch distal to the discal spot is smaller and darker green and the postmedian line is narrower.
