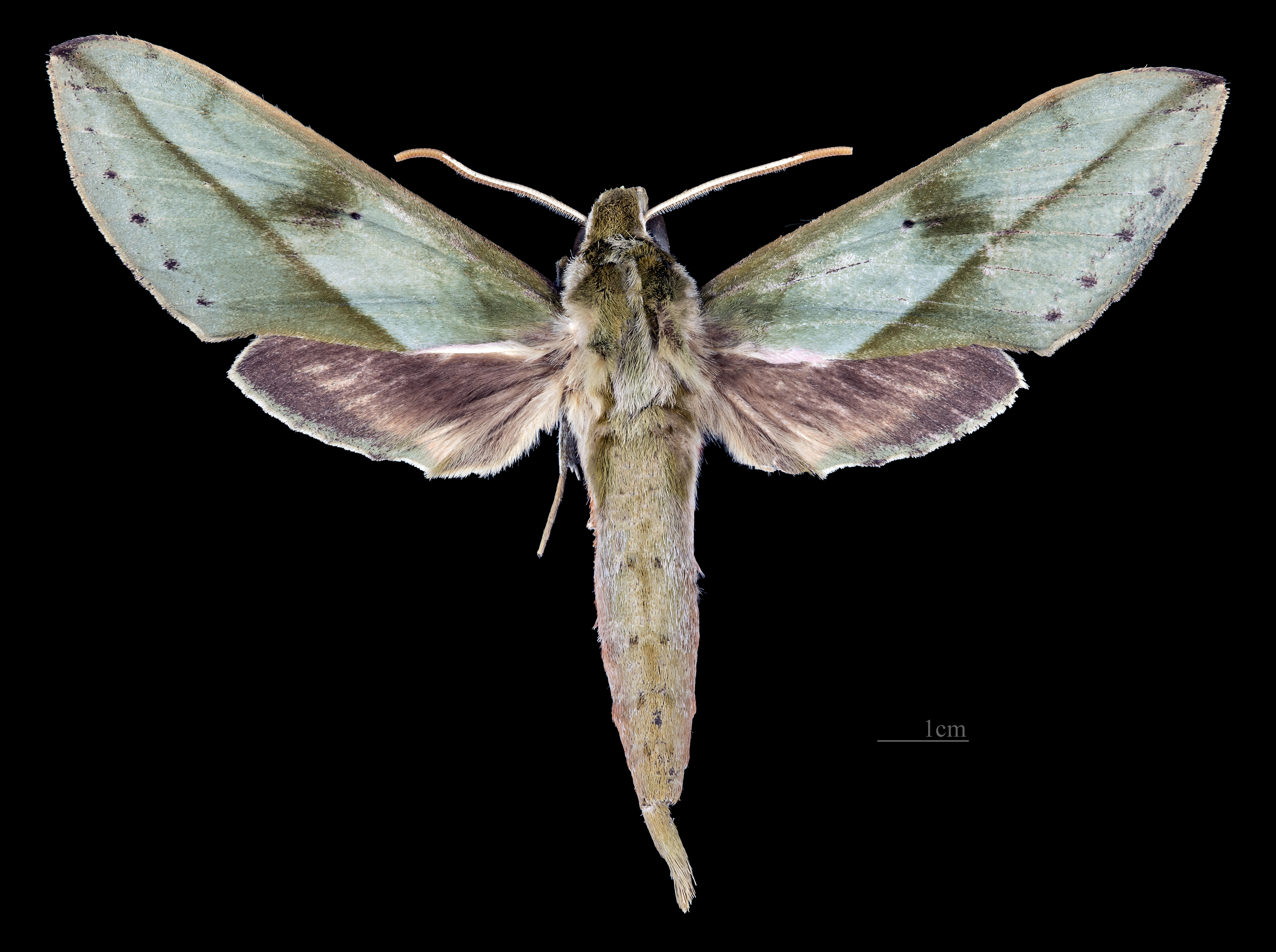
- Male dorsal
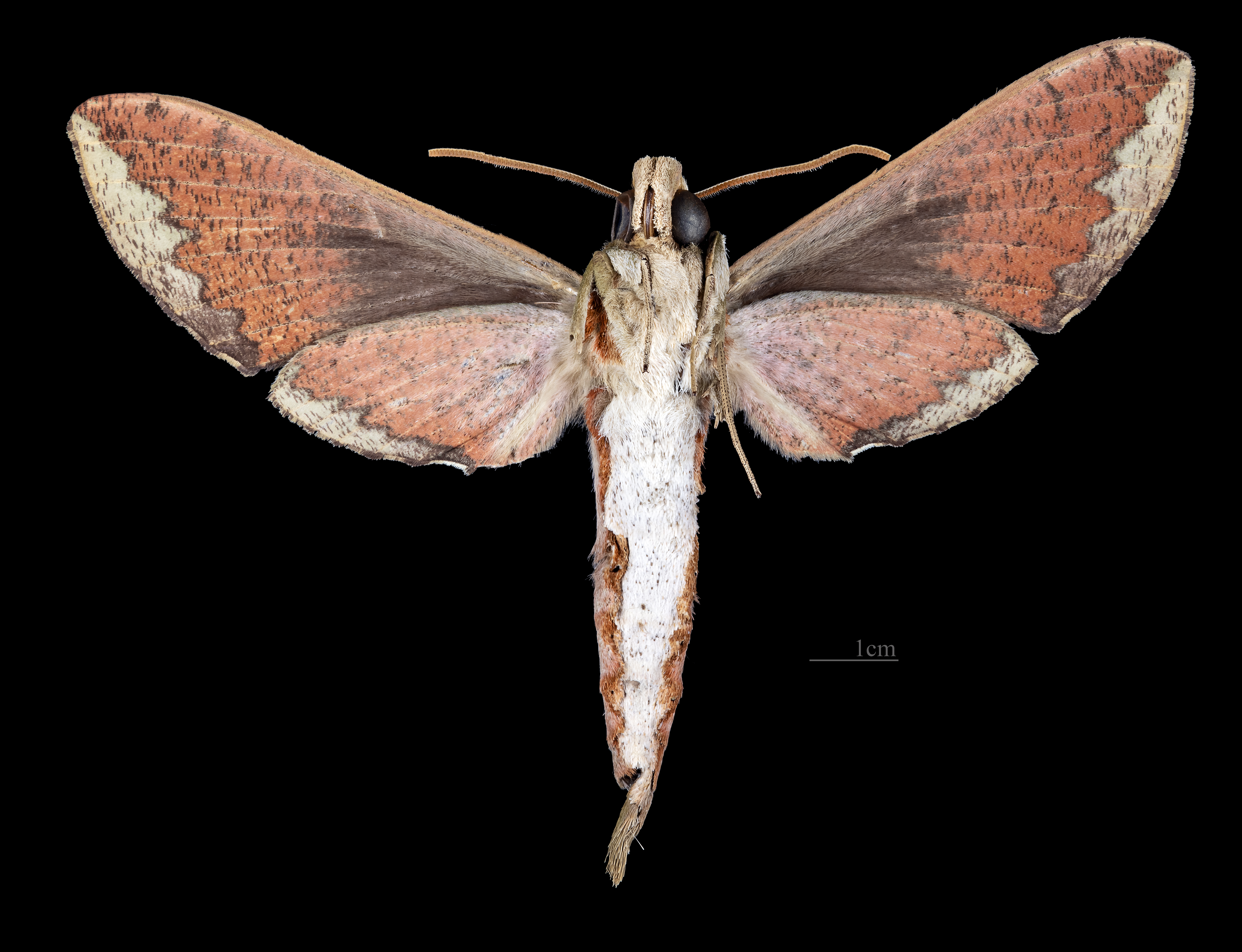
- Male ventral

Scientific classification
- Domain: Eukaryota
- Kingdom: Animalia
- Phylum: Arthropoda
- Class: Insecta
- Order: Lepidoptera
- Family: Sphingidae
- Subfamily: Macroglossinae
- Tribe: Macroglossini
- Subtribe: Choerocampina
- Genus: Xylophanes
- Species: X. rothschildi

Binomial name
- Xylophanes rothschildi (Dognin, 1895)

Synonyms
- Theretra rothschildi Dognin, 1895

= Xylophanes rothschildi =

Species of moth

Xylophanes rothschildi is a moth of the family Sphingidae. It is found from Colombia, Ecuador and Peru south to Bolivia.

The wingspan is 63–72 mm. The upperside of the forewings is dark green with a bluish glow. The base of the wings is also green, but has a deeper colour. The upperside of the hindwings is nearly black with an inconspicuous pinkish-orange median band.

The larvae probably feed on Rubiaceae and Malvaceae species.
