= Xylophanes mossi =

Scientific classification
- Domain: Eukaryota
- Kingdom: Animalia
- Phylum: Arthropoda
- Class: Insecta
- Order: Lepidoptera
- Family: Sphingidae
- Genus: Xylophanes
- Species: X. mossi

Binomial name
- Xylophanes mossi Clark, 1917

Species of moth

Xylophanes mossi is a moth of the family Sphingidae. It is known from Brazil.

It is similar to Xylophanes rufescens, but the forewing upperside is uniform rust-brown and all other pattern elements are reduced or absent.

Adults are probably on wing year-round.

The larvae probably feed on Rubiaceae and Malvaceae species.
