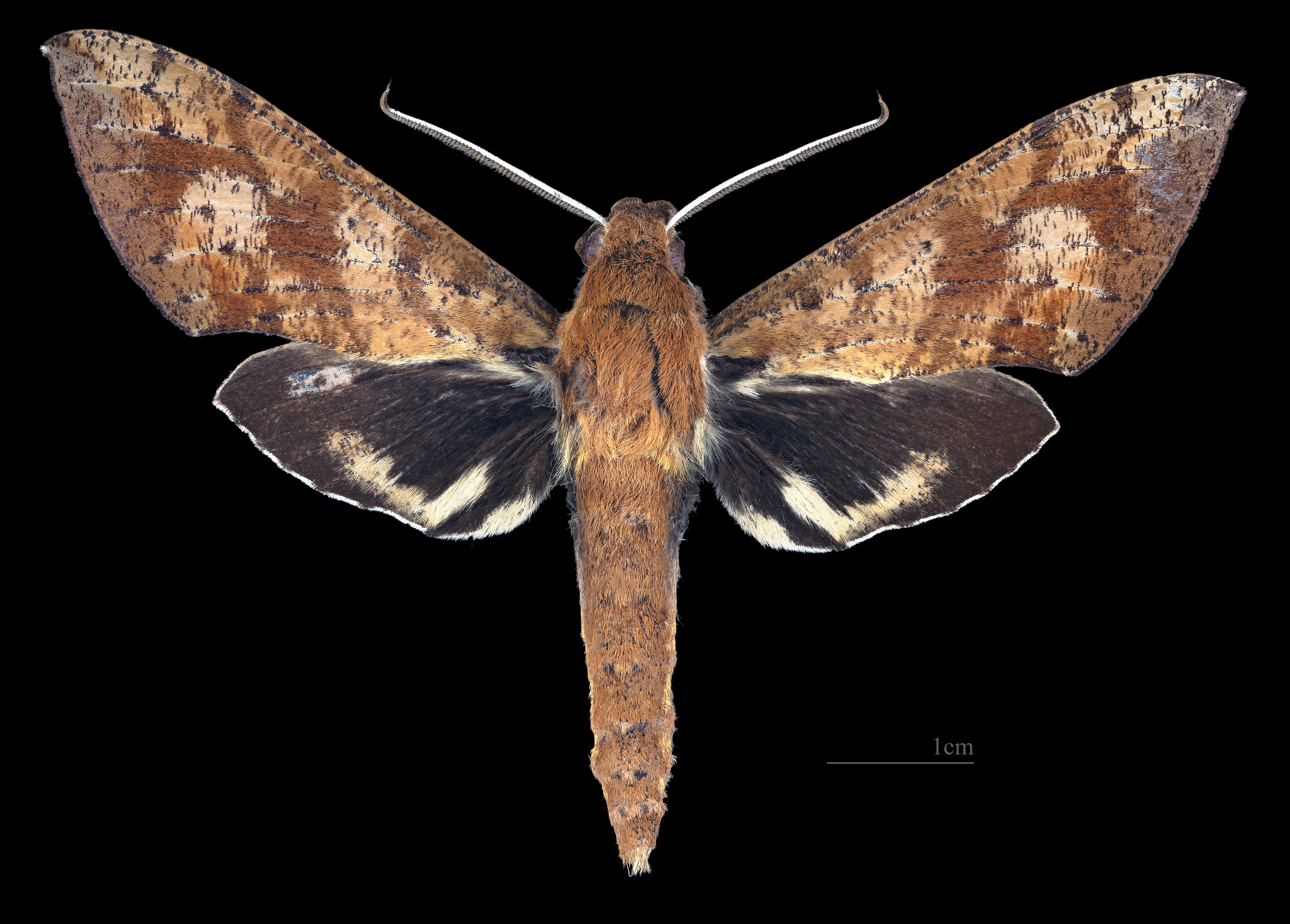
- Male dorsal
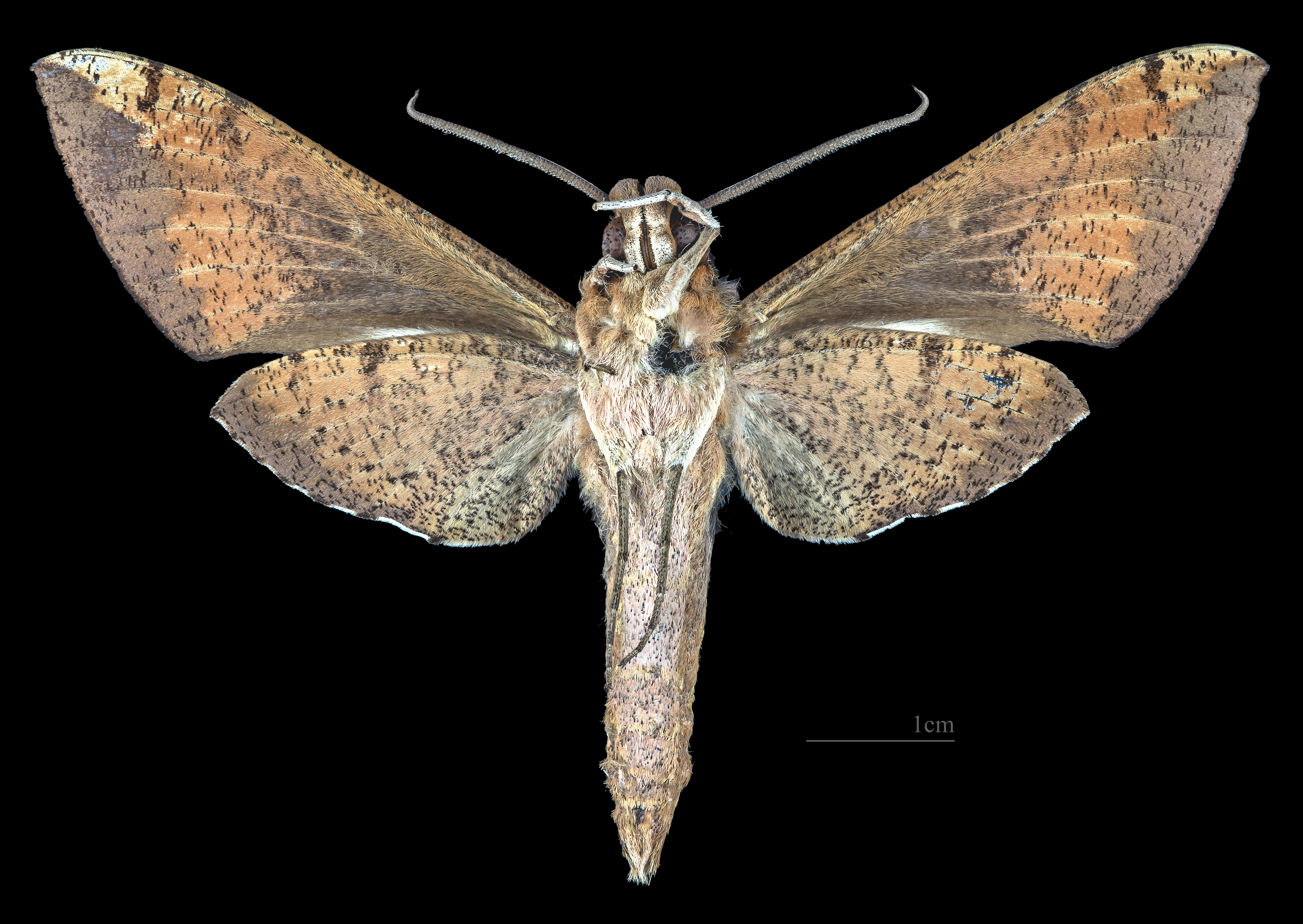
- Male ventral

Scientific classification
- Domain: Eukaryota
- Kingdom: Animalia
- Phylum: Arthropoda
- Class: Insecta
- Order: Lepidoptera
- Family: Sphingidae
- Genus: Xylophanes
- Species: X. rufescens

Binomial name
- Xylophanes rufescens (Rothschild, 1894)

Synonyms
- Theretra rufescens Rothschild, 1894

= Xylophanes rufescens =

Species of moth

Xylophanes rufescens is a moth of the family Sphingidae. It is known from French Guiana, Venezuela, north-western Brazil and eastern Peru.

Adults are probably on wing year-round.

The larvae probably feed on Rubiaceae and Malvaceae species.
