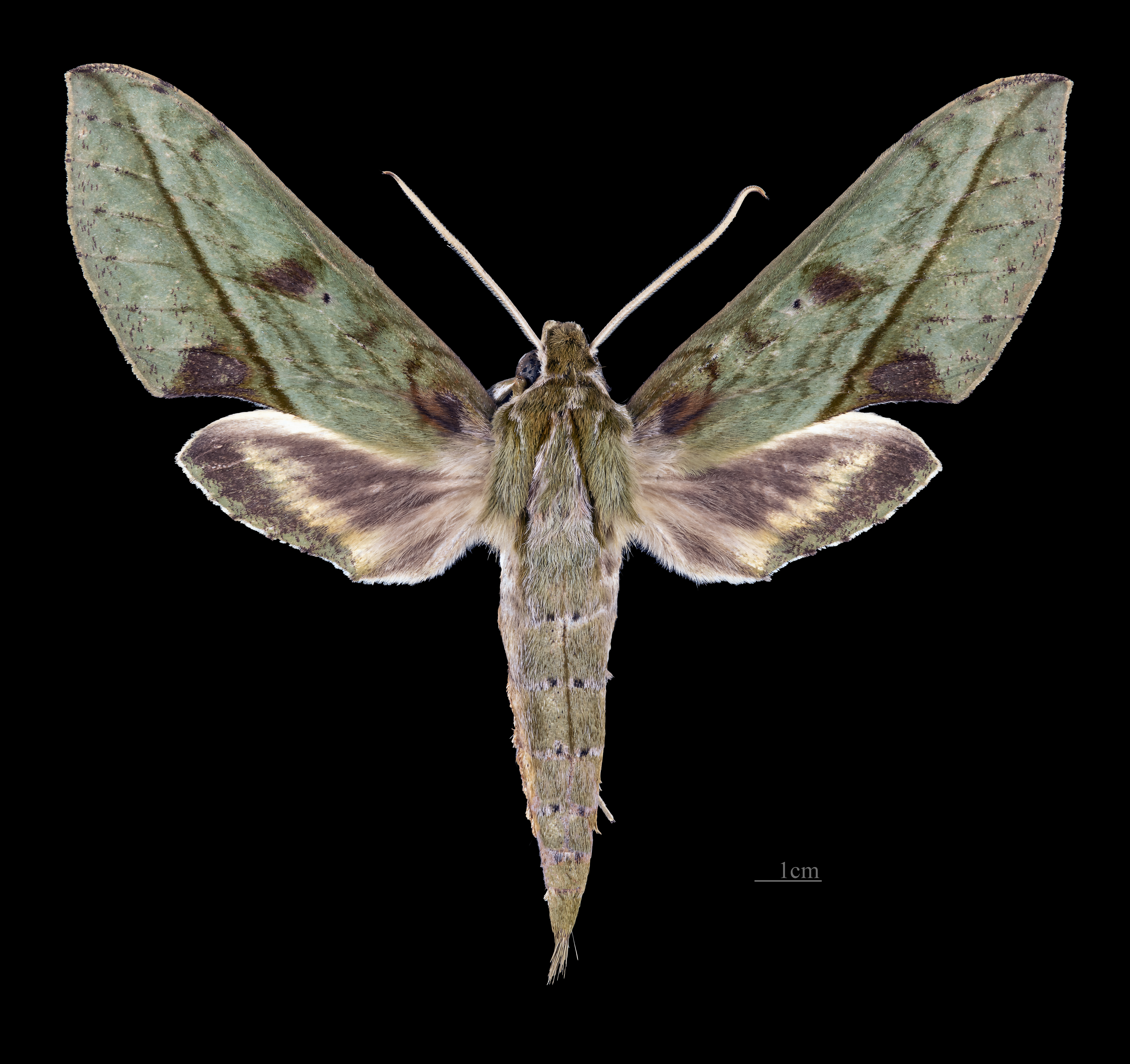
- Xylophanes ockendeni male recto MHNT

Scientific classification
- Kingdom: Animalia
- Phylum: Arthropoda
- Class: Insecta
- Order: Lepidoptera
- Family: Sphingidae
- Genus: Xylophanes
- Species: X. ockendeni

Binomial name
- Xylophanes ockendeni Rothschild, 1904

= Xylophanes ockendeni =

Species of moth

Xylophanes ockendeni is a moth of the family Sphingidae. It is known from Peru.

The length of the forewings is 35–36 mm.

The larvae probably feed on Rubiaceae and Malvaceae species.

== Subspecies ==
- Xylophanes ockendeni ockendeni (Peru)
- Xylophanes ockendeni sensu Eitschberger, 2001
