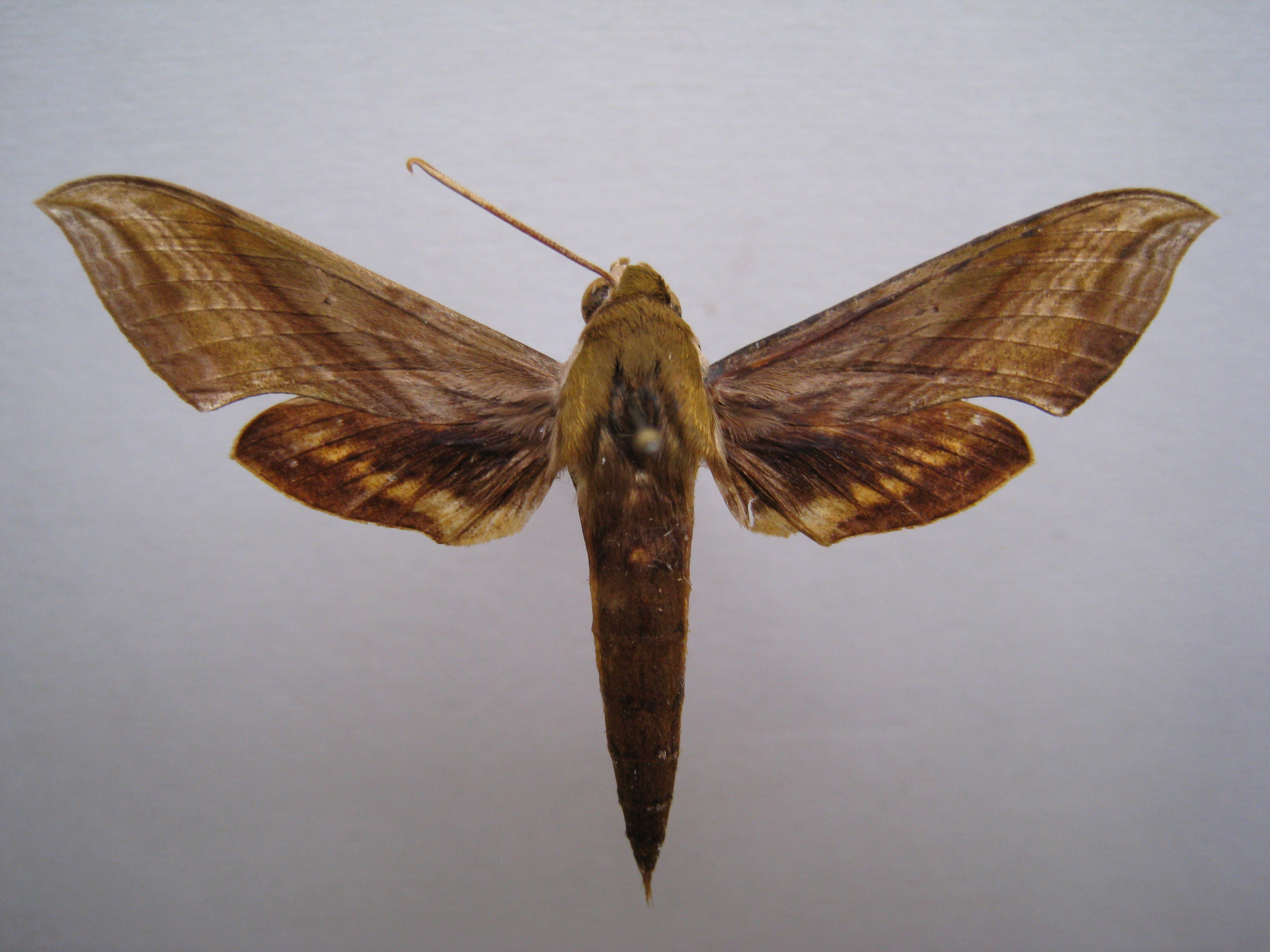

Scientific classification
- Domain: Eukaryota
- Kingdom: Animalia
- Phylum: Arthropoda
- Class: Insecta
- Order: Lepidoptera
- Family: Sphingidae
- Genus: Xylophanes
- Species: X. clarki

Binomial name
- Xylophanes clarki Ramsden, 1921

= Xylophanes clarki =

Species of moth

Xylophanes clarki is a moth of the family Sphingidae. It is known from Cuba, the Dominican Republic and Venezuela.

The length of the forewings is about 30 mm.

The larvae probably feed on Rubiaceae or Malvaceae species.
