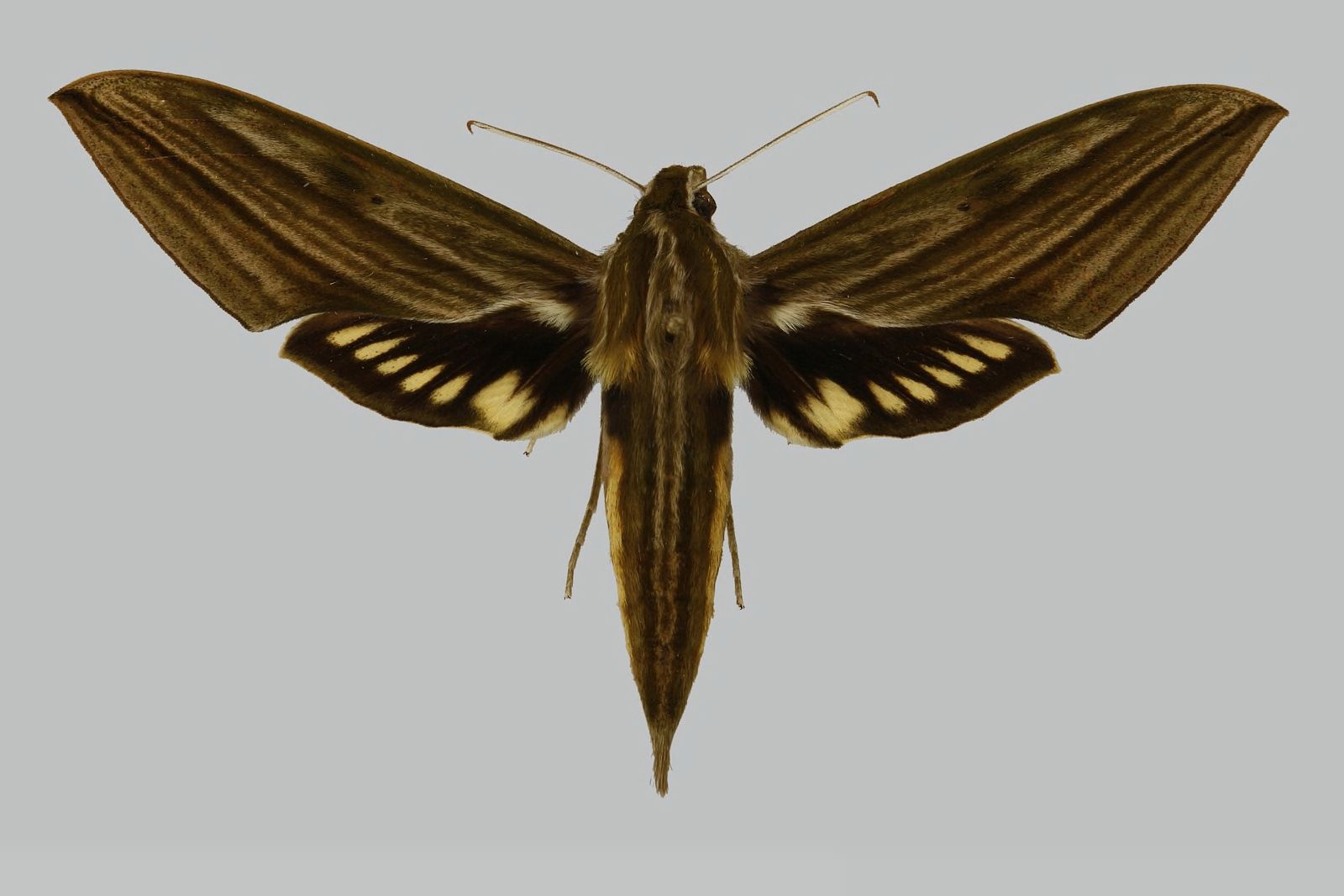

Scientific classification
- Kingdom: Animalia
- Phylum: Arthropoda
- Clade: Pancrustacea
- Class: Insecta
- Order: Lepidoptera
- Family: Sphingidae
- Genus: Xylophanes
- Species: X. mineti

Binomial name
- Xylophanes mineti Haxaire & Vaglia, 2004

= Xylophanes mineti =

Species of moth

Xylophanes mineti is a species of moth in the family Sphingidae. It is known from Ecuador and Bolivia.

== Subspecies ==
- Xylophanes mineti mineti
- Xylophanes mineti boliviana Haxaire & Vaglia, 2004 (Bolivia)
