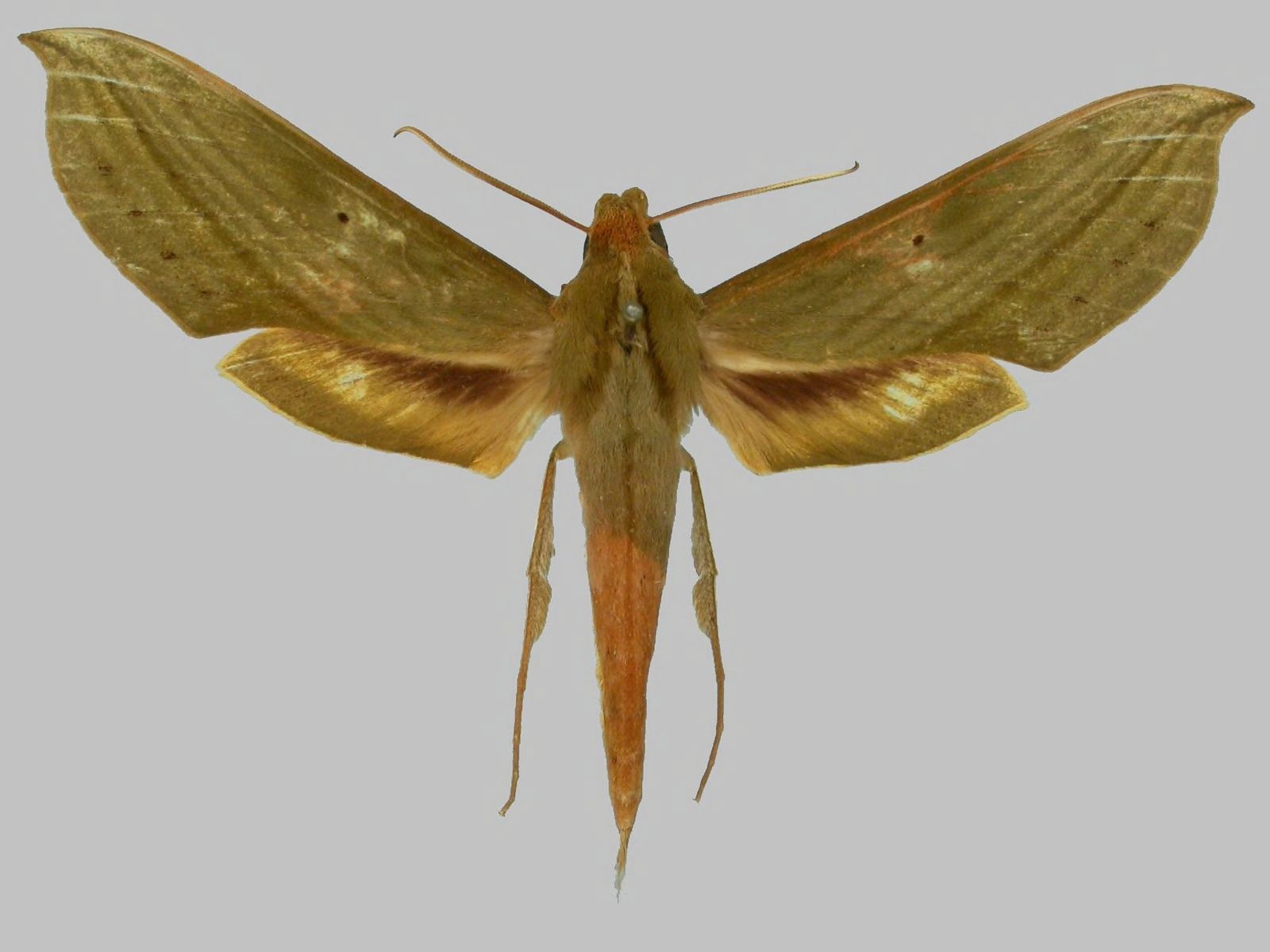

Scientific classification
- Domain: Eukaryota
- Kingdom: Animalia
- Phylum: Arthropoda
- Class: Insecta
- Order: Lepidoptera
- Family: Sphingidae
- Genus: Xylophanes
- Species: X. huloti

Binomial name
- Xylophanes huloti Haxaire & Vaglia, 2008

= Xylophanes huloti =

Species of moth

Xylophanes huloti is a moth of the family Sphingidae. It is known from Ecuador.
