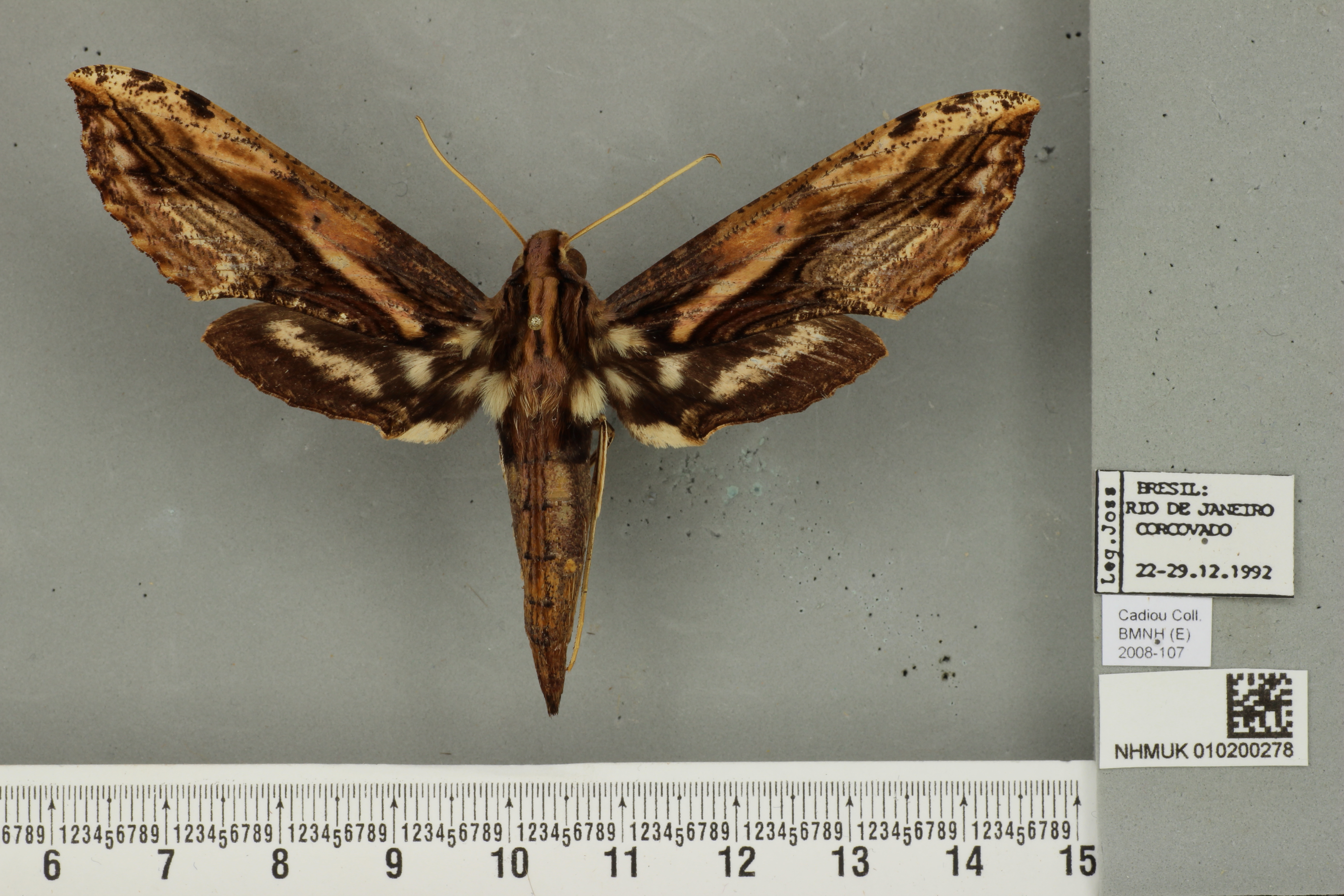

Scientific classification
- Domain: Eukaryota
- Kingdom: Animalia
- Phylum: Arthropoda
- Class: Insecta
- Order: Lepidoptera
- Family: Sphingidae
- Genus: Xylophanes
- Species: X. crenulata

Binomial name
- Xylophanes crenulata Vaglia & Haxaire, 2009

= Xylophanes crenulata =

Species of moth

Xylophanes crenulata is a moth of the family Sphingidae. It is found from Brazil, Paraguay and Argentina.
