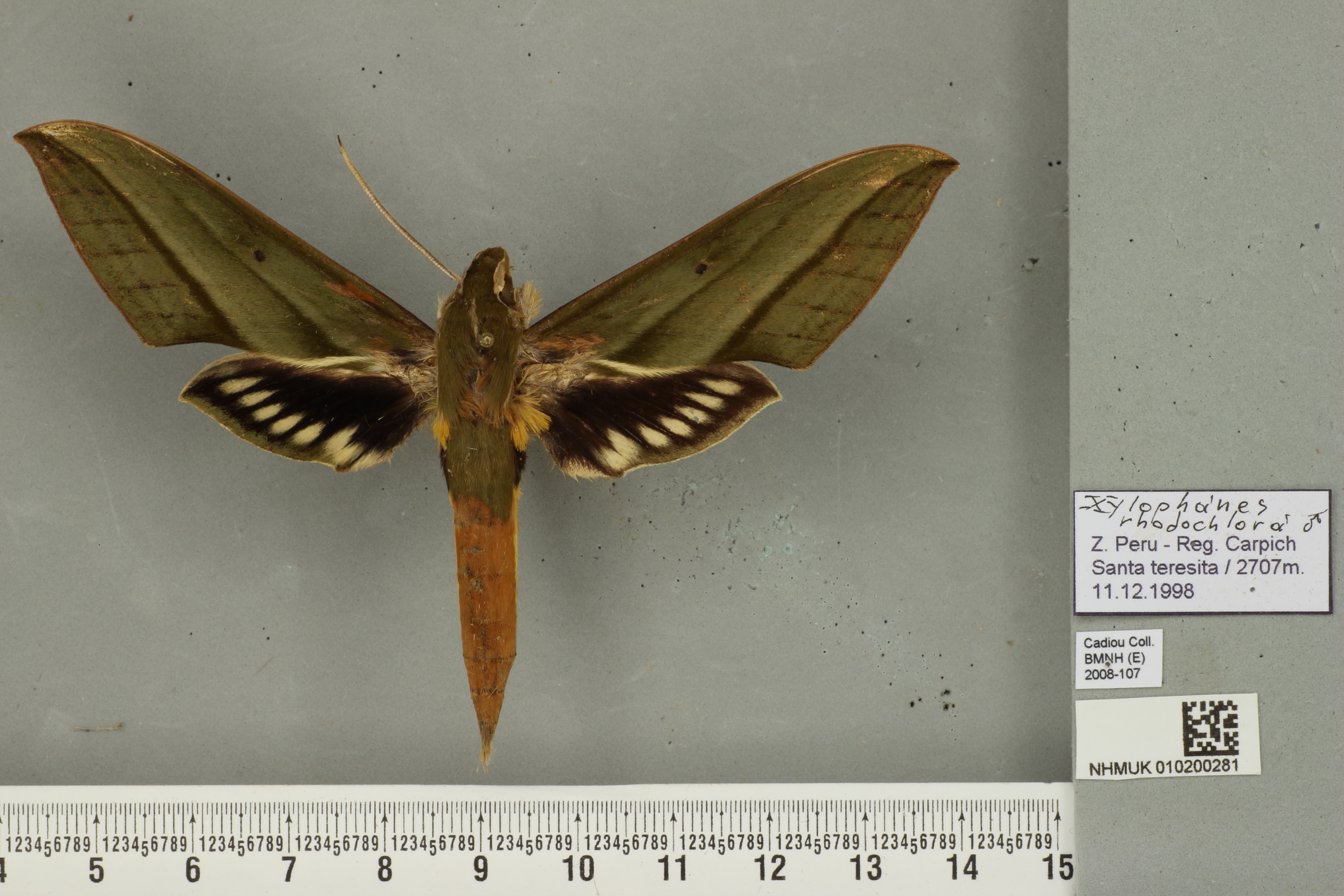

Scientific classification
- Domain: Eukaryota
- Kingdom: Animalia
- Phylum: Arthropoda
- Class: Insecta
- Order: Lepidoptera
- Family: Sphingidae
- Genus: Xylophanes
- Species: X. alexandrei

Binomial name
- Xylophanes alexandrei Haxaire & Vaglia, 2009

= Xylophanes alexandrei =

Species of moth

Xylophanes alexandrei is a moth of the family Sphingidae. It is known from Ecuador and Peru.
