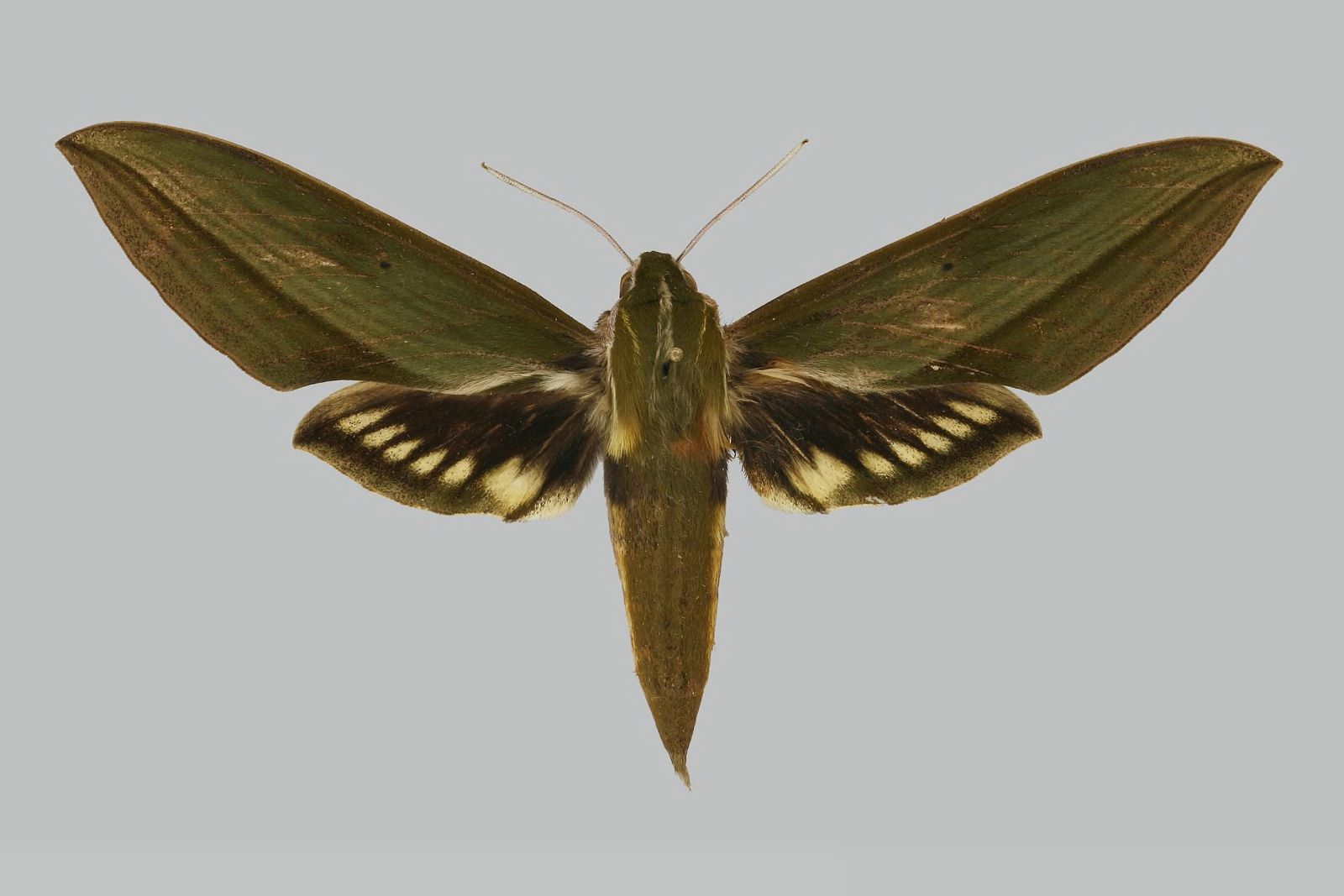

Scientific classification
- Domain: Eukaryota
- Kingdom: Animalia
- Phylum: Arthropoda
- Class: Insecta
- Order: Lepidoptera
- Family: Sphingidae
- Genus: Xylophanes
- Species: X. letiranti

Binomial name
- Xylophanes letiranti Vaglia & Haxaire, 2003

= Xylophanes letiranti =

Species of moth

Xylophanes letiranti is a moth of the family Sphingidae which can be found in Panama and Costa Rica.
