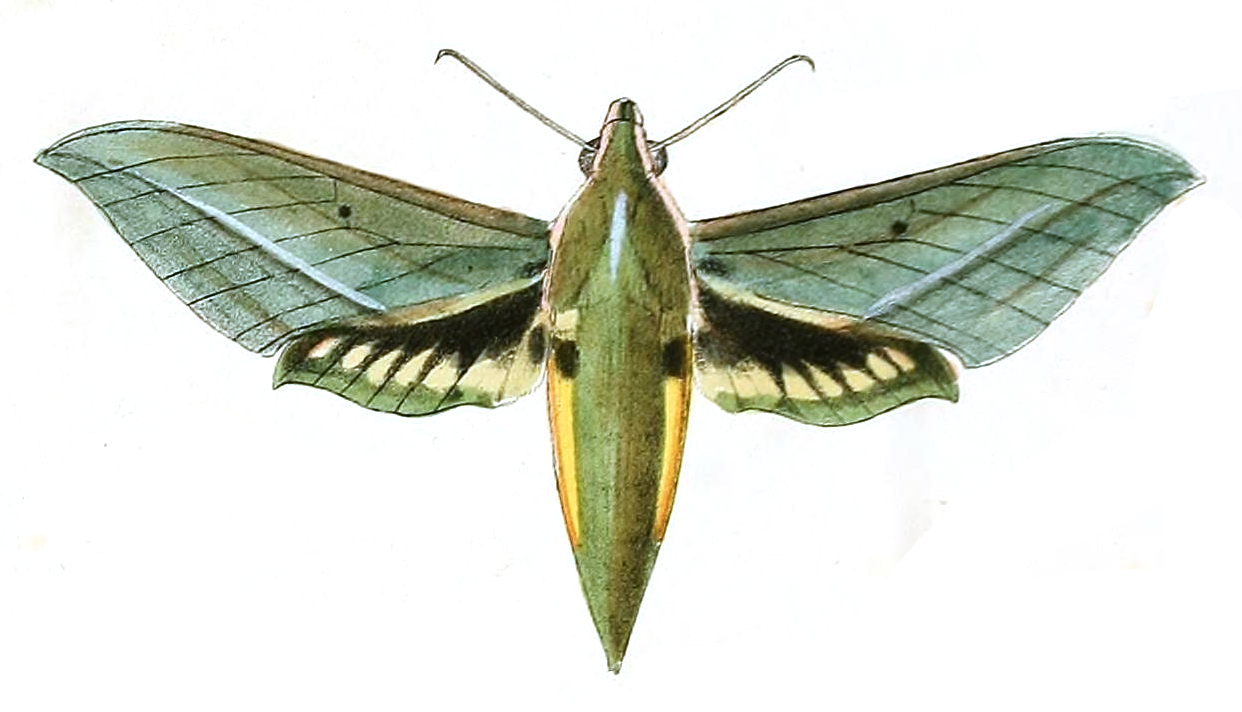

Scientific classification
- Domain: Eukaryota
- Kingdom: Animalia
- Phylum: Arthropoda
- Class: Insecta
- Order: Lepidoptera
- Family: Sphingidae
- Genus: Xylophanes
- Species: X. virescens

Binomial name
- Xylophanes virescens (Butler, 1875)

Synonyms
- Chaerocampa virescens Butler, 1875

= Xylophanes virescens =

Species of moth

Xylophanes virescens is a moth of the family Sphingidae. It is known from Colombia.
