= Xylophanes furtadoi =

Scientific classification
- Domain: Eukaryota
- Kingdom: Animalia
- Phylum: Arthropoda
- Class: Insecta
- Order: Lepidoptera
- Family: Sphingidae
- Genus: Xylophanes
- Species: X. furtadoi

Binomial name
- Xylophanes furtadoi Haxaire, 2009

Species of moth

Xylophanes furtadoi is a moth of the family Sphingidae. It is known from Brazil.

The length of the forewings is about 78 mm. There are probably at least three generations with adults recorded in June and October.

The larvae probably feed on Rubiaceae and Malvaceae species.
