= Xylophanes fernandezi =

Scientific classification
- Domain: Eukaryota
- Kingdom: Animalia
- Phylum: Arthropoda
- Class: Insecta
- Order: Lepidoptera
- Family: Sphingidae
- Genus: Xylophanes
- Species: X. fernandezi

Binomial name
- Xylophanes fernandezi Chacin, Clavijo & De Marmels, 1996

Species of moth

Xylophanes fernandezi is a moth of the family Sphingidae. It is known from Colombia and Venezuela.

The length of the forewings is 44–47 mm.

The larvae probably feed on Rubiaceae and Malvaceae species.
