= Xylophanes lolita =

Scientific classification
- Domain: Eukaryota
- Kingdom: Animalia
- Phylum: Arthropoda
- Class: Insecta
- Order: Lepidoptera
- Family: Sphingidae
- Genus: Xylophanes
- Species: X. lolita

Binomial name
- Xylophanes lolita Haxaire & Vaglia, 2008

Species of moth

Xylophanes lolita is a moth of the family Sphingidae first described by Jean Haxaire and Thierry Vaglia in 2008.
