= Xylophanes porioni =

Scientific classification
- Kingdom: Animalia
- Phylum: Arthropoda
- Clade: Pancrustacea
- Class: Insecta
- Order: Lepidoptera
- Family: Sphingidae
- Genus: Xylophanes
- Species: X. porioni

Binomial name
- Xylophanes porioni Cadiou, 2000

Species of moth

Xylophanes porioni is a moth of the family Sphingidae. It is known from Peru.

The length of the forewings is 39–40 mm.
