= Xylophanes lissyi =

Scientific classification
- Kingdom: Animalia
- Phylum: Arthropoda
- Class: Insecta
- Order: Lepidoptera
- Family: Sphingidae
- Genus: Xylophanes
- Species: X. lissyi

Binomial name
- Xylophanes lissyi Eitschberger, 2001

Species of moth

Xylophanes lissyi is a moth of the family Sphingidae. It is known from Peru.
