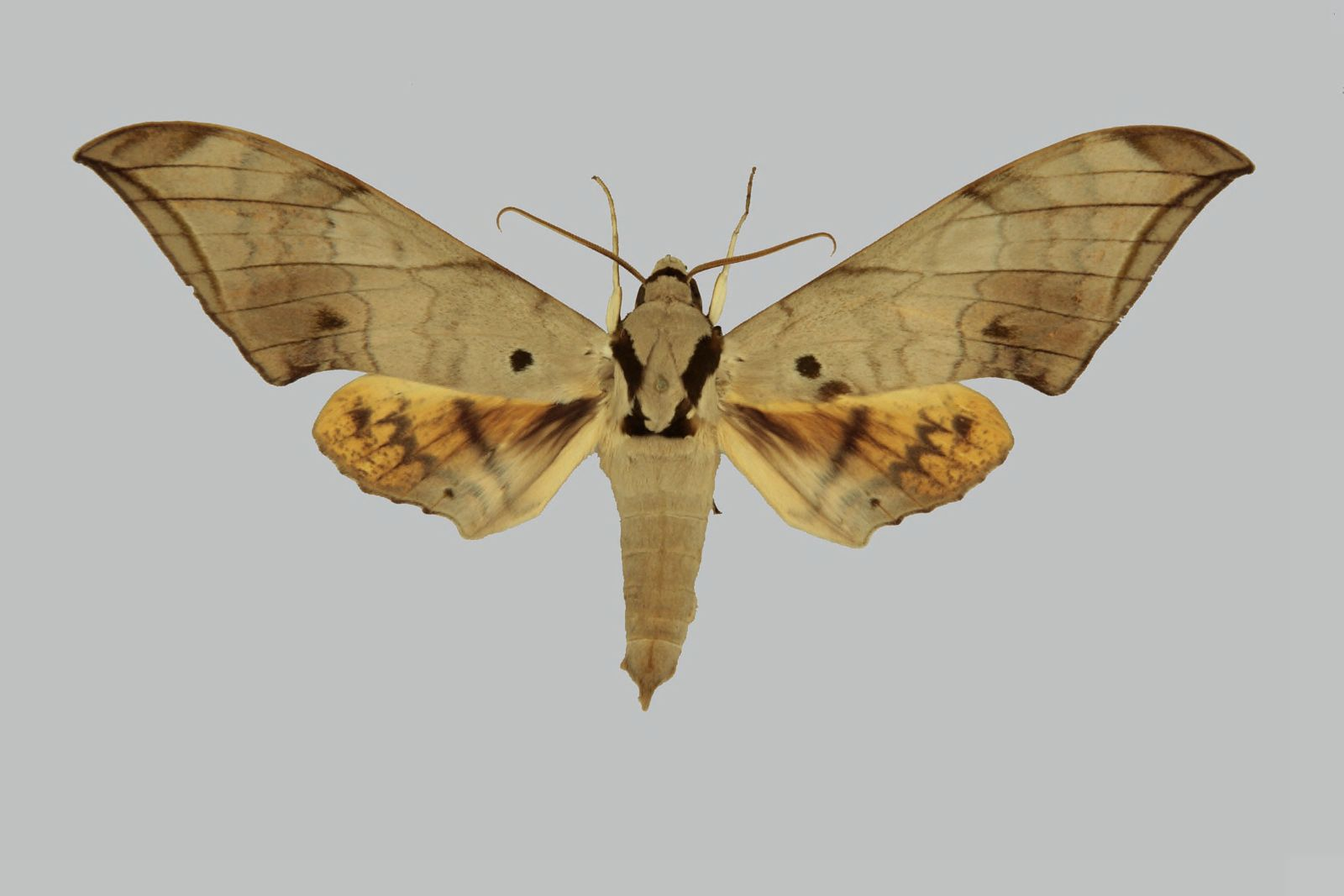
- Male

Scientific classification
- Kingdom: Animalia
- Phylum: Arthropoda
- Class: Insecta
- Order: Lepidoptera
- Family: Sphingidae
- Genus: Ambulyx
- Species: A. andangi

Binomial name
- Ambulyx andangi Brechlin, 1998

= Ambulyx andangi =

Species of moth

Ambulyx andangi is a species of moth in the family Sphingidae. It was described by Ronald Brechlin, in 1998, and is known from the Moluccas in Indonesia.
