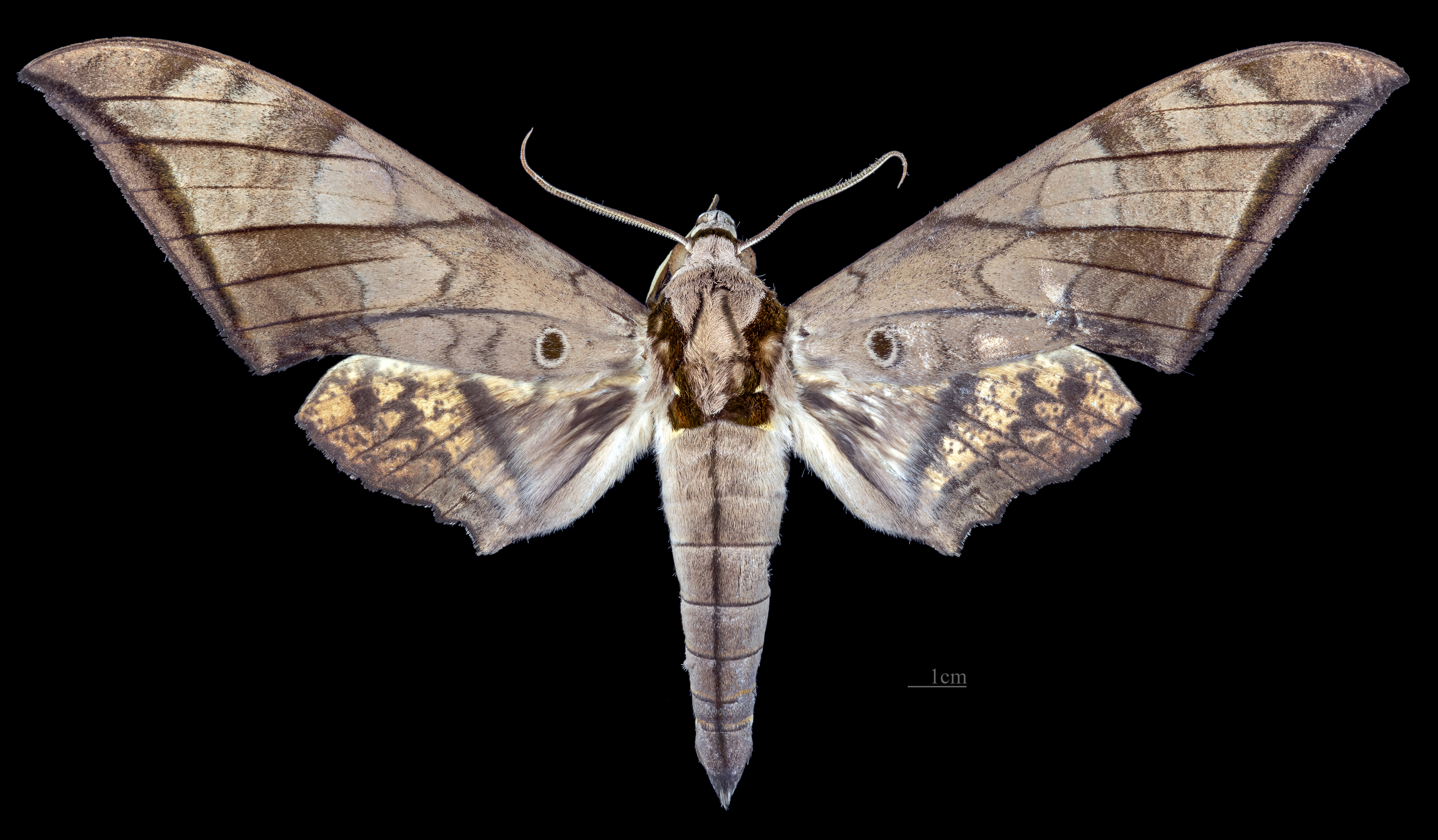
- Male dorsal
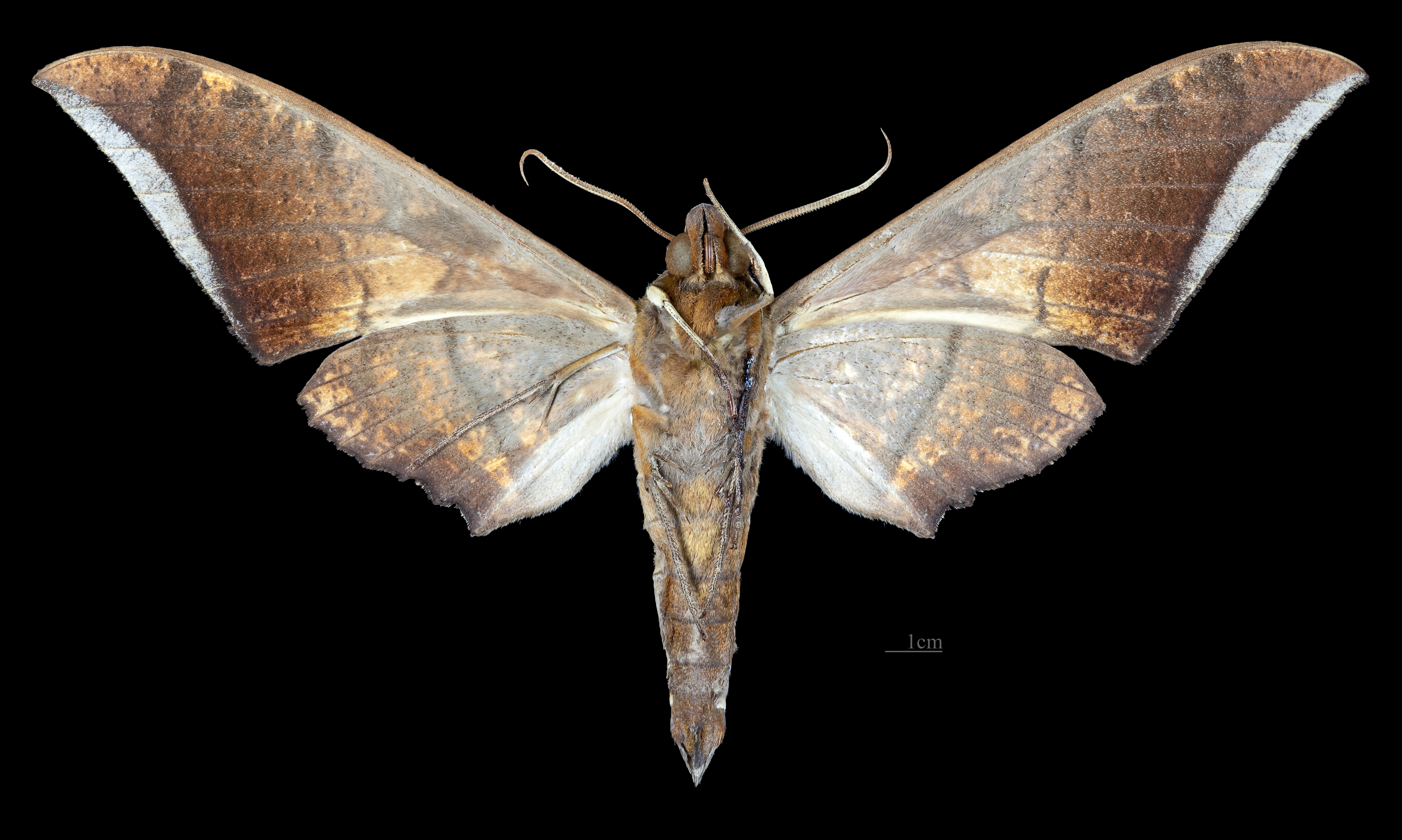
- Male ventral

Scientific classification
- Kingdom: Animalia
- Phylum: Arthropoda
- Class: Insecta
- Order: Lepidoptera
- Family: Sphingidae
- Genus: Ambulyx
- Species: A. phalaris

Binomial name
- Ambulyx phalaris (Jordan, 1919)

Synonyms
- Oxyambulyx phalaris Jordan, 1919

= Ambulyx phalaris =

Species of moth

Ambulyx phalaris is a species of moth of the family Sphingidae. It is known from Papua New Guinea.
