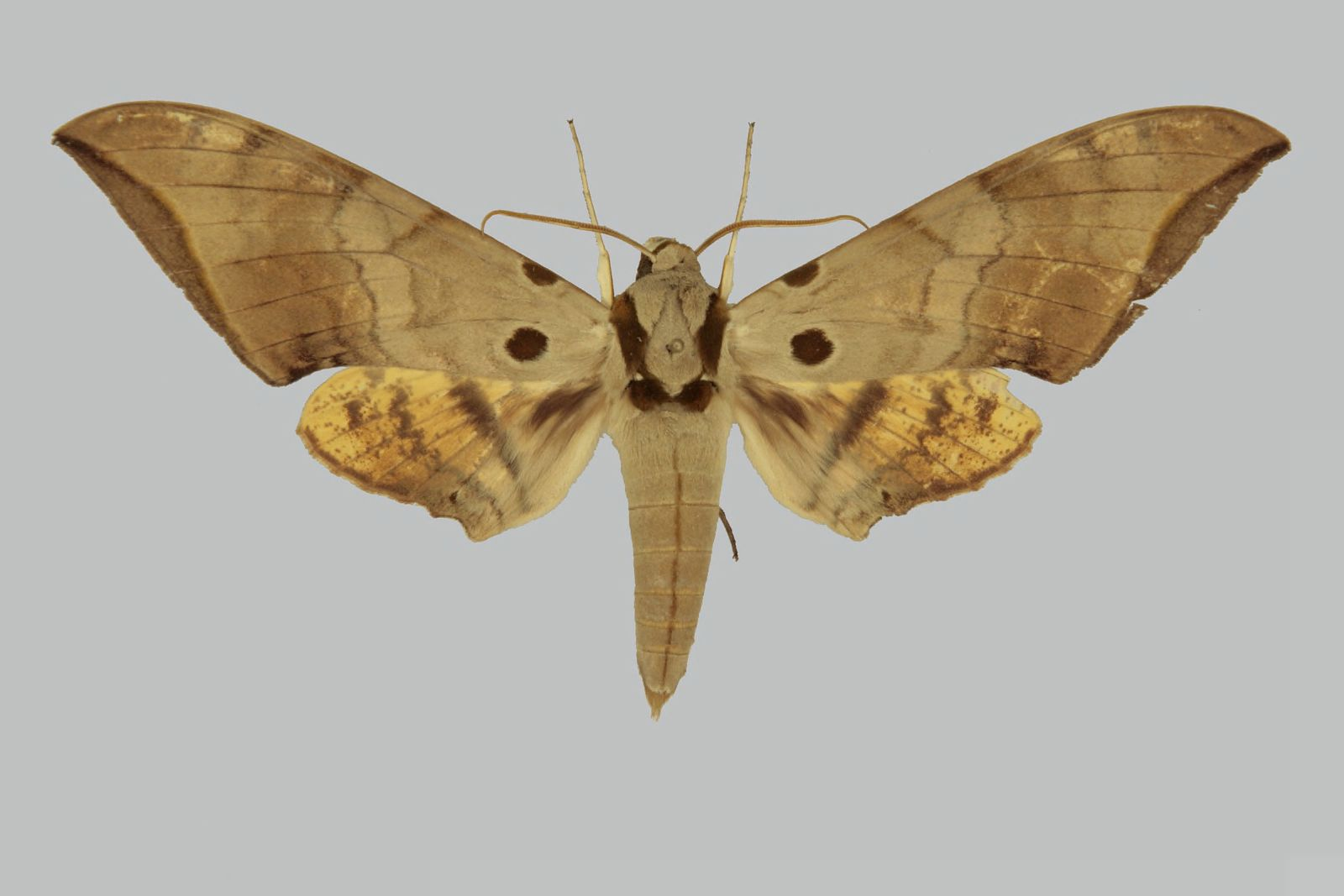
- Male

Scientific classification
- Kingdom: Animalia
- Phylum: Arthropoda
- Class: Insecta
- Order: Lepidoptera
- Family: Sphingidae
- Genus: Ambulyx
- Species: A. naessigi

Binomial name
- Ambulyx naessigi Brechlin, 1998

= Ambulyx naessigi =

Species of moth

Ambulyx naessigi is a species of moth of the family Sphingidae. It is known from the Moluccas.
