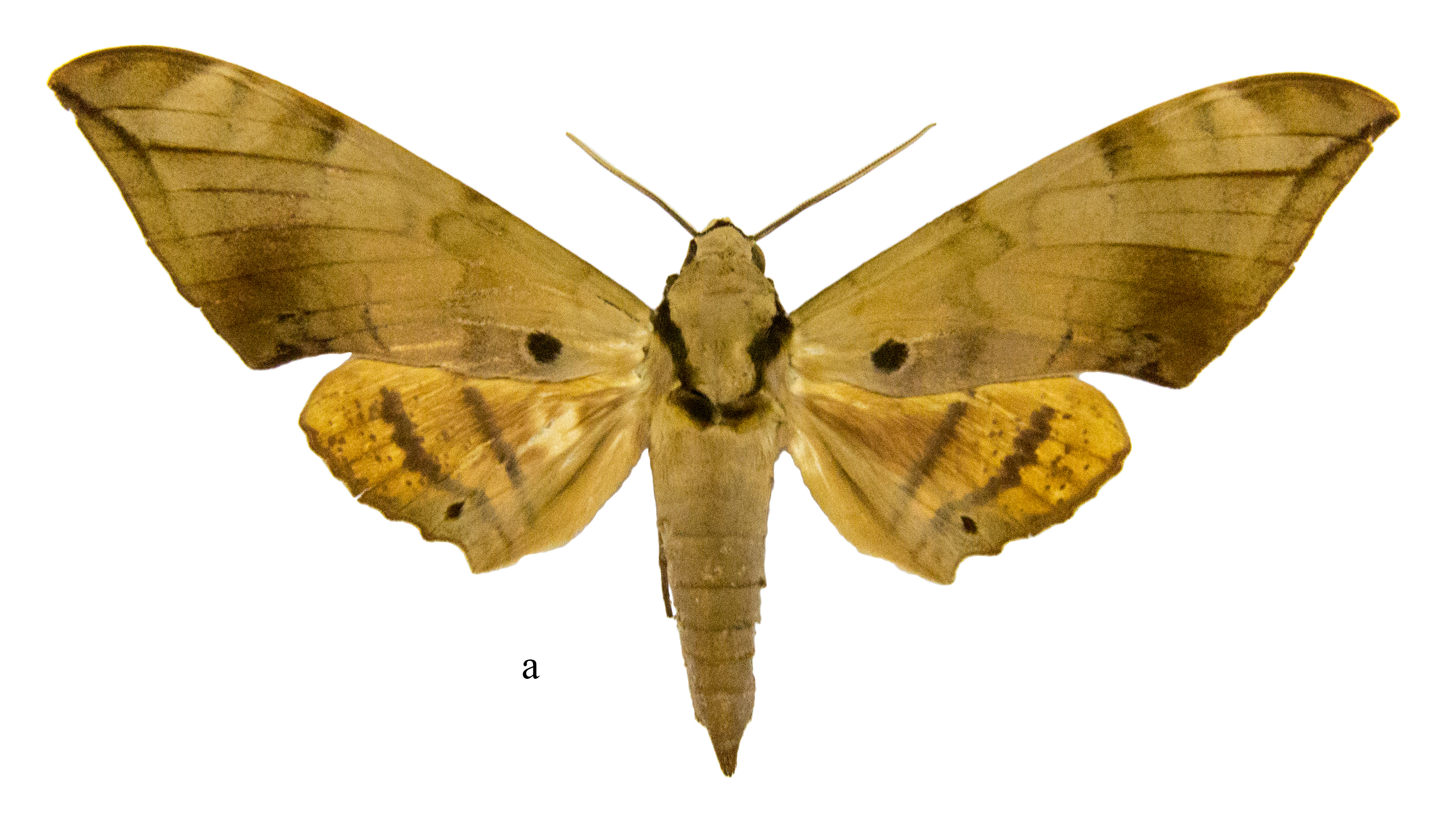

Scientific classification
- Kingdom: Animalia
- Phylum: Arthropoda
- Class: Insecta
- Order: Lepidoptera
- Family: Sphingidae
- Genus: Ambulyx
- Species: A. rawlinsi

Binomial name
- Ambulyx rawlinsi Melichar, Rezac & Rindos, 2015

= Ambulyx rawlinsi =

Species of moth

Ambulyx rawlinsi is a species of moth in the family Sphingidae. It was described by Melichar, Rezac and Rindos in 2015. It is known from Indonesia.
