= Ambulyx flavocelebensis =

Scientific classification
- Kingdom: Animalia
- Phylum: Arthropoda
- Class: Insecta
- Order: Lepidoptera
- Family: Sphingidae
- Genus: Ambulyx
- Species: A. flavocelebensis

Binomial name
- Ambulyx flavocelebensis (Brechlin, 2009)

Synonyms
- Ambulyx canescens flavocelebensis Brechlin, 2009

Species of moth

Ambulyx flavocelebensis is a species of moth of the family Sphingidae. It is known from Sulawesi.
