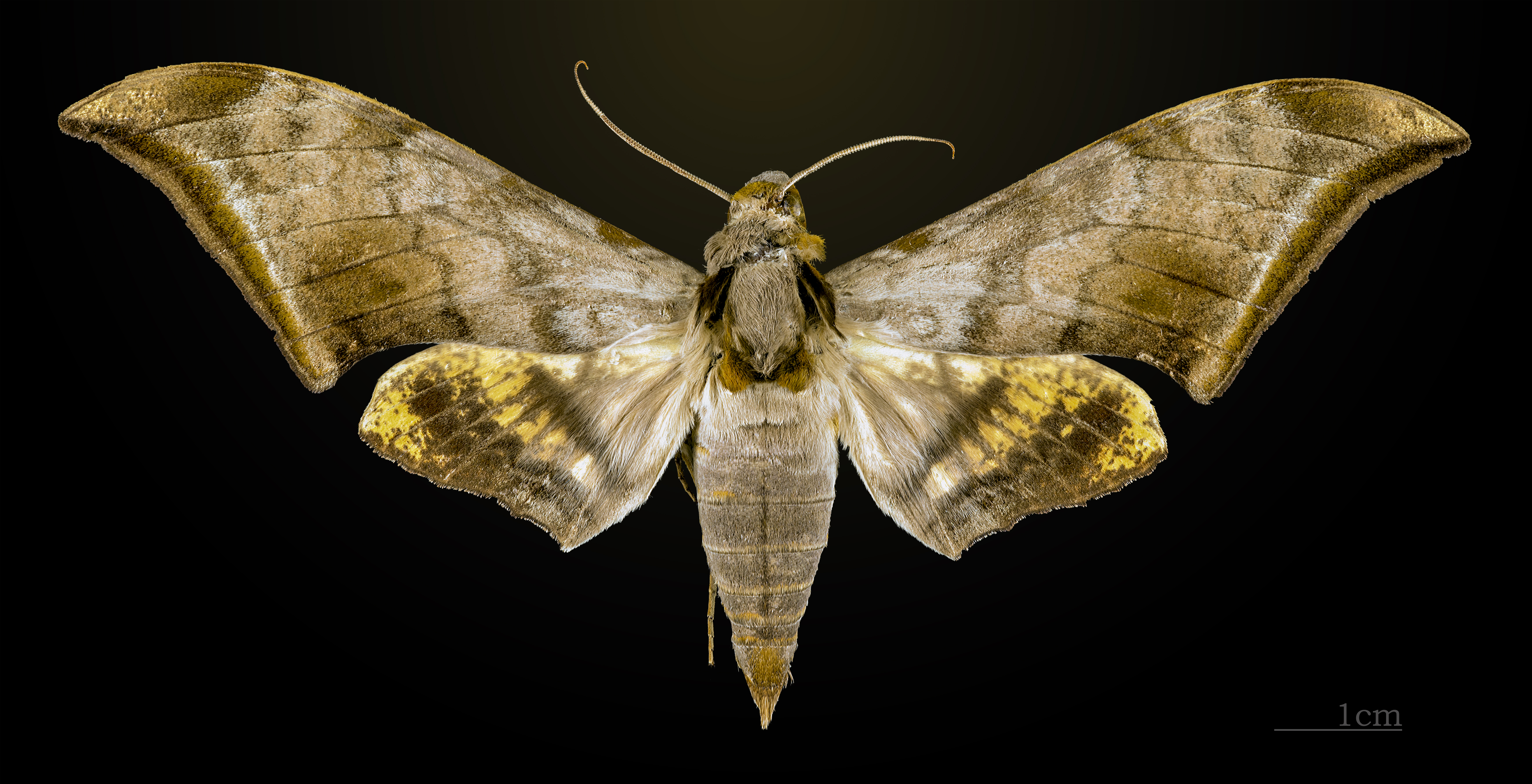
- Ambulyx jordani

Scientific classification
- Domain: Eukaryota
- Kingdom: Animalia
- Phylum: Arthropoda
- Class: Insecta
- Order: Lepidoptera
- Family: Sphingidae
- Tribe: Ambulycini
- Genus: Ambulyx; Westwood, 1847

Species
- See text

Synonyms
- Oxyambulyx Rothschild & Jordan, 1903

= Ambulyx =

Genus of moths

Ambulyx is a genus of moths in the family Sphingidae, described by Westwood in 1847.

== Species ==
- Ambulyx adhemariusa Eitschberger, Bergmann & Hauenstein, 2006
- Ambulyx amara Kobayashi, Wang & Yano, 2006
- Ambulyx amboynensis Rothschild, 1894
- Ambulyx andangi Brechlin 1998
- Ambulyx auripennis Moore 1879
- Ambulyx bakeri (Clark 1929)
- Ambulyx belli (Jordan 1923)
- Ambulyx bhutana Brechlin, 2014
- Ambulyx bima Rothschild & Jordan 1903
- Ambulyx canescens Walker 1865
- Ambulyx carycina (Jordan, 1919)
- Ambulyx celebensis (Jordan 1919)
- Ambulyx ceramensis (Joicey & Talbot 1921)
- Ambulyx charlesi (Clark 1924)
- Ambulyx clavata (Jordan 1929)
- Ambulyx cyclasticta (Joicey & Kaye 1917)
- Ambulyx dohertyi Rothschild 1894
- Ambulyx flava (Clark, 1924)
- Ambulyx flavocelebensis (Brechlin, 2009)
- Ambulyx immaculata (Clark 1924)
- Ambulyx interplacida Brechlin, 2006
- Ambulyx inouei Cadiou & Holloway 1985
- Ambulyx japonica Rothschild 1894
- Ambulyx johnsoni (Clark 1917)
- Ambulyx jordani (Bethune-Baker 1910)
- Ambulyx kuangtungensis (Mell 1922)
- Ambulyx lahora Butler 1875
- Ambulyx latifascia Brechlin & Haxaire, 2014
- Ambulyx lestradei Cadiou 1998
- Ambulyx liturata Butler 1875
- Ambulyx maculifera Walker 1866
- Ambulyx marissa Eitschberger & Melichar, 2009
- Ambulyx matti (Jordan 1923)
- Ambulyx meeki (Rothschild & Jordan 1903)
- Ambulyx montana Cadiou & Kitching 1990
- Ambulyx moorei Moore 1858
- Ambulyx naessigi Brechlin 1998
- Ambulyx obliterata (Rothschild 1920)
- Ambulyx ochracea Butler 1885
- Ambulyx phalaris (Jordan 1919)
- Ambulyx placida Moore 1888
- Ambulyx pryeri Distant 1887
- Ambulyx pseudoclavata Inoue 1996
- Ambulyx pseudoregia Eitschberger & Bergmann, 2006
- Ambulyx rawlinsi Melichar, Řezáč & Rindoš, 2015
- Ambulyx regia Eitschberger, 2006
- Ambulyx rudloffi Brechlin, 2005
- Ambulyx schauffelbergeri Bremer & Grey 1853
- Ambulyx semifervens (Walker 1865)
- Ambulyx semiplacida Inoue 1990
- Ambulyx sericeipennis Butler 1875
- Ambulyx siamensis Inoue 1991
- Ambulyx sinjaevi Brechlin 1998
- Ambulyx staudingeri Rothschild 1894
- Ambulyx substrigilis Westwood 1847
- Ambulyx suluensis Hogenes & Treadaway 1998
- Ambulyx tattina (Jordan 1919)
- Ambulyx tenimberi (Clark 1929)
- Ambulyx tobii (Inoue, 1976)
- Ambulyx tondanoi (Clark 1930)
- Ambulyx viteki Melichar & Řezáč, 2013
- Ambulyx wildei Miskin 1891
- Ambulyx wilemani (Rothschild & Jordan 1916)
- Ambulyx zacharovi Ivshin, 2014
- Ambulyx zhejiangensis Brechlin, 2009
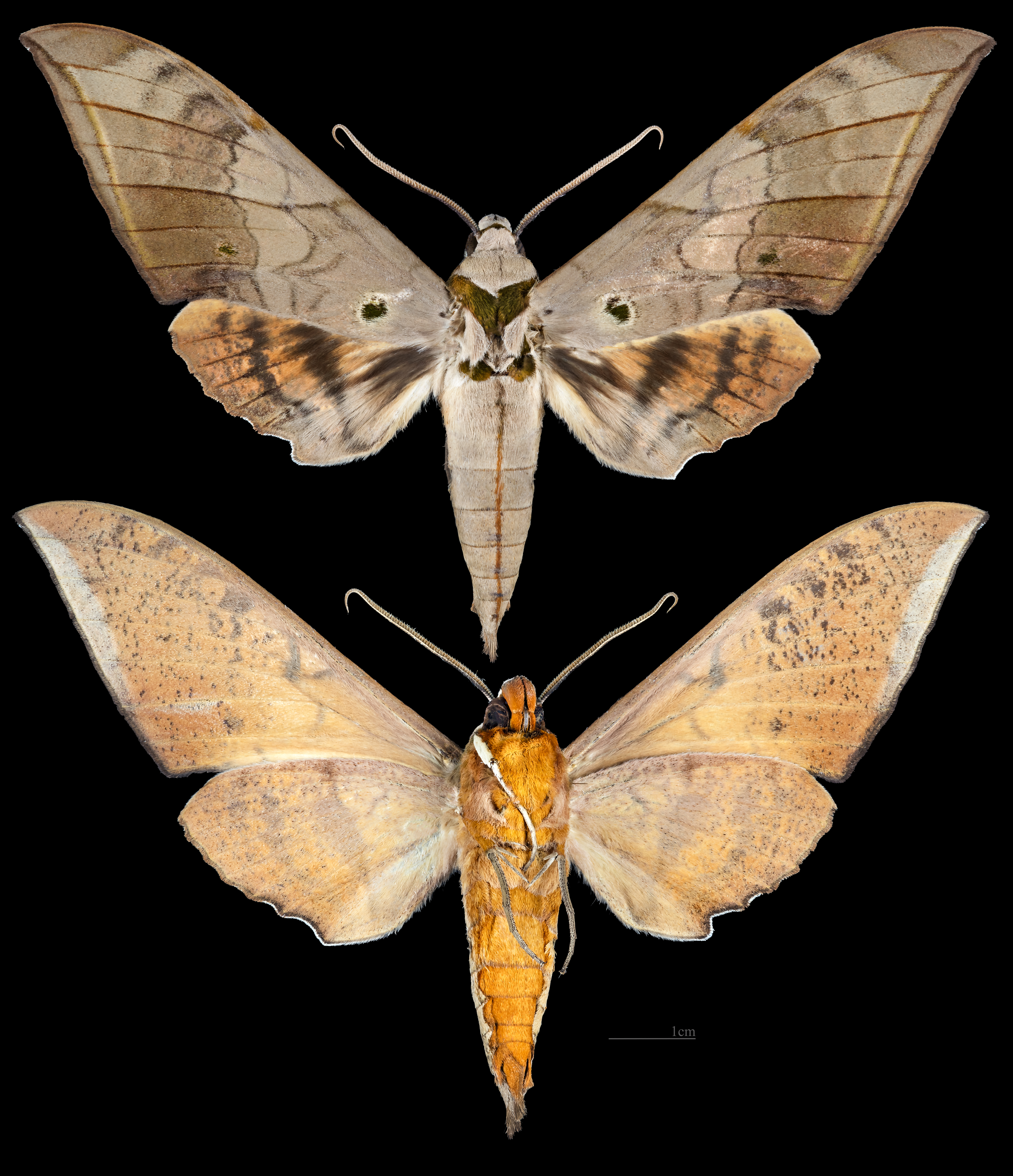
Ambulyx auripennis

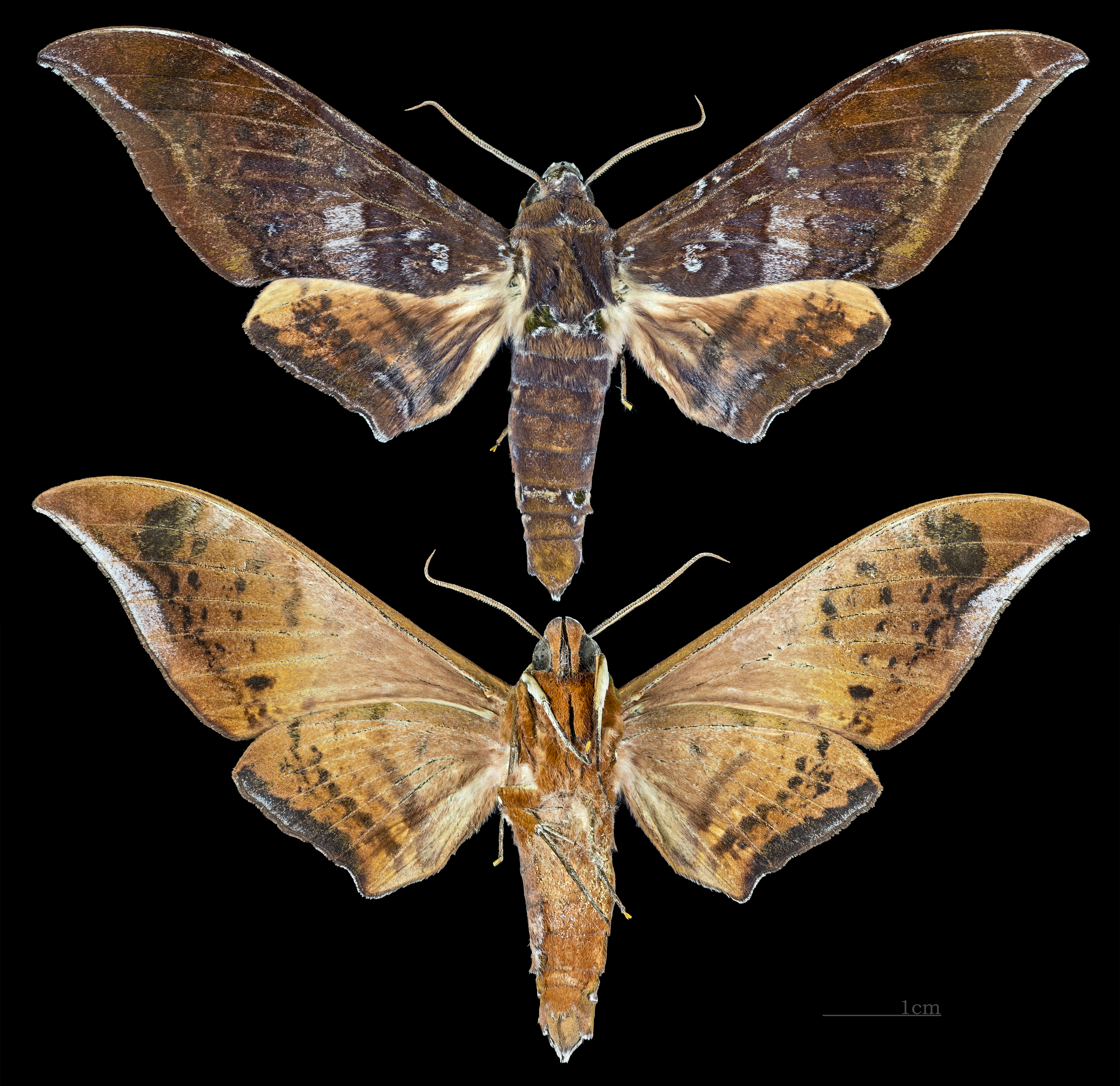
Ambulyx bakeri

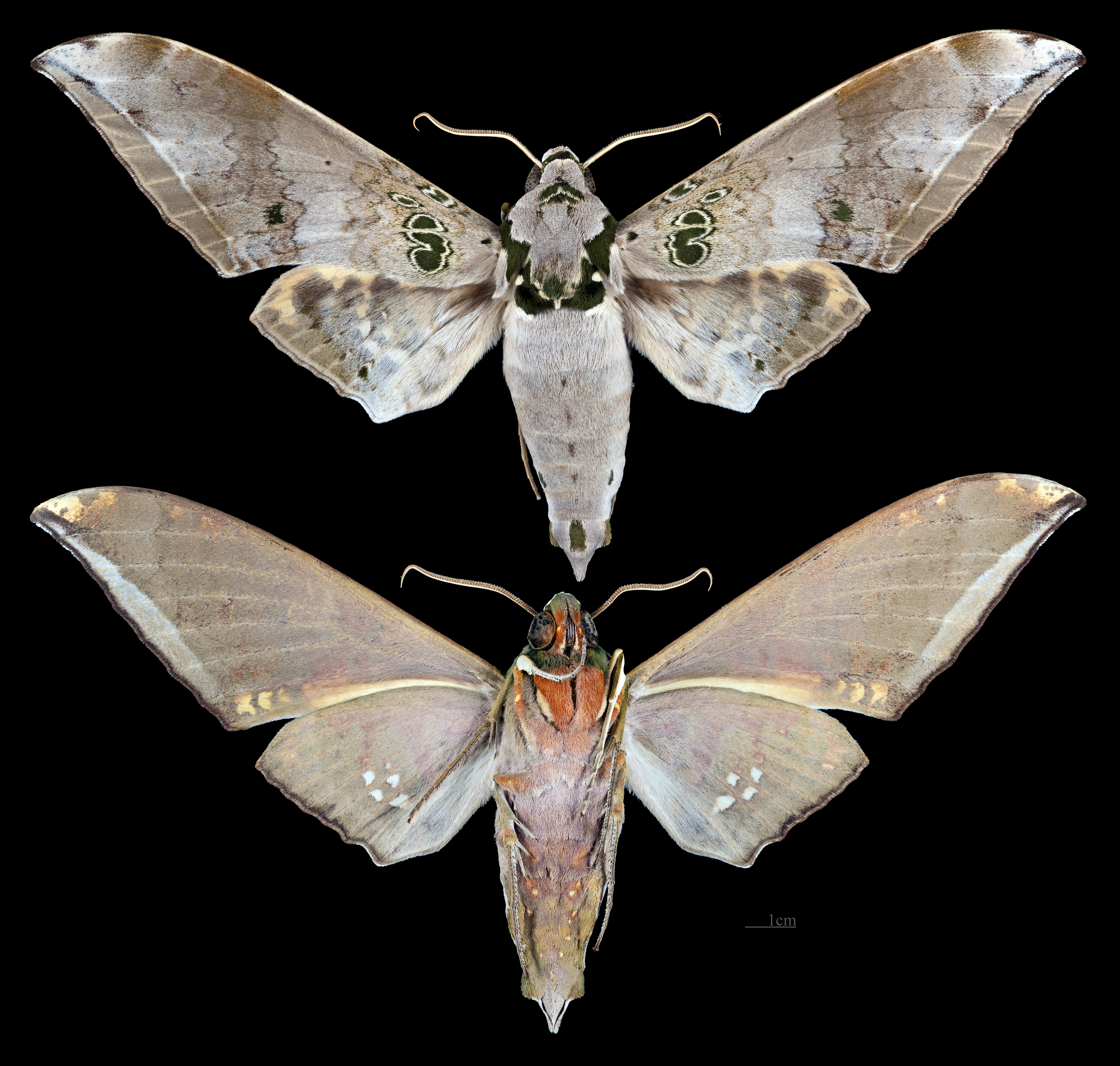
Ambulyx canescens

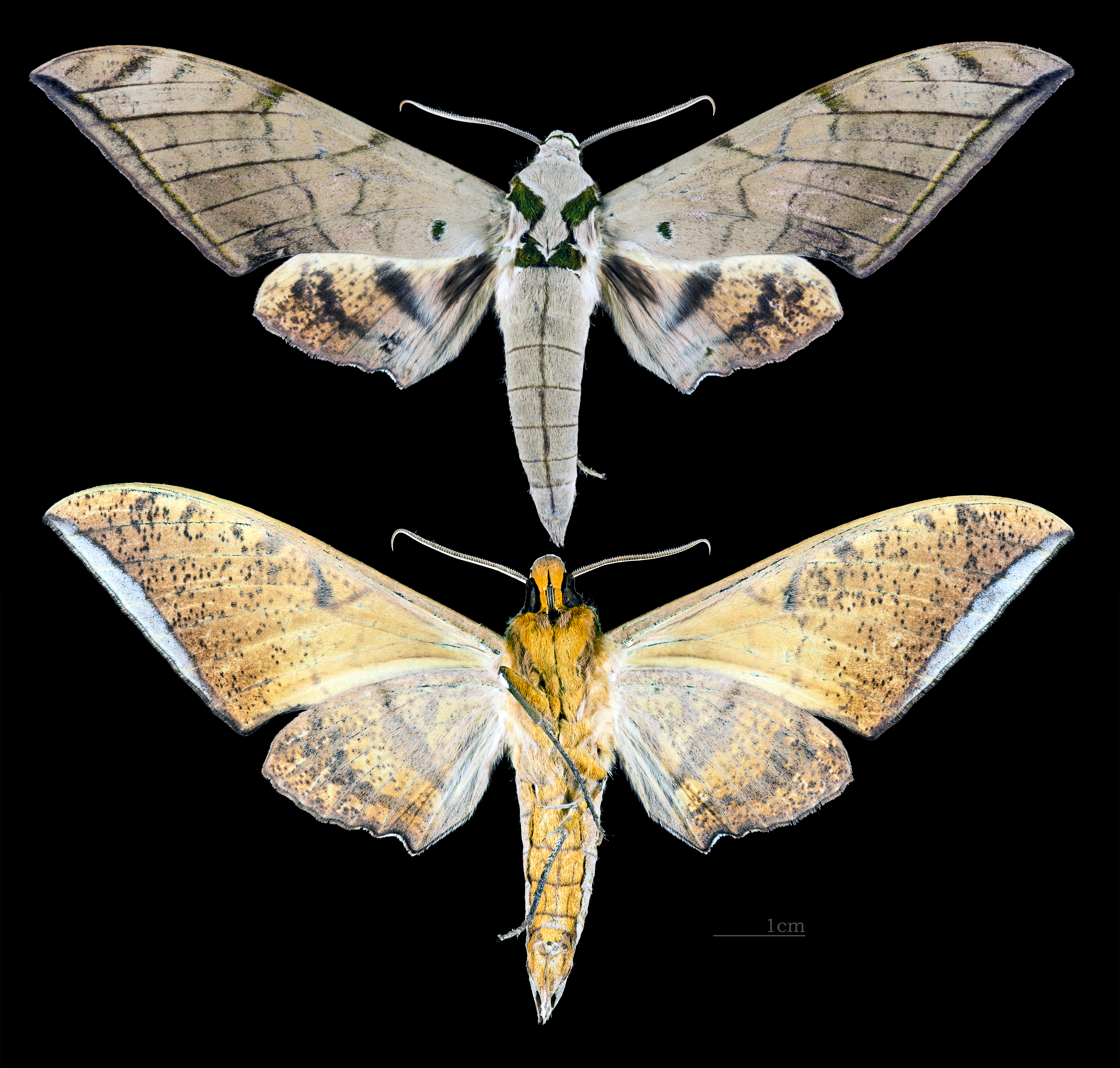
Ambulyx clavata

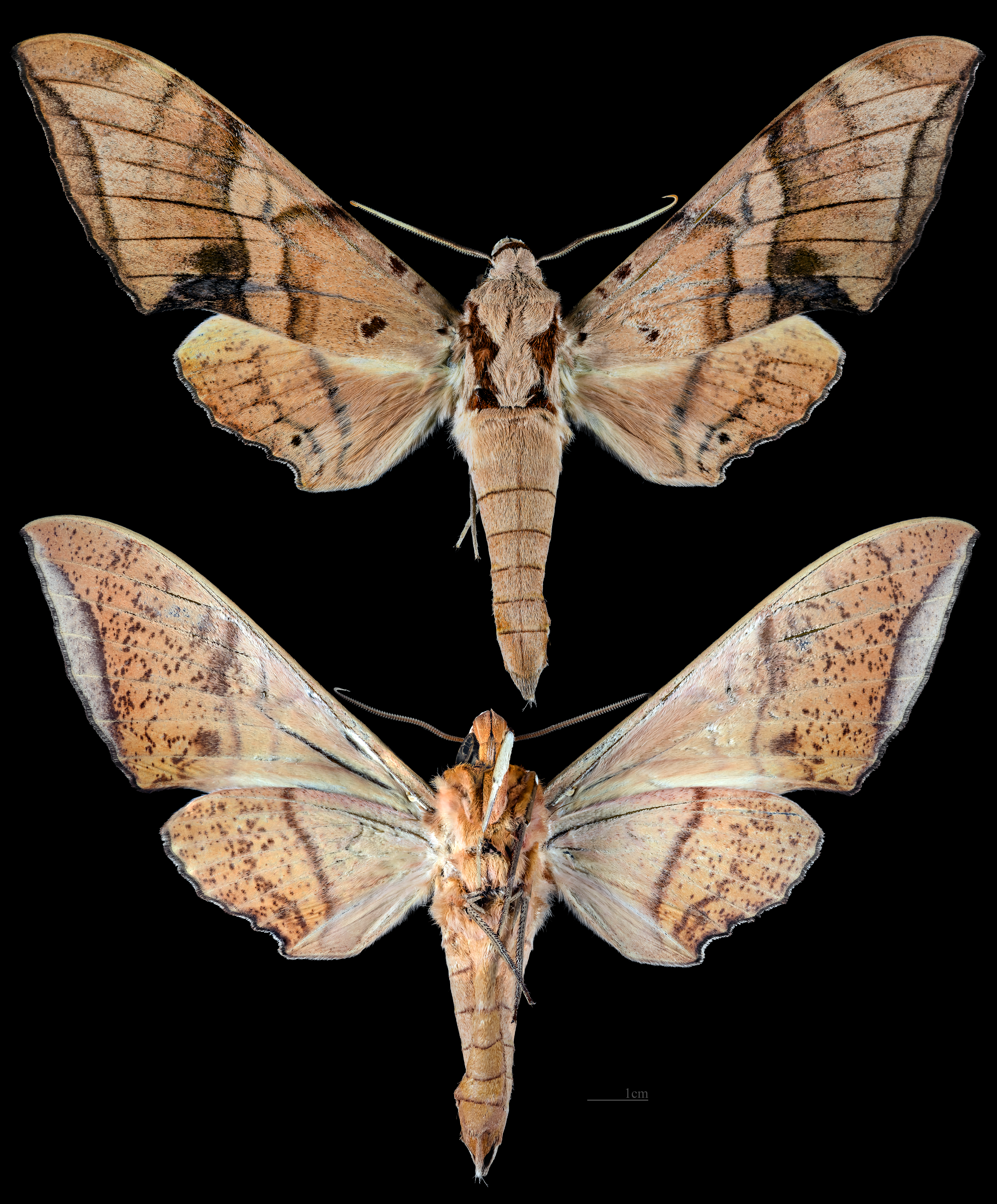
Ambulyx cyclasticta

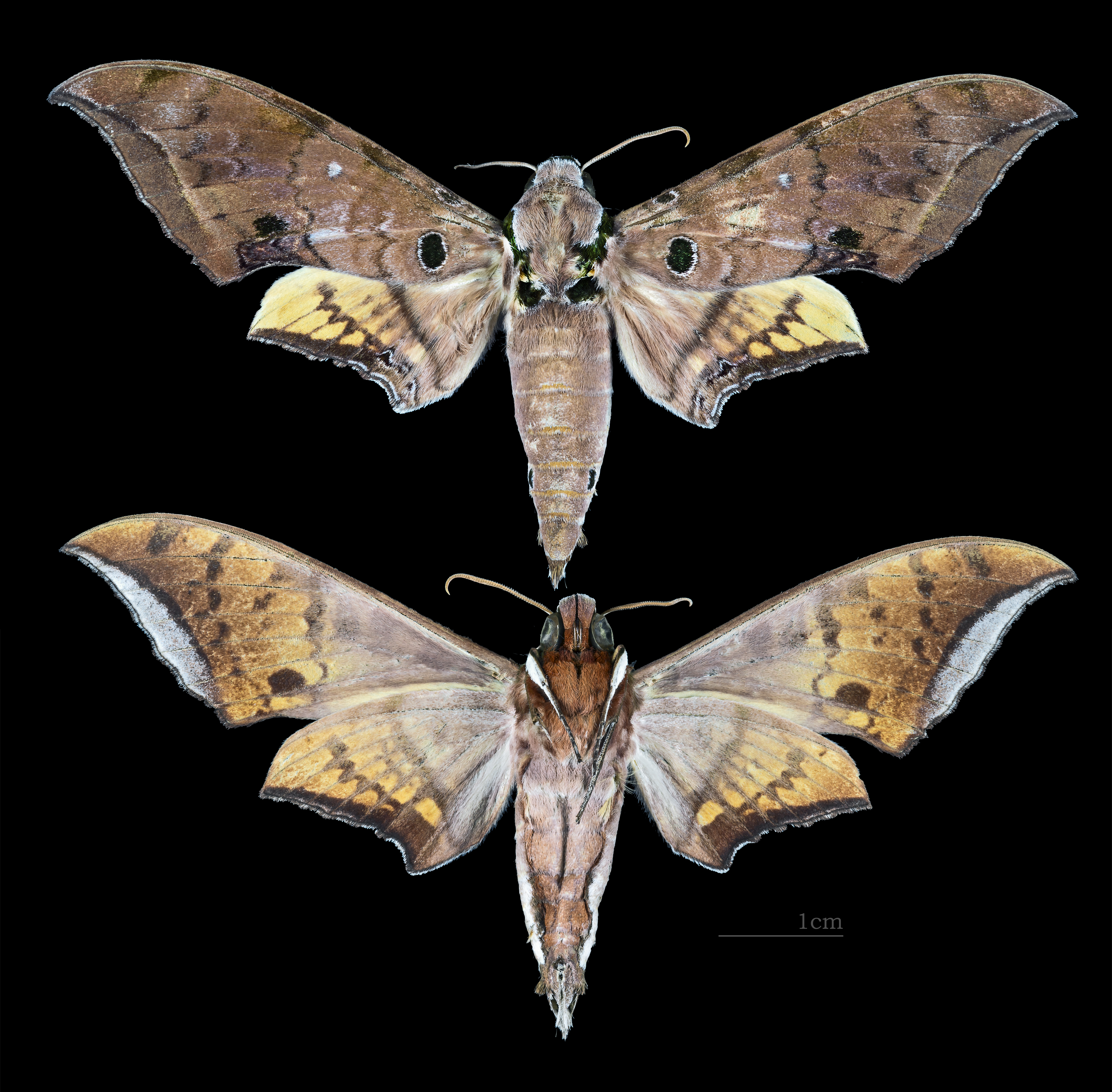
Ambulyx dohertyi

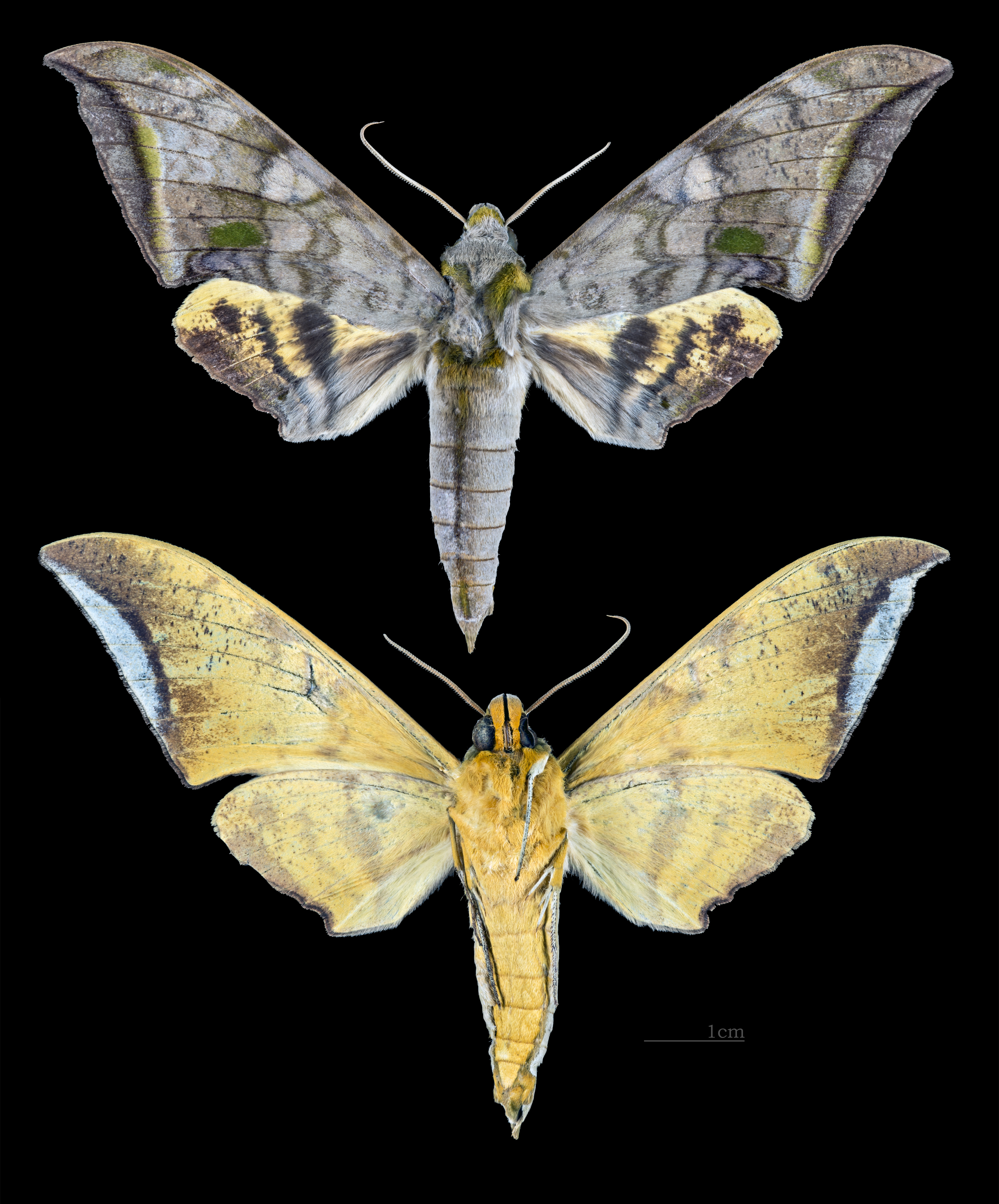
Ambulyx immaculata

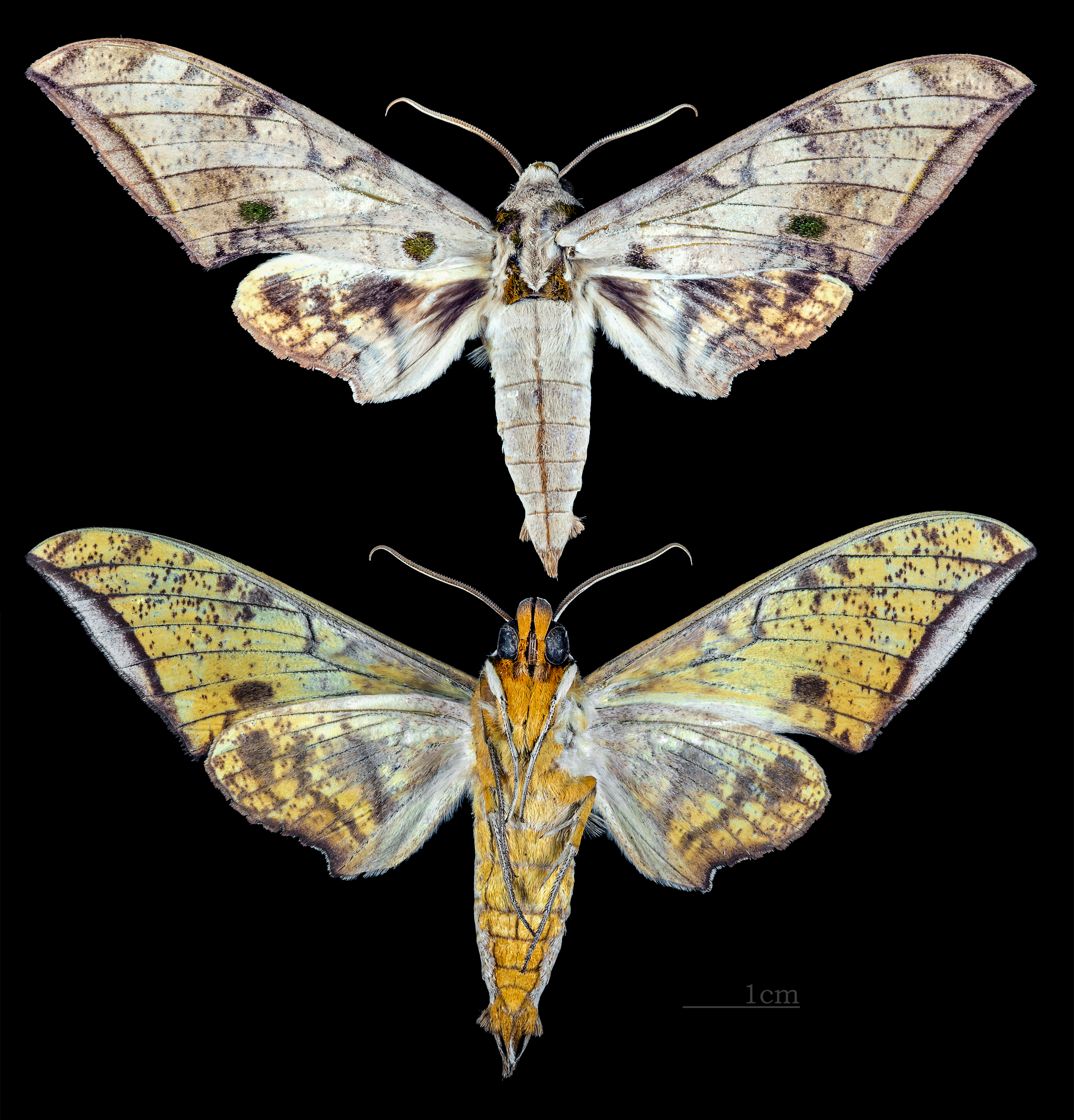
Ambulyx inouei

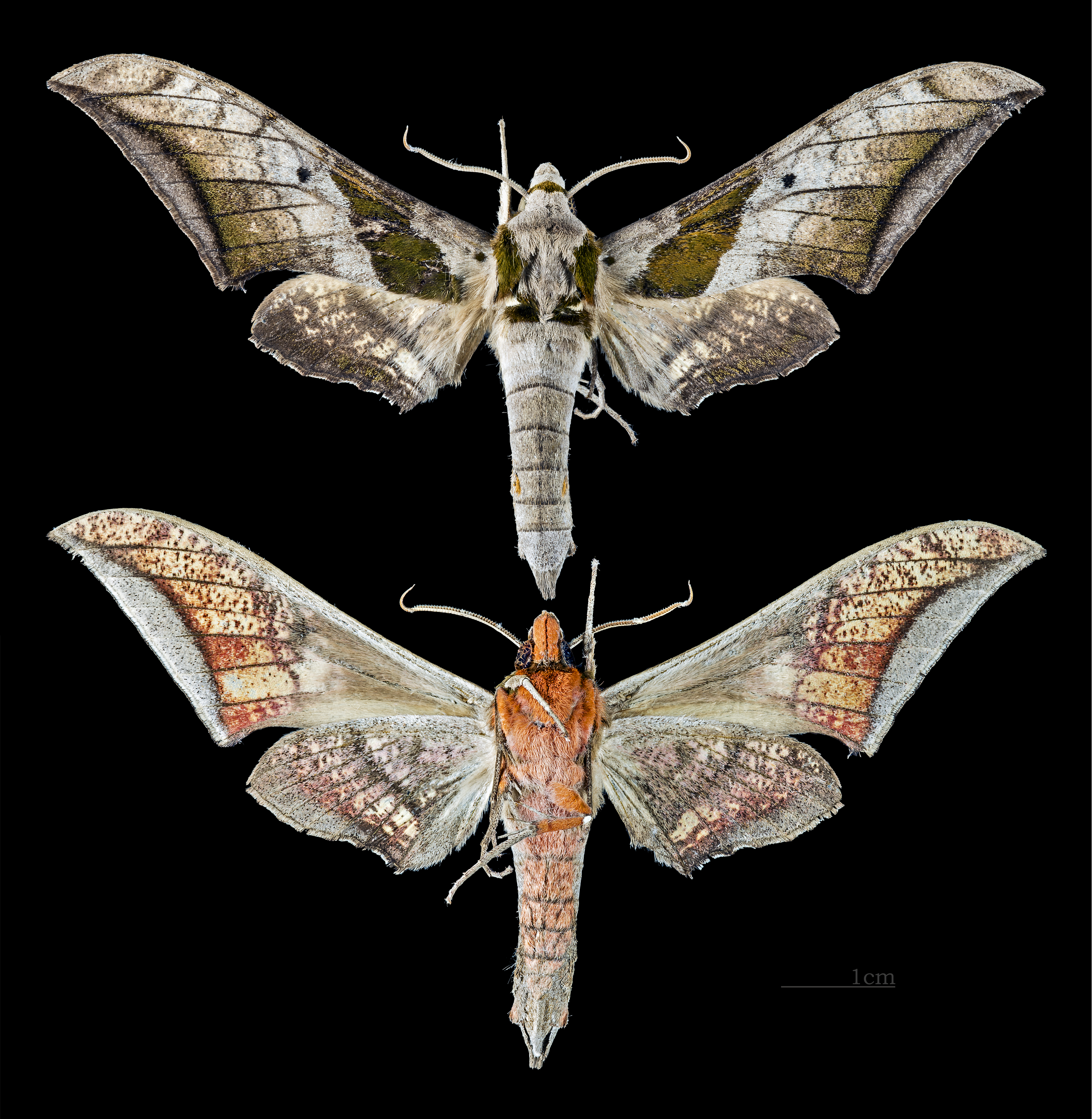
Ambulyx japonica

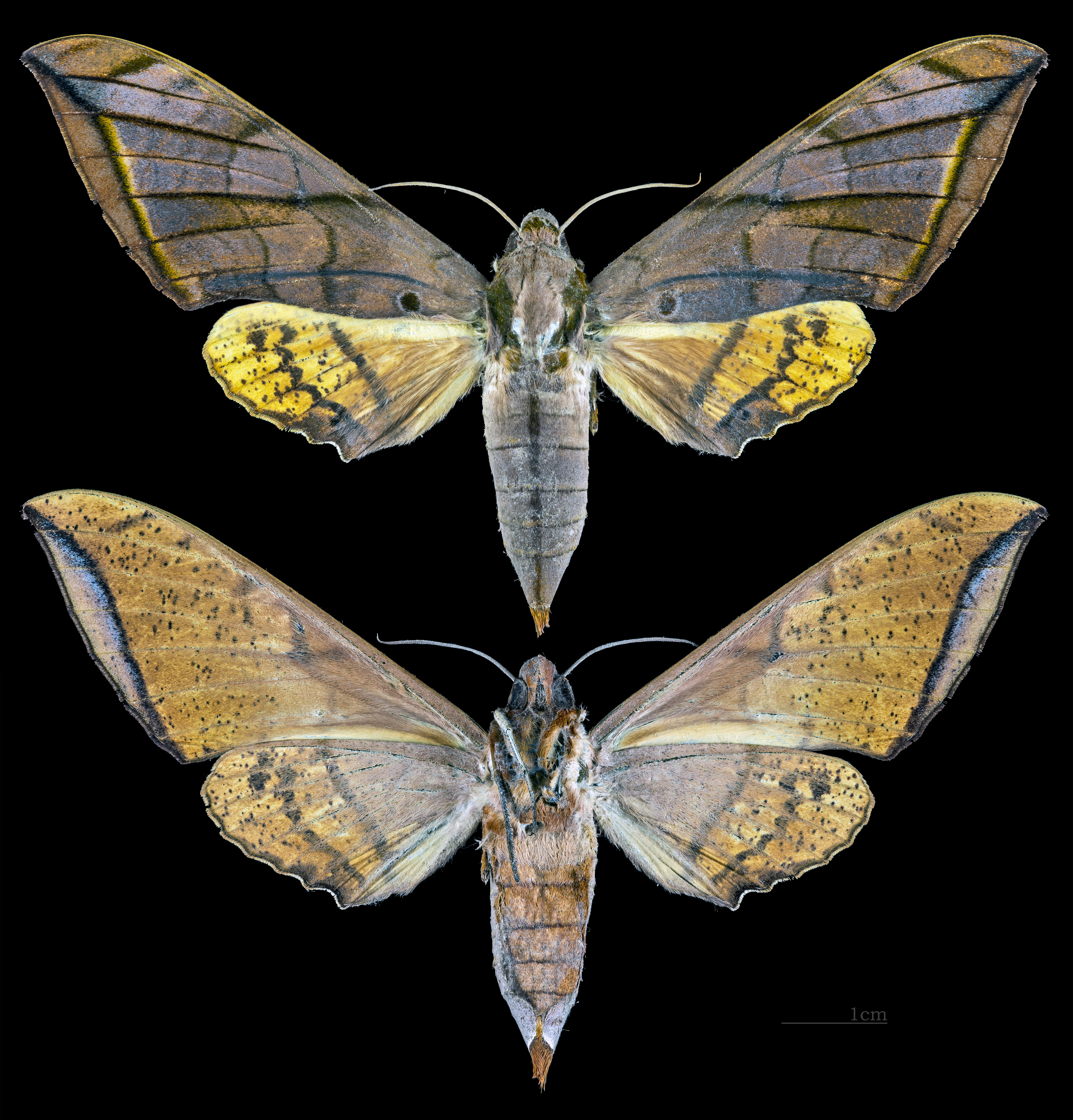
Ambulyx johnsoni

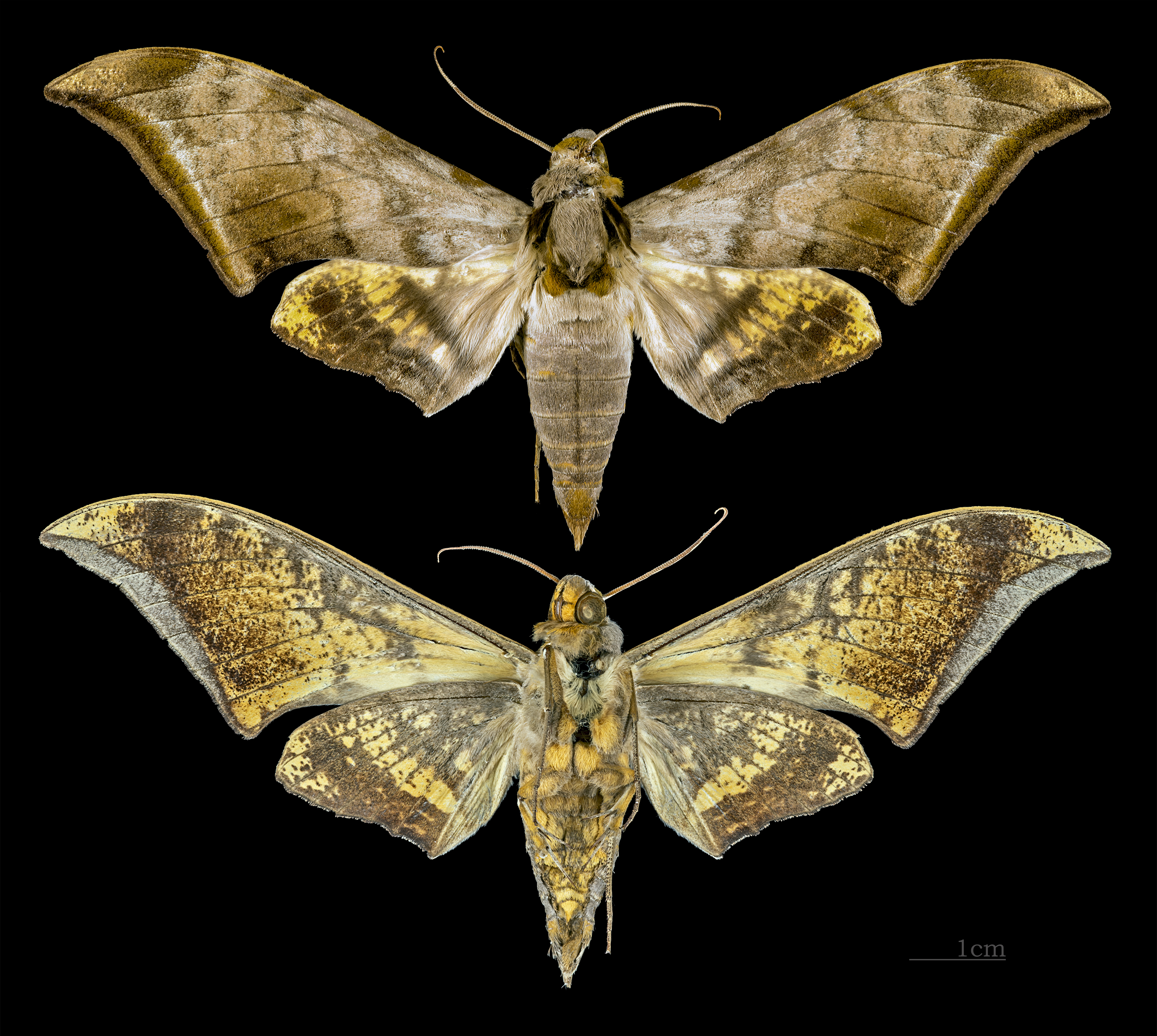
Ambulyx jordani

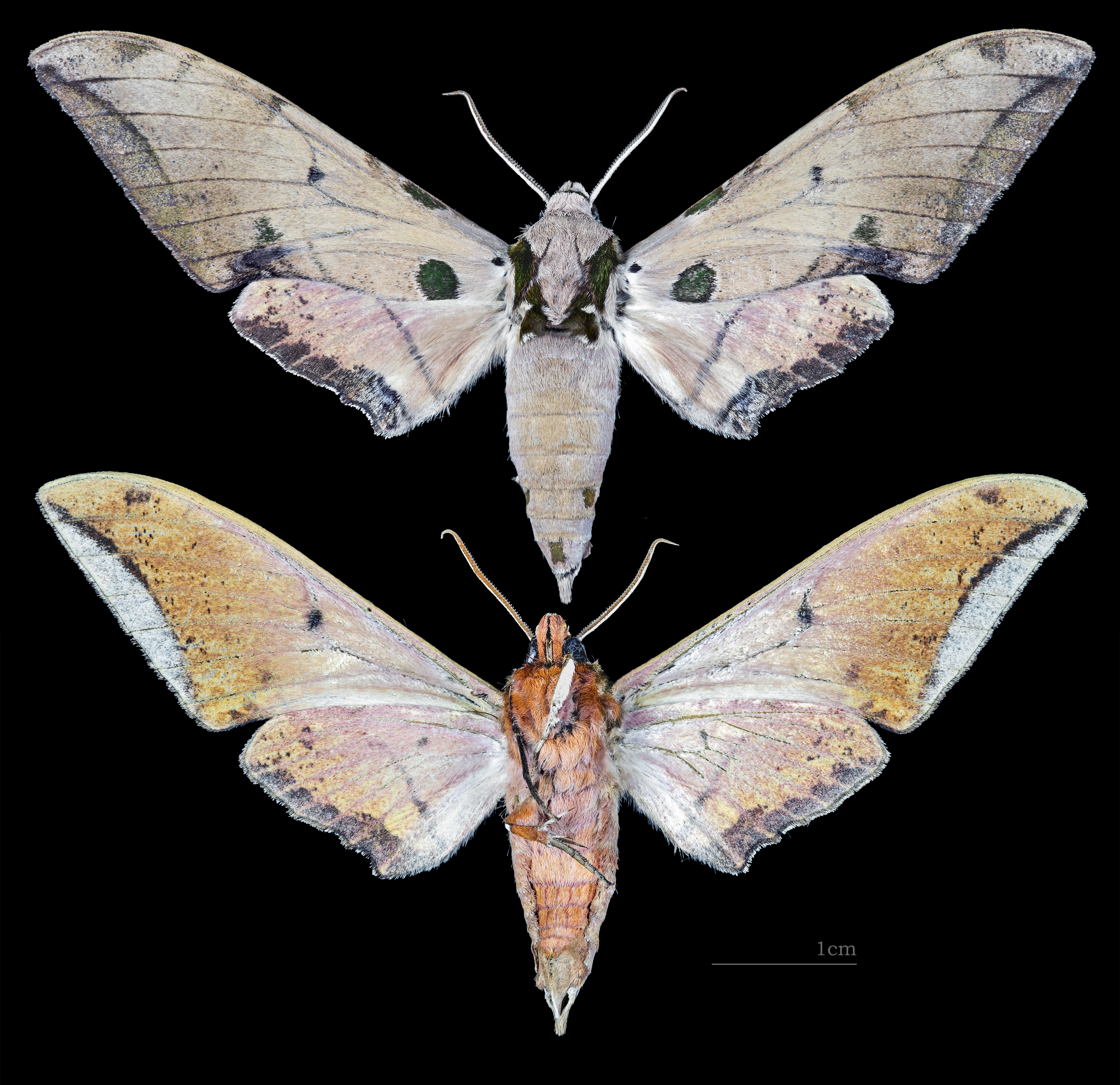
Ambulyx kuangtungensis

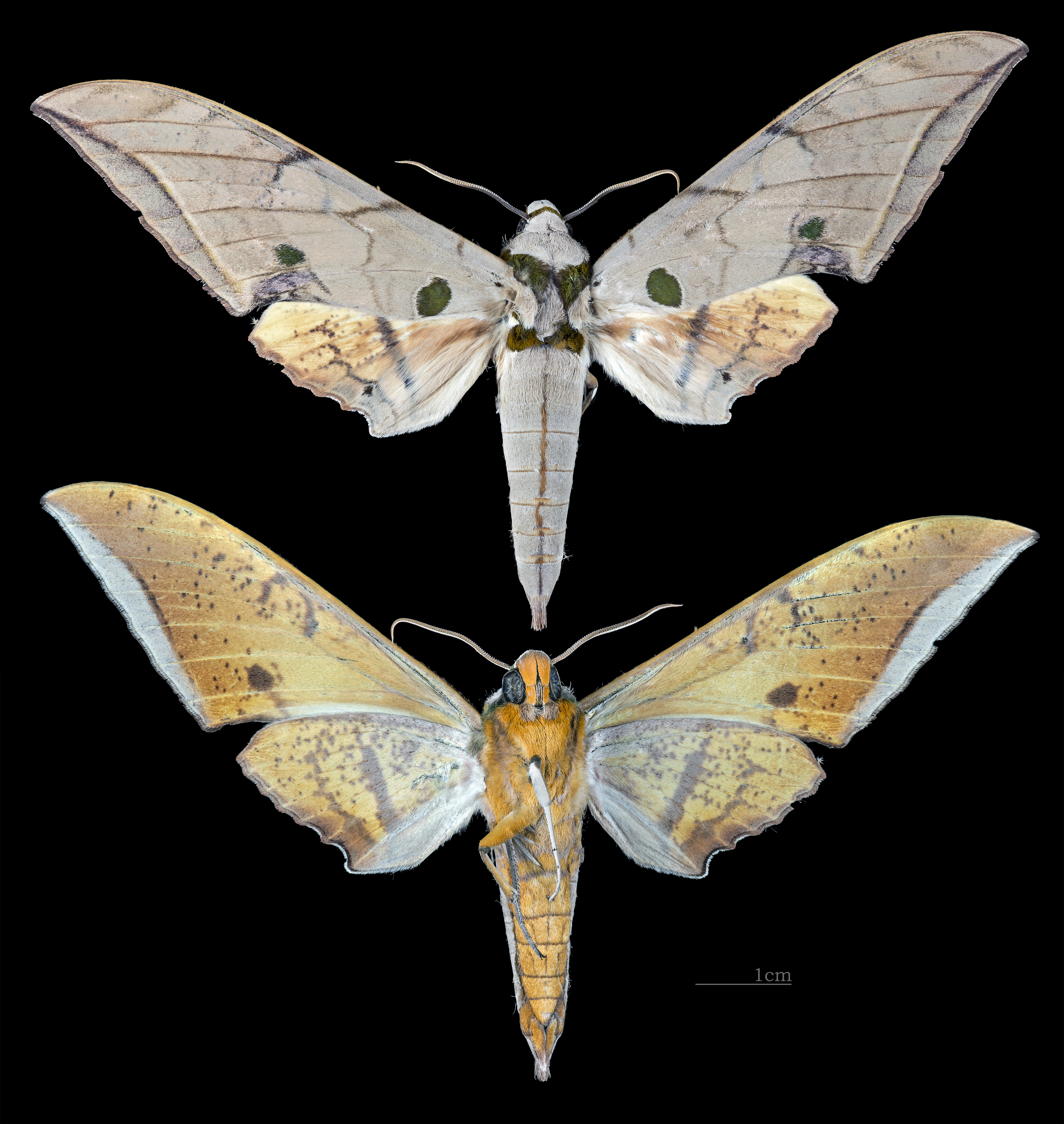
Ambulyx liturata

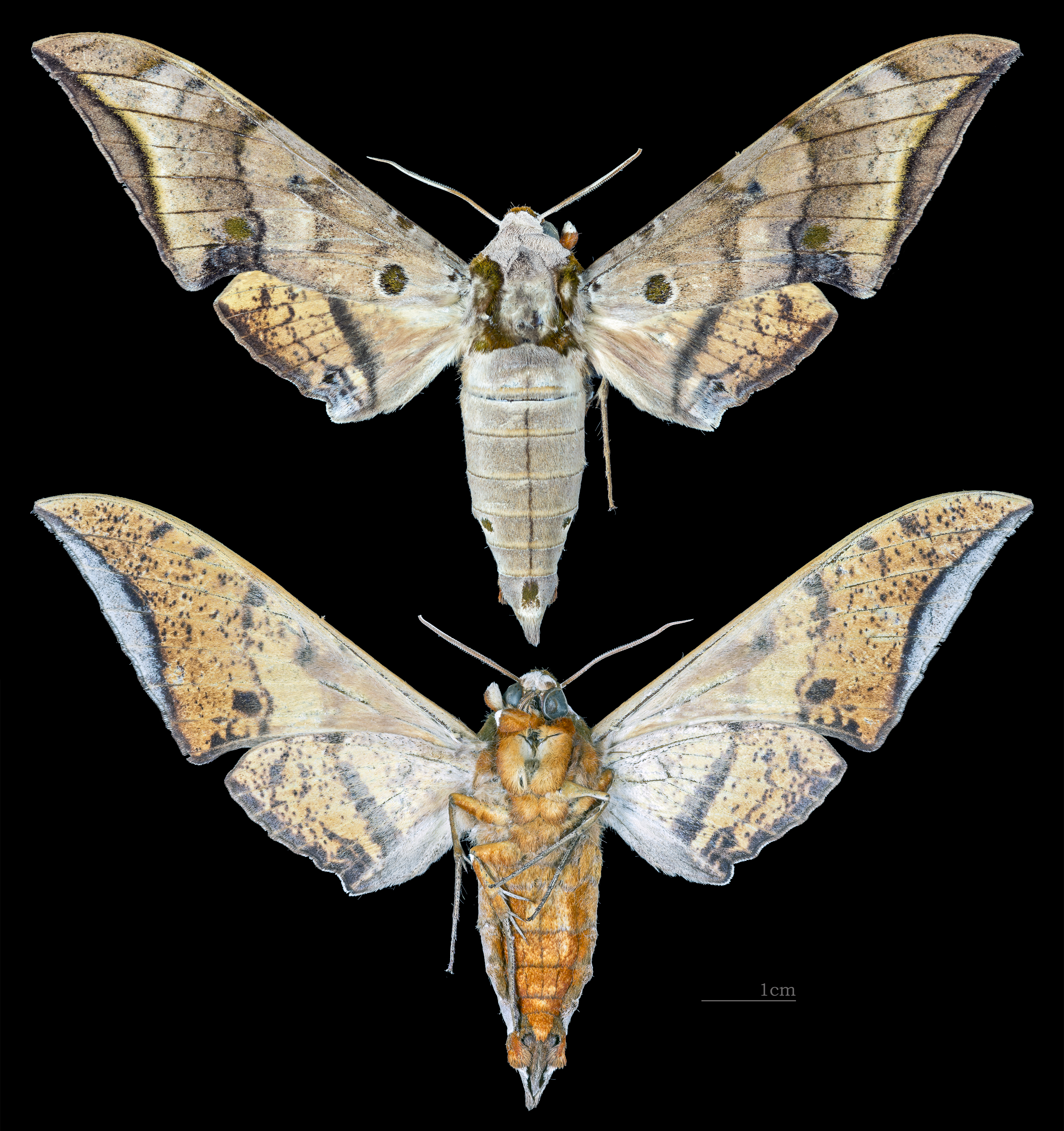
Ambulyx maculifera

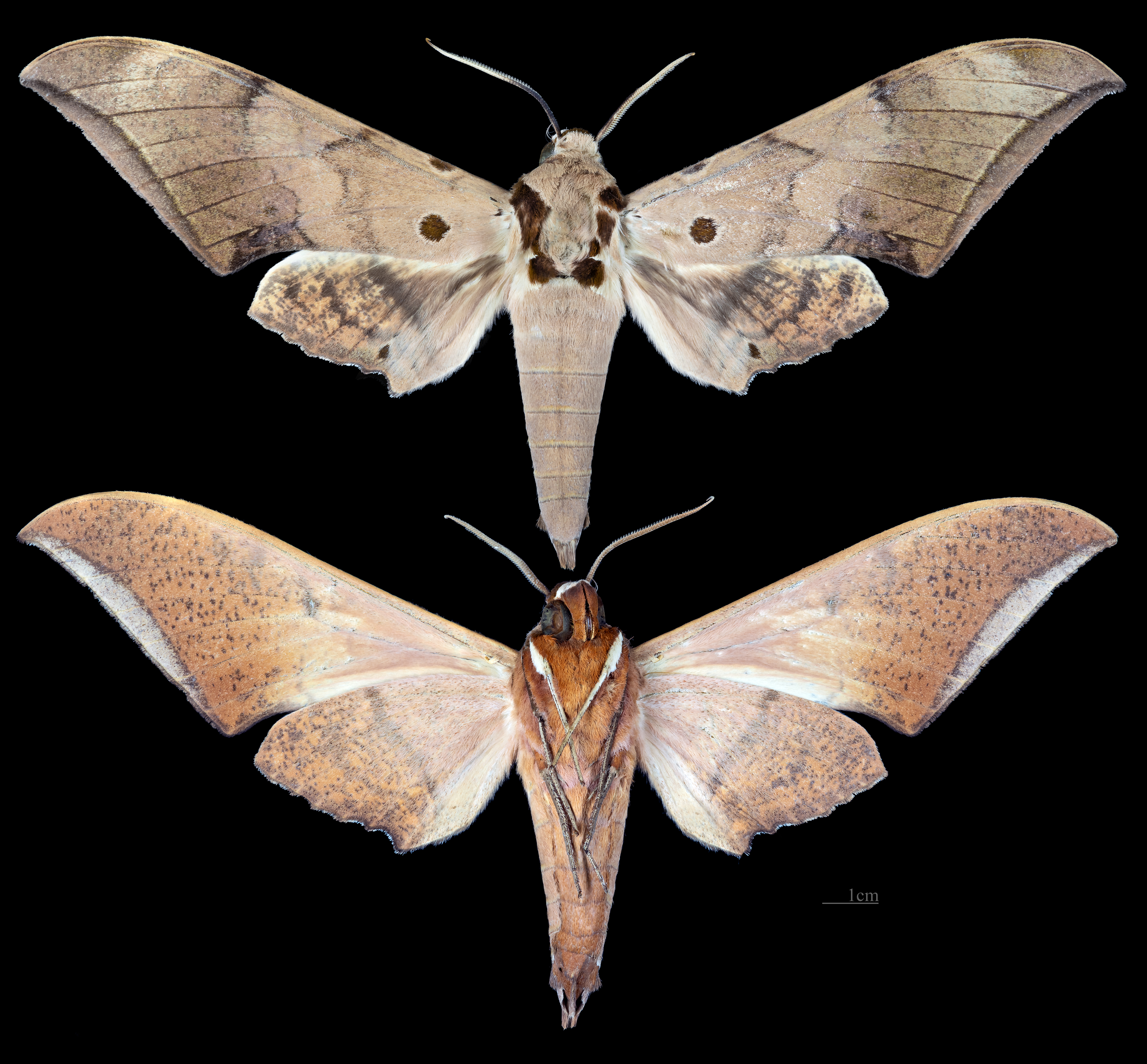
Ambulyx matti

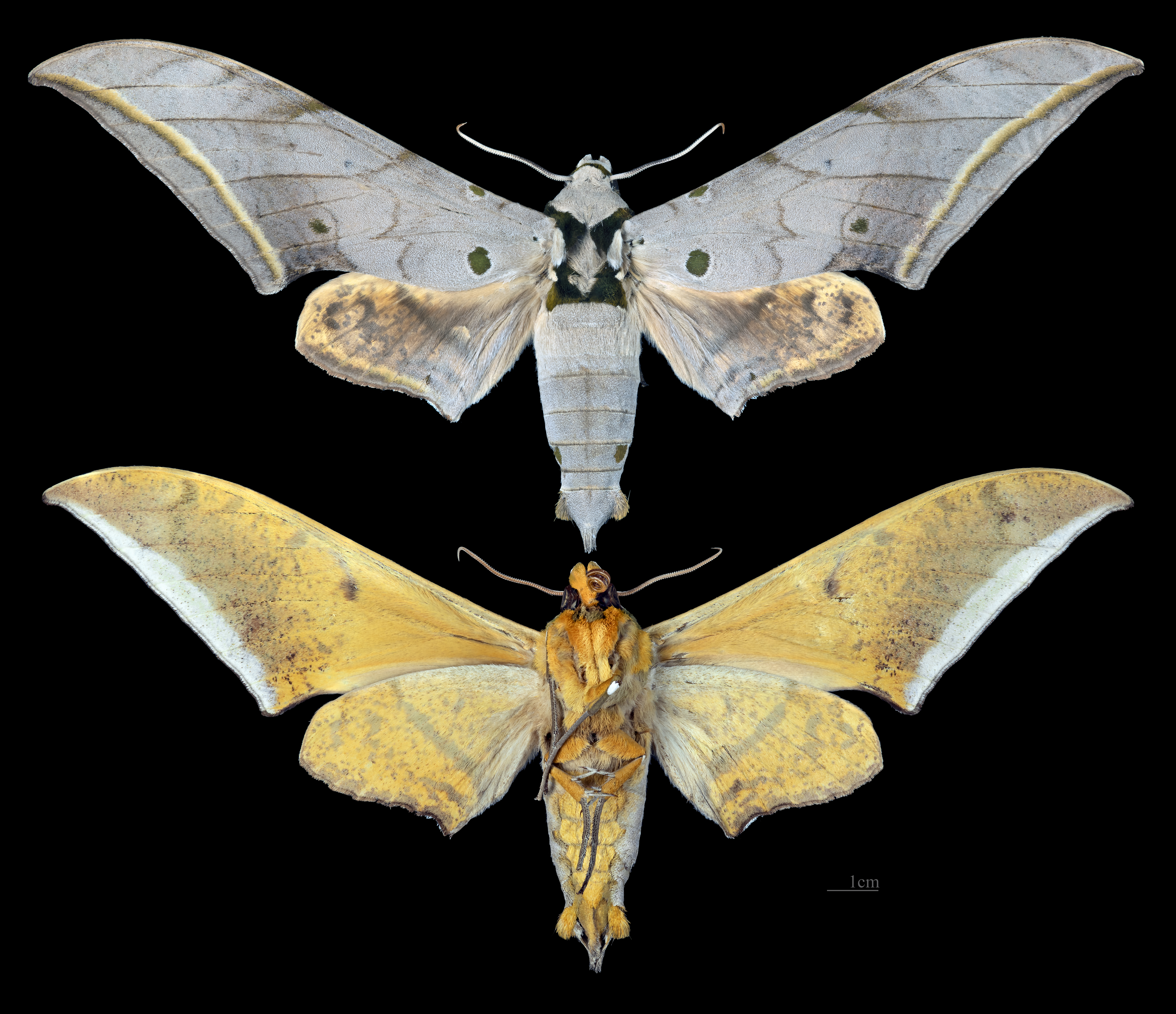
Ambulyx montana

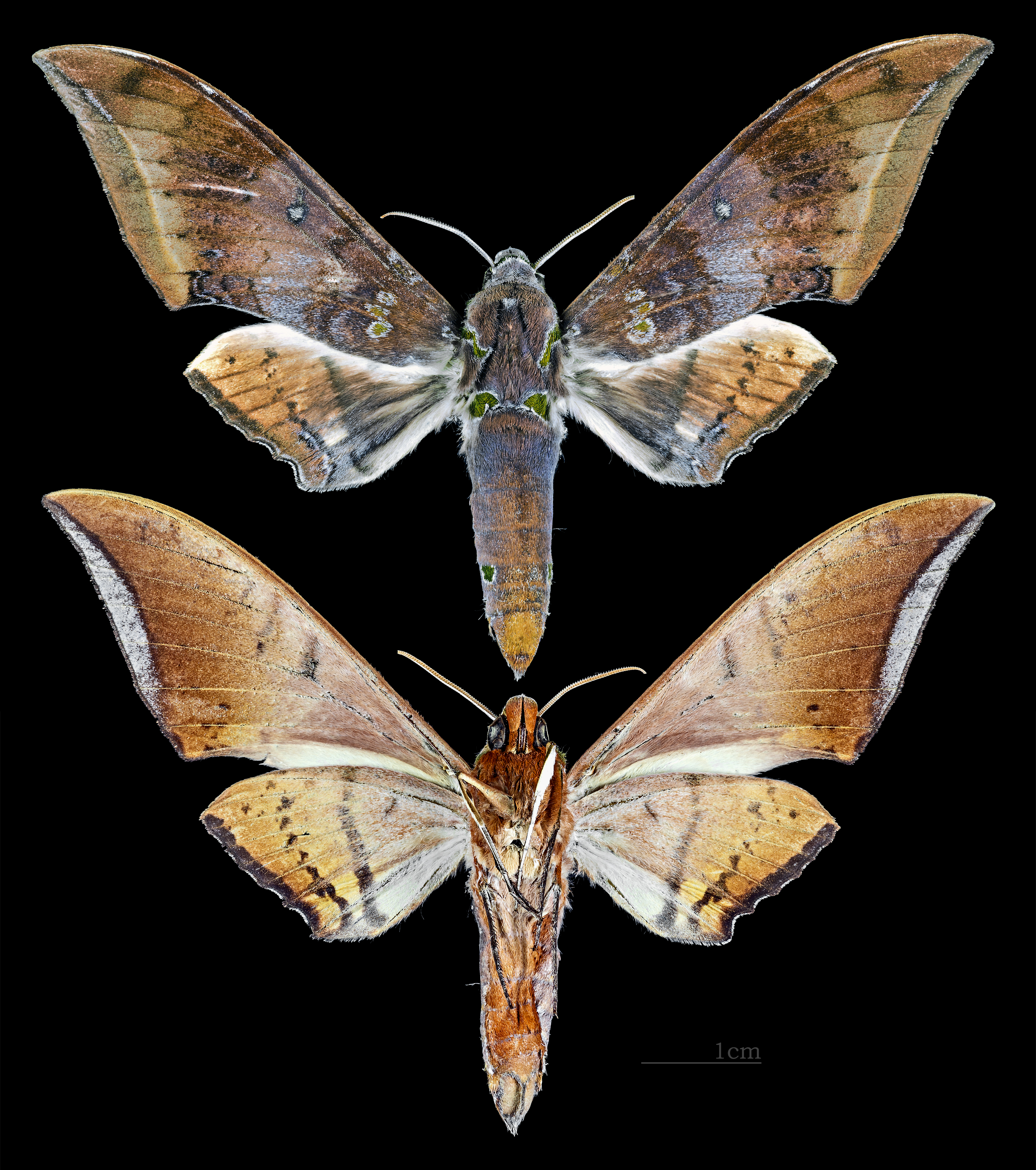
Ambulyx moorei

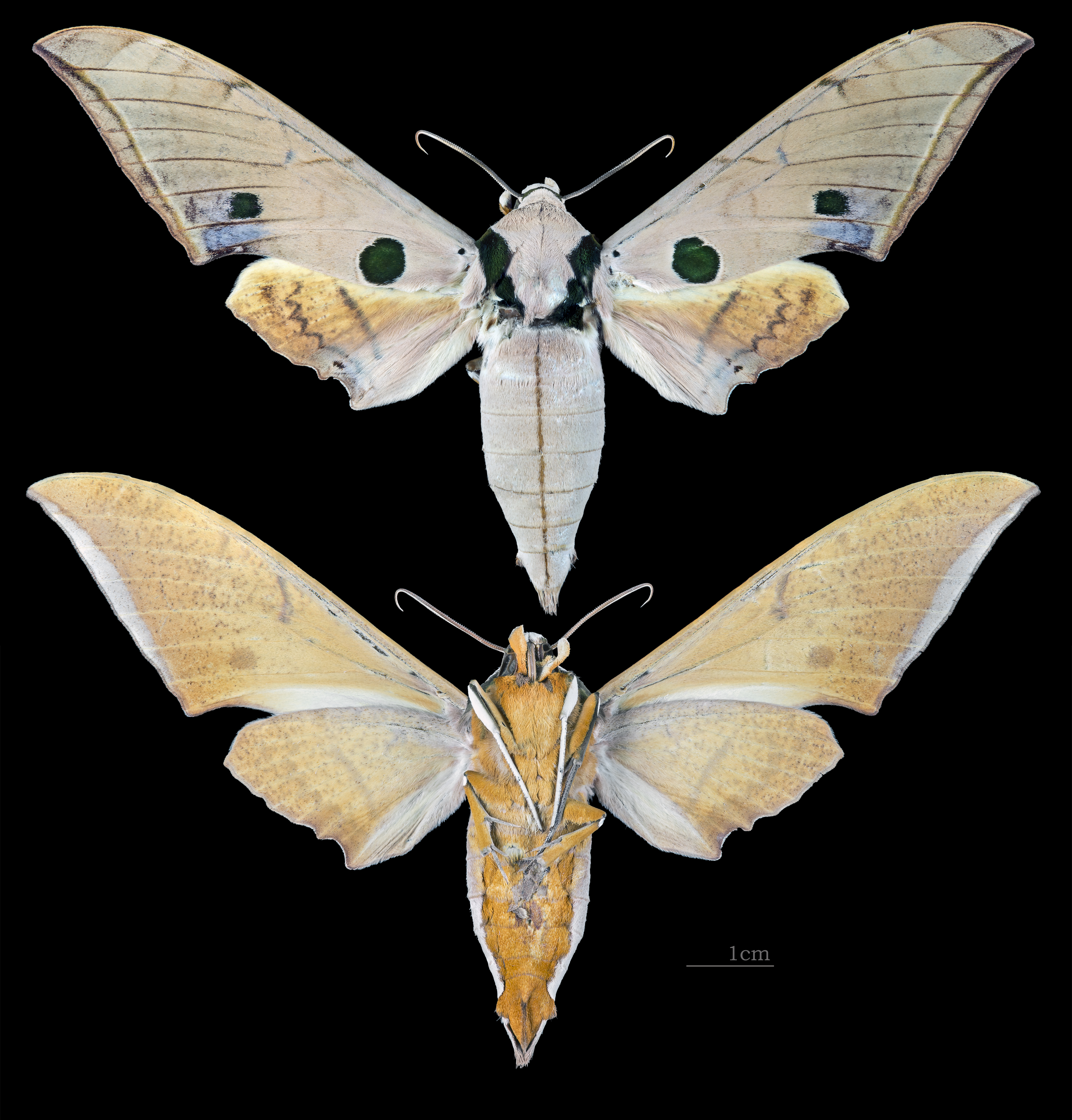
Ambulyx obliterata

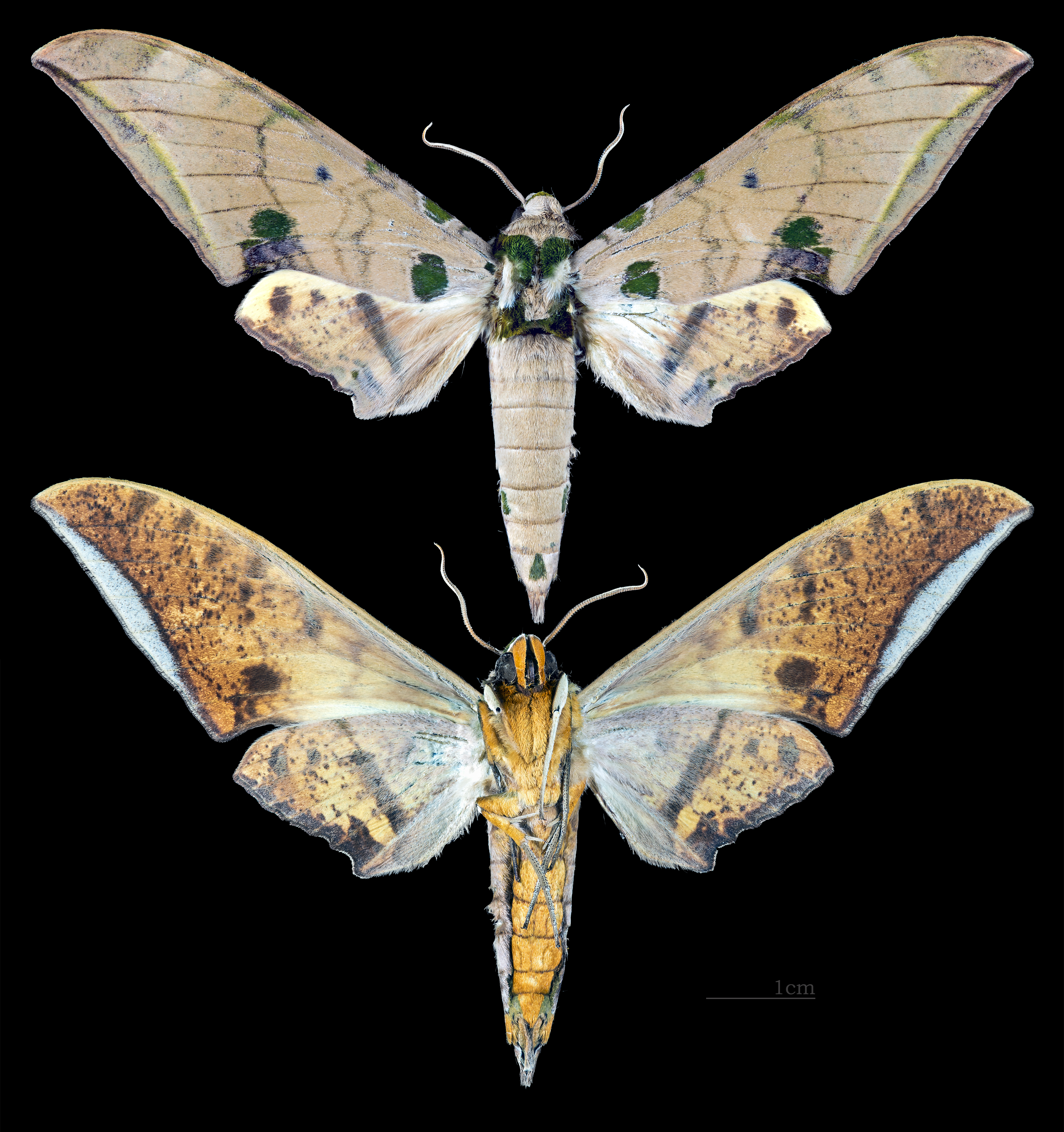
Ambulyx ochracea

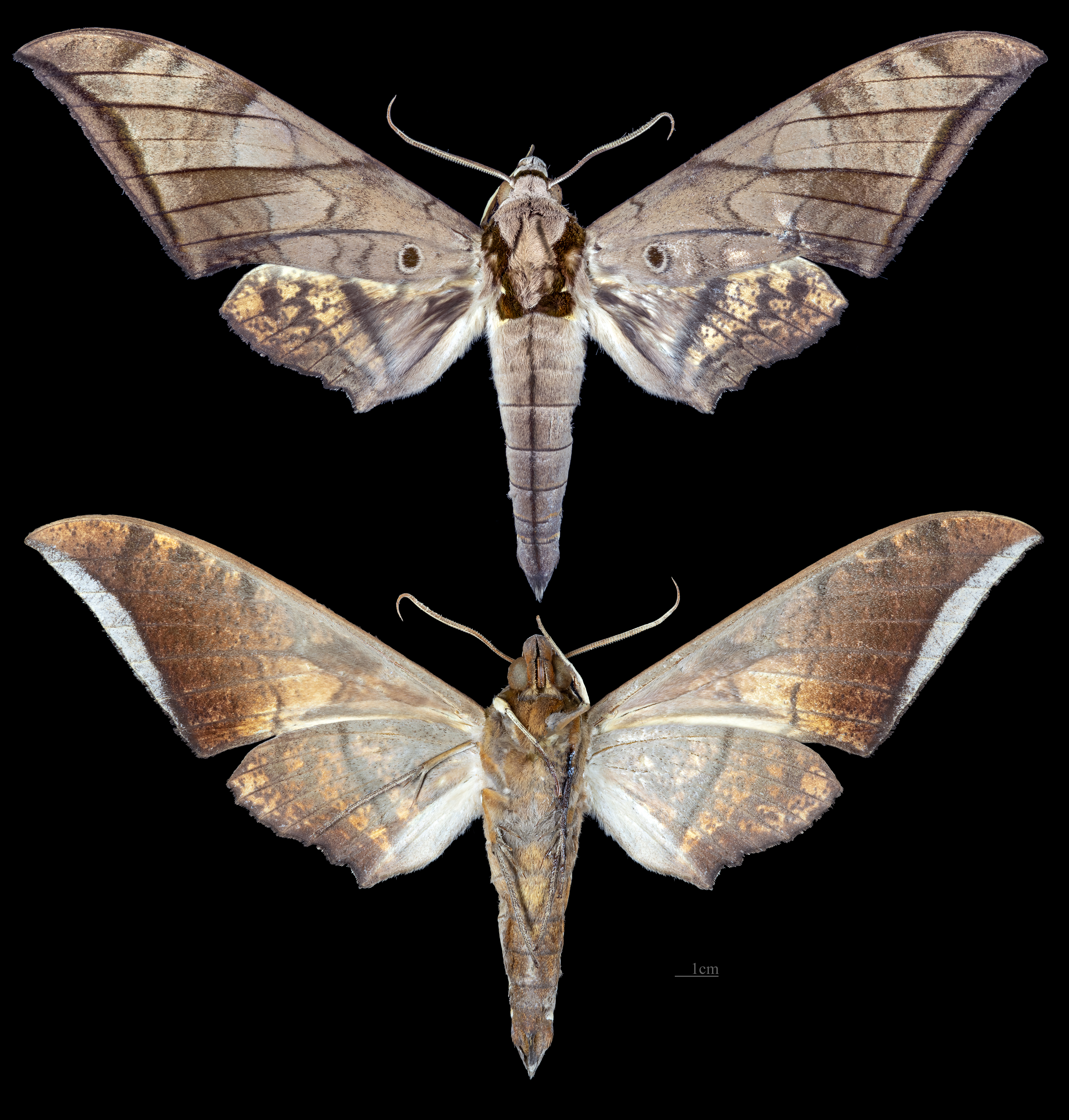
Ambulyx phalaris

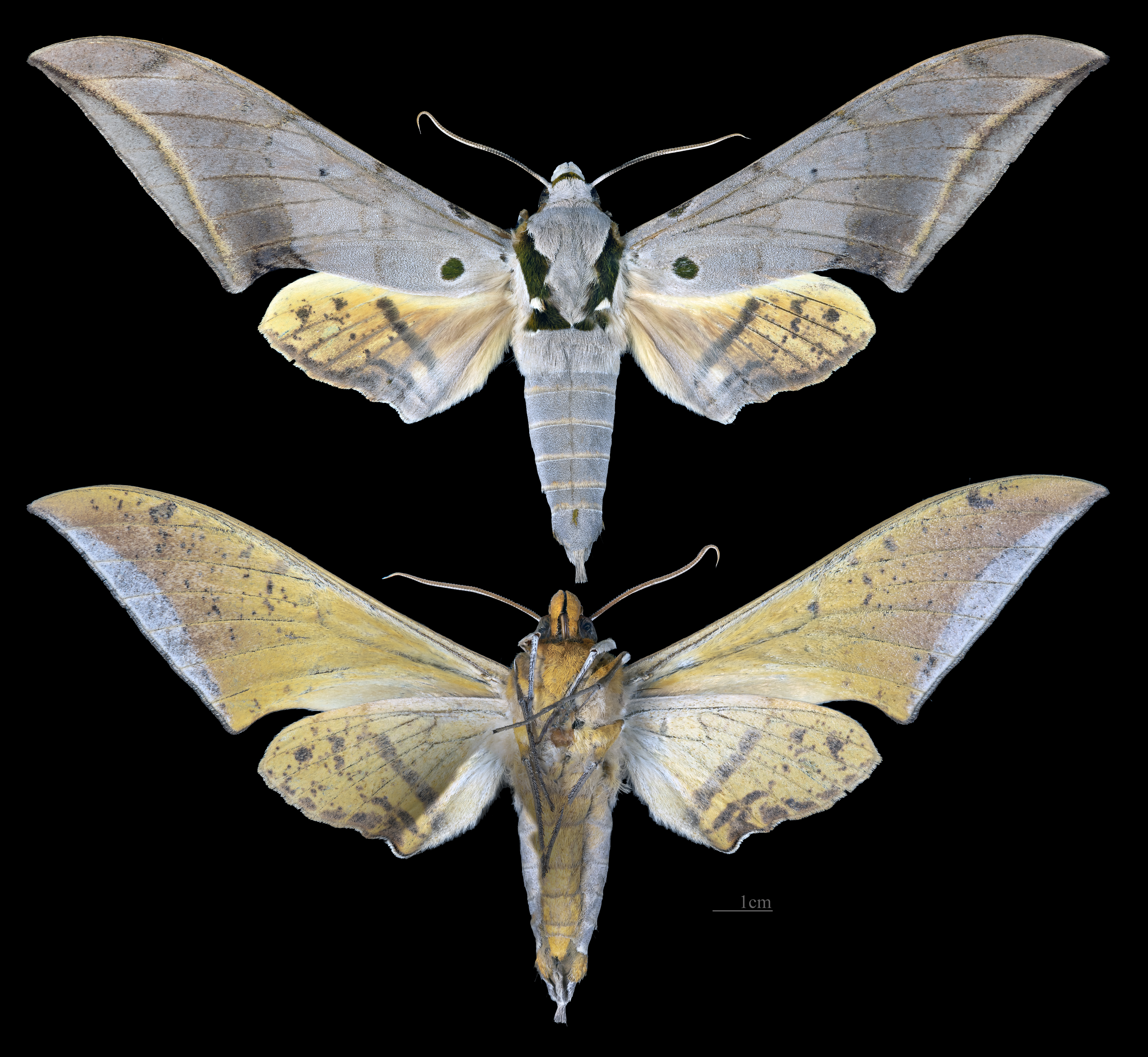
Ambulyx placida

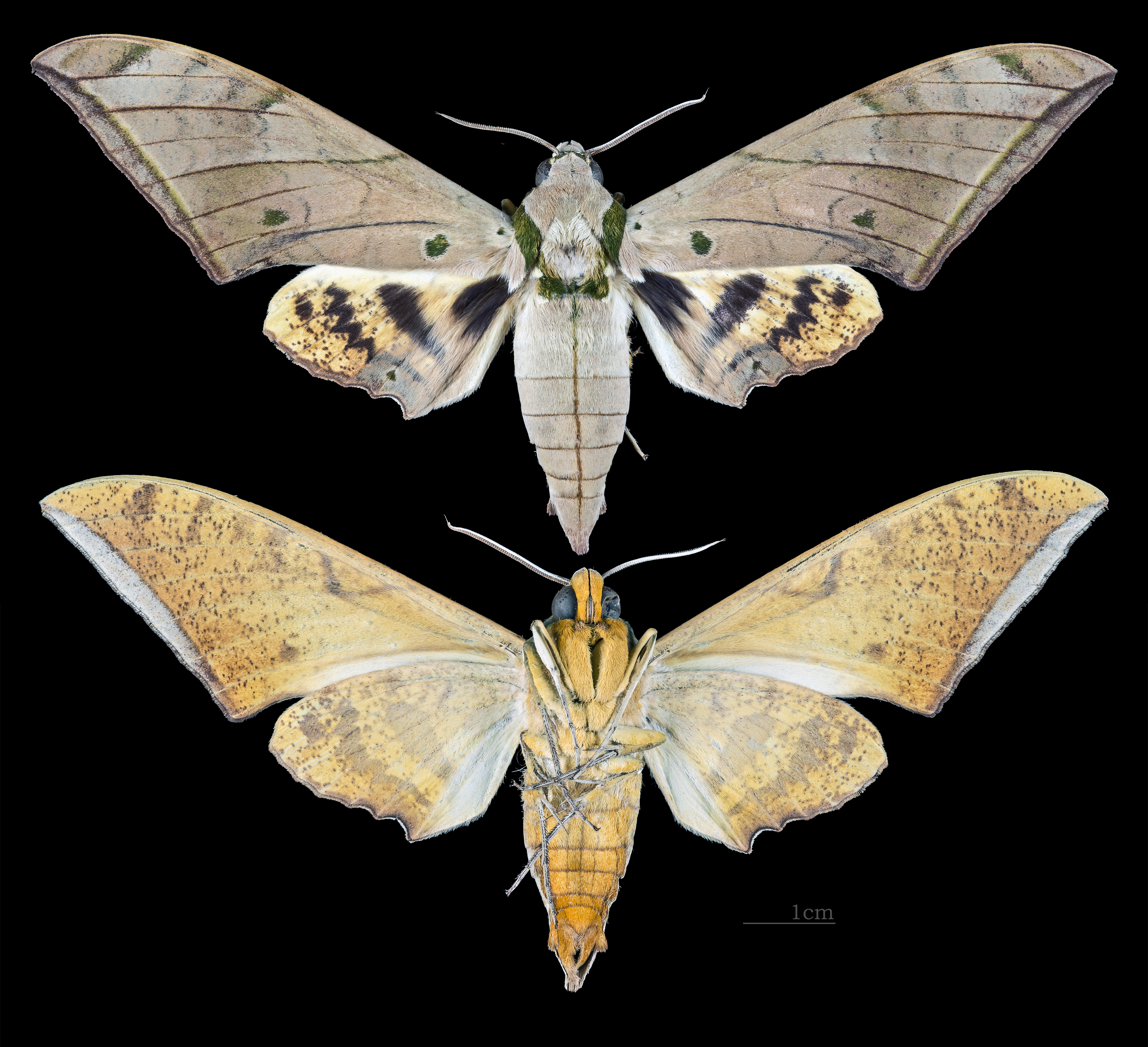
Ambulyx pryeri

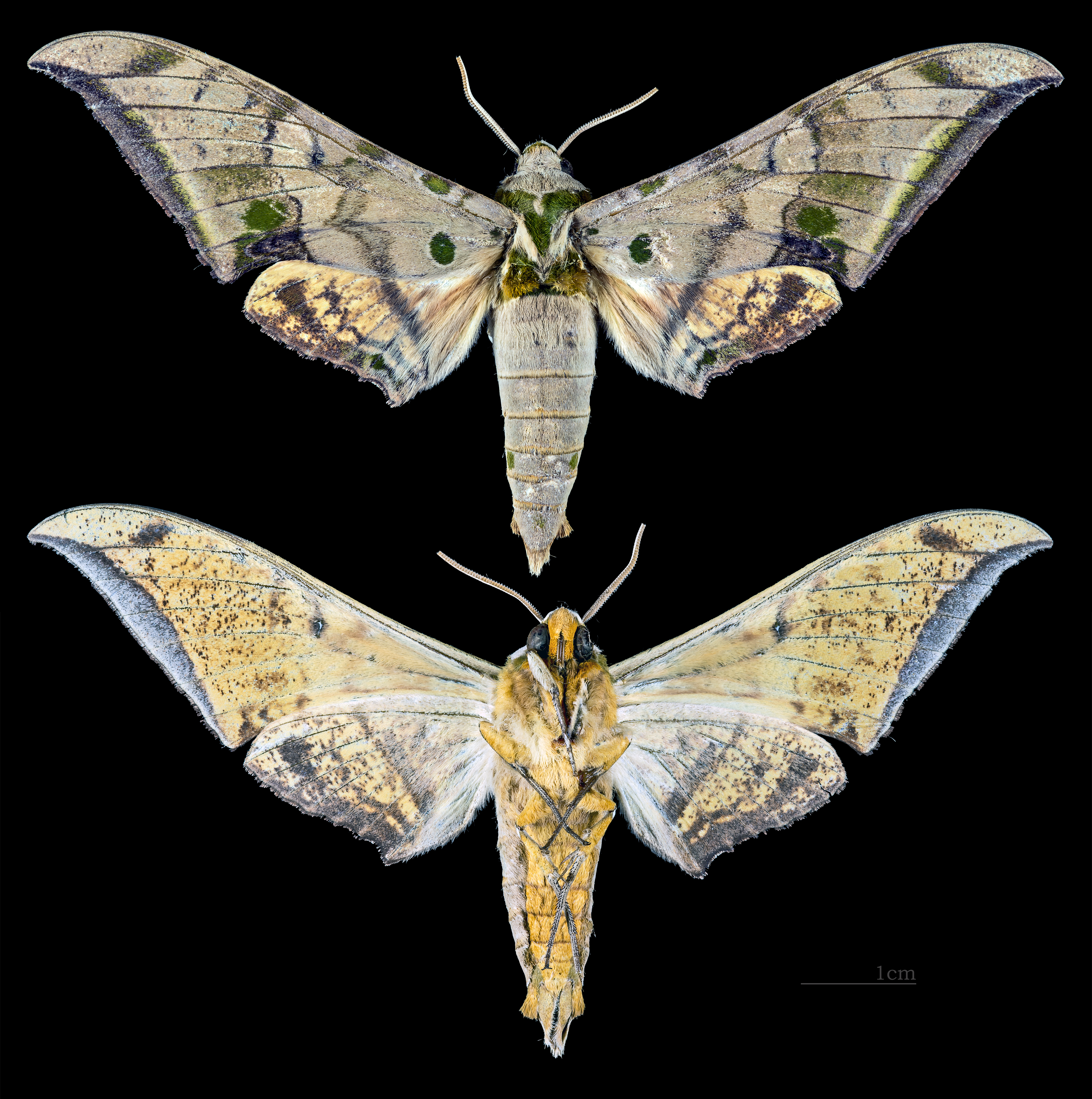
Ambulyx schauffelbergeri

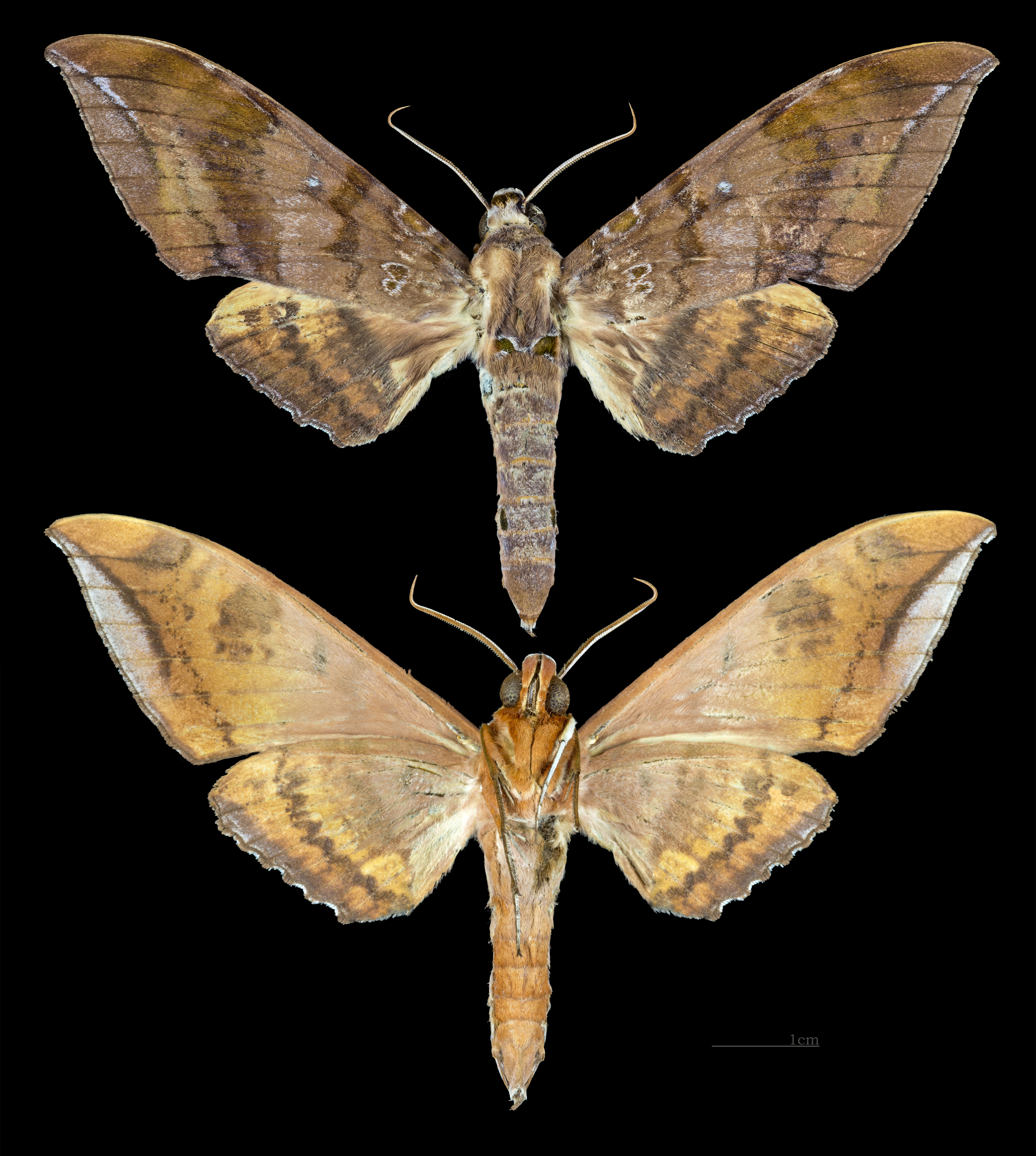
Ambulyx semifervens

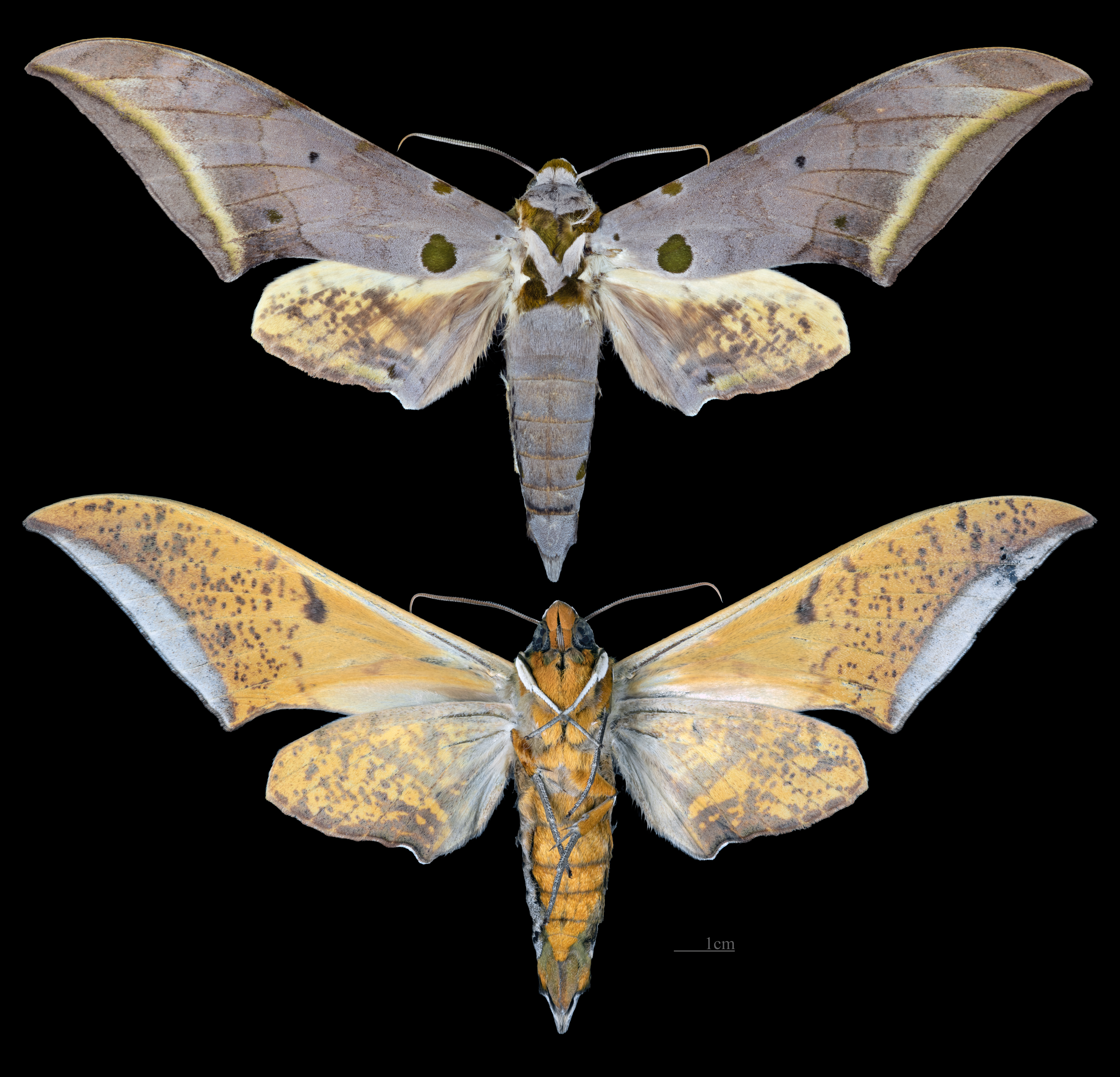
Ambulyx semiplacida

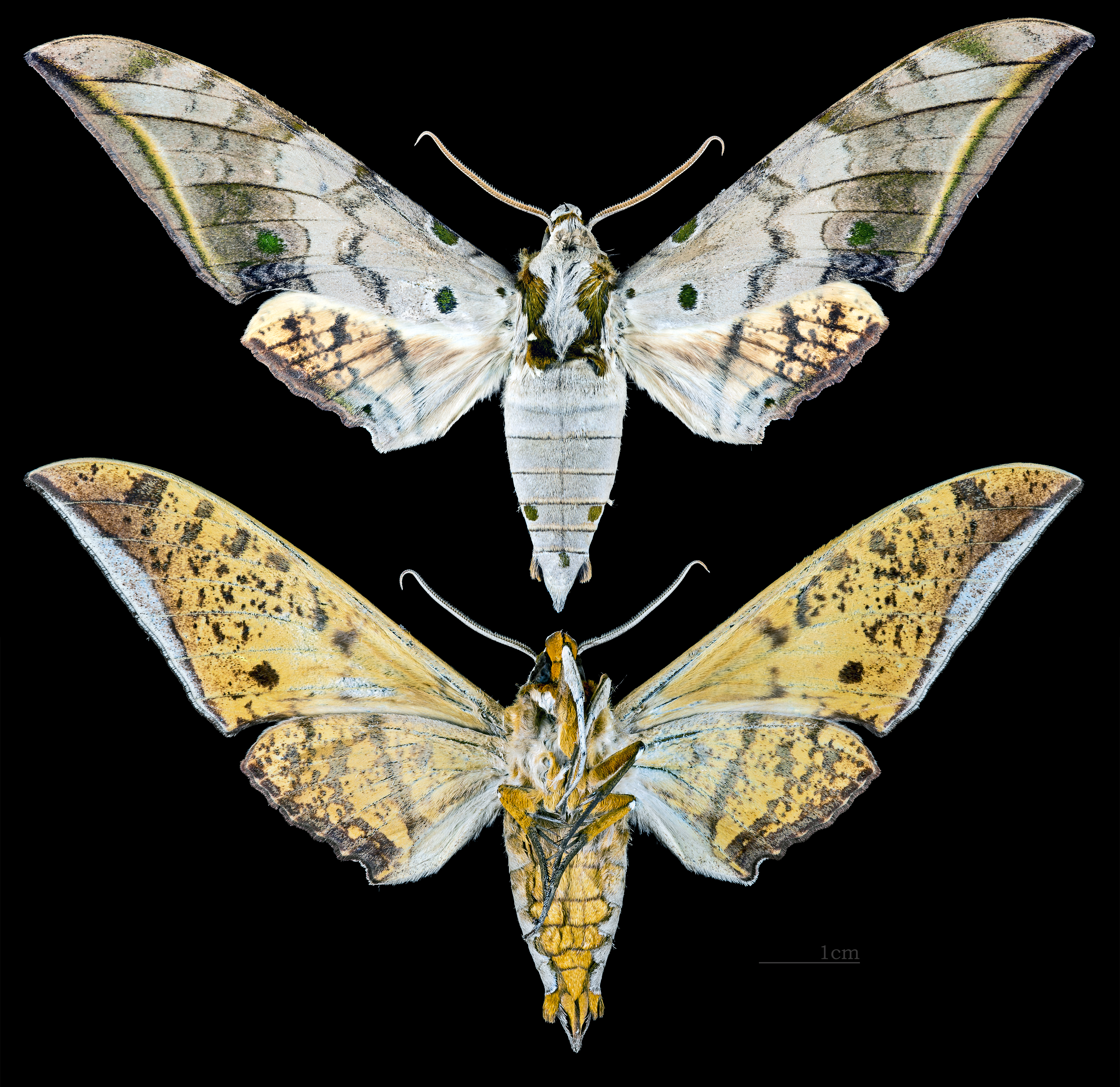
Ambulyx sericeipennis

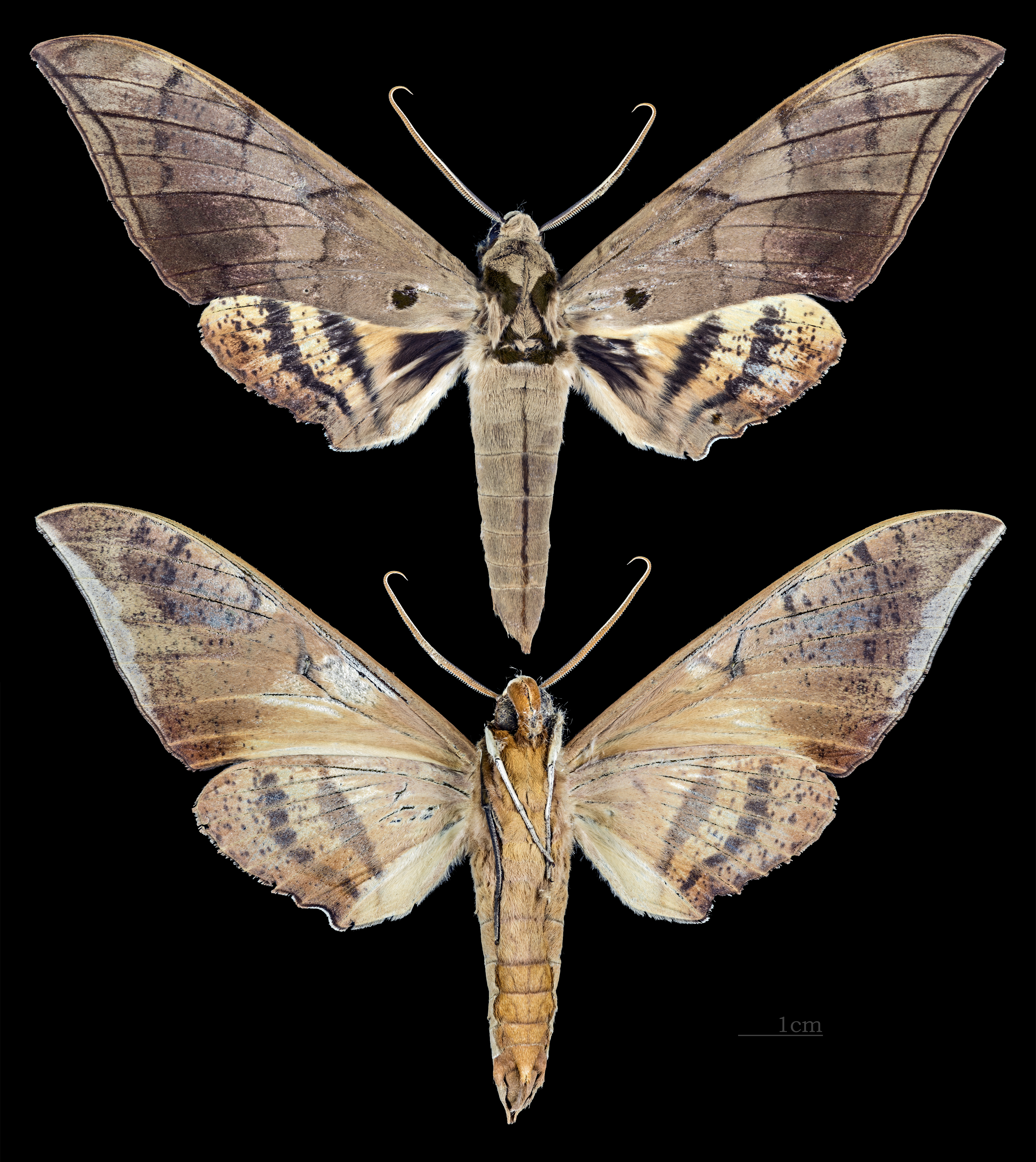
Ambulyx staudingeri

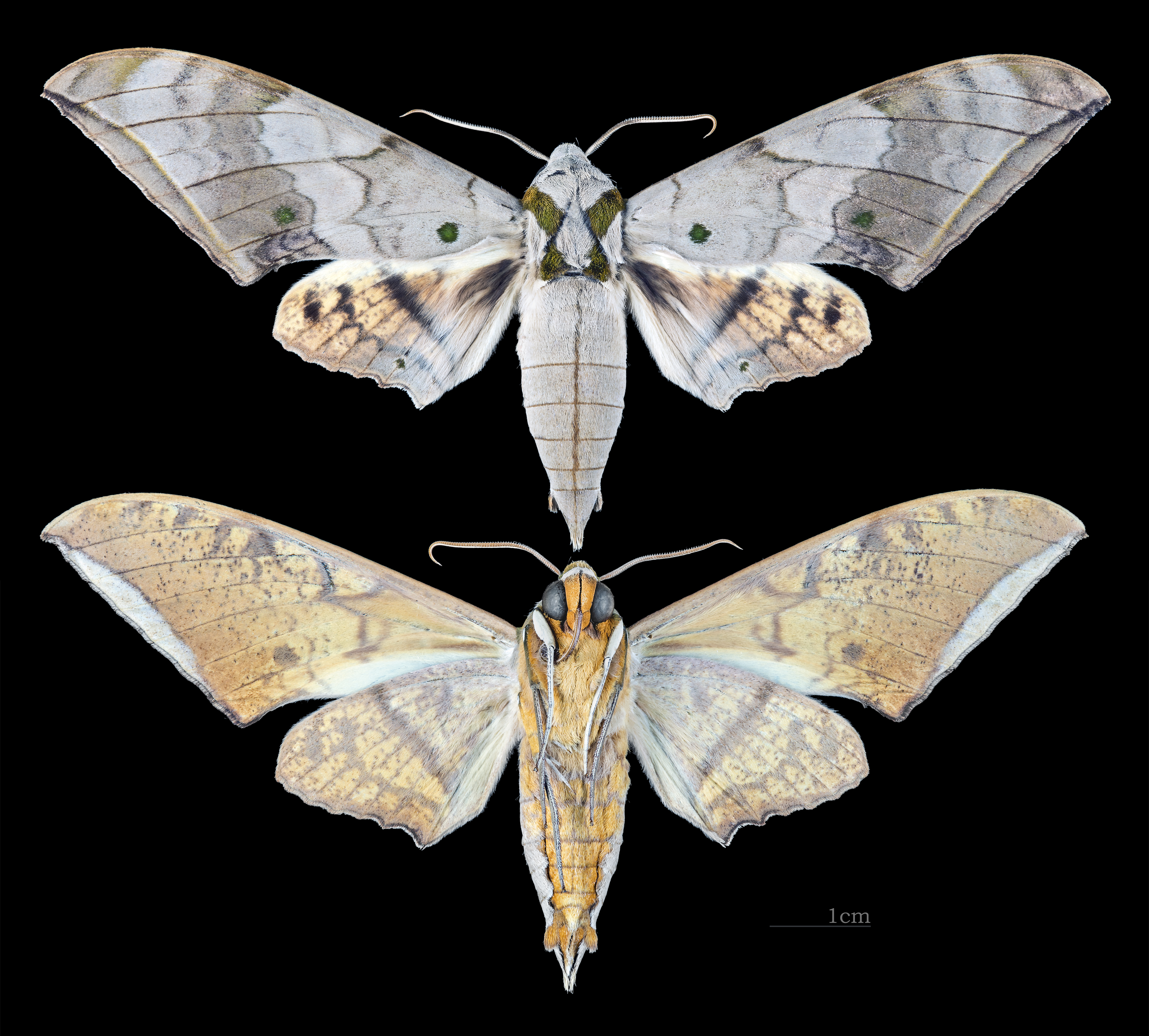
Ambulyx substrigilis

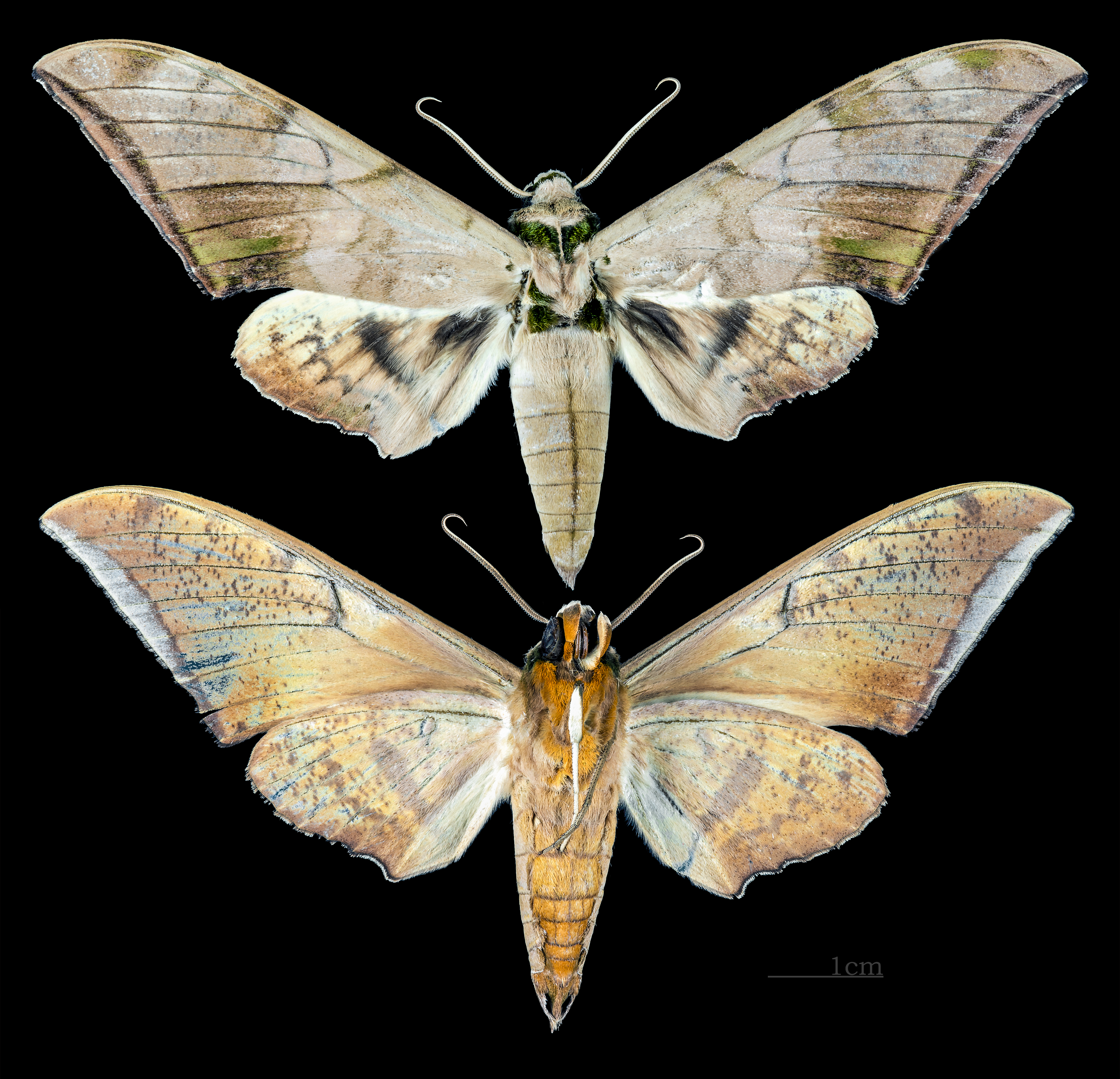
Ambulyx tattina

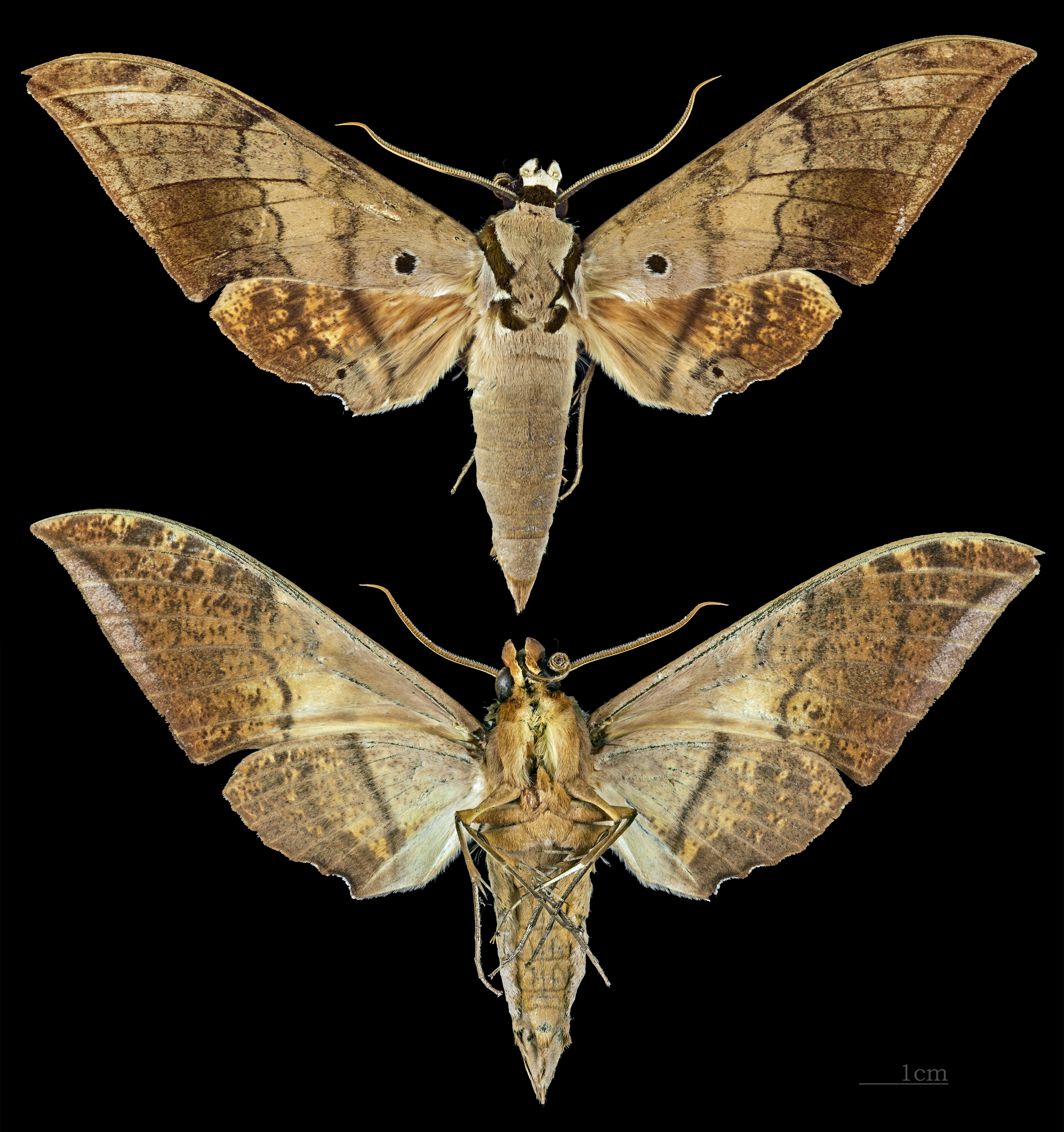
Ambulyx tenimberi

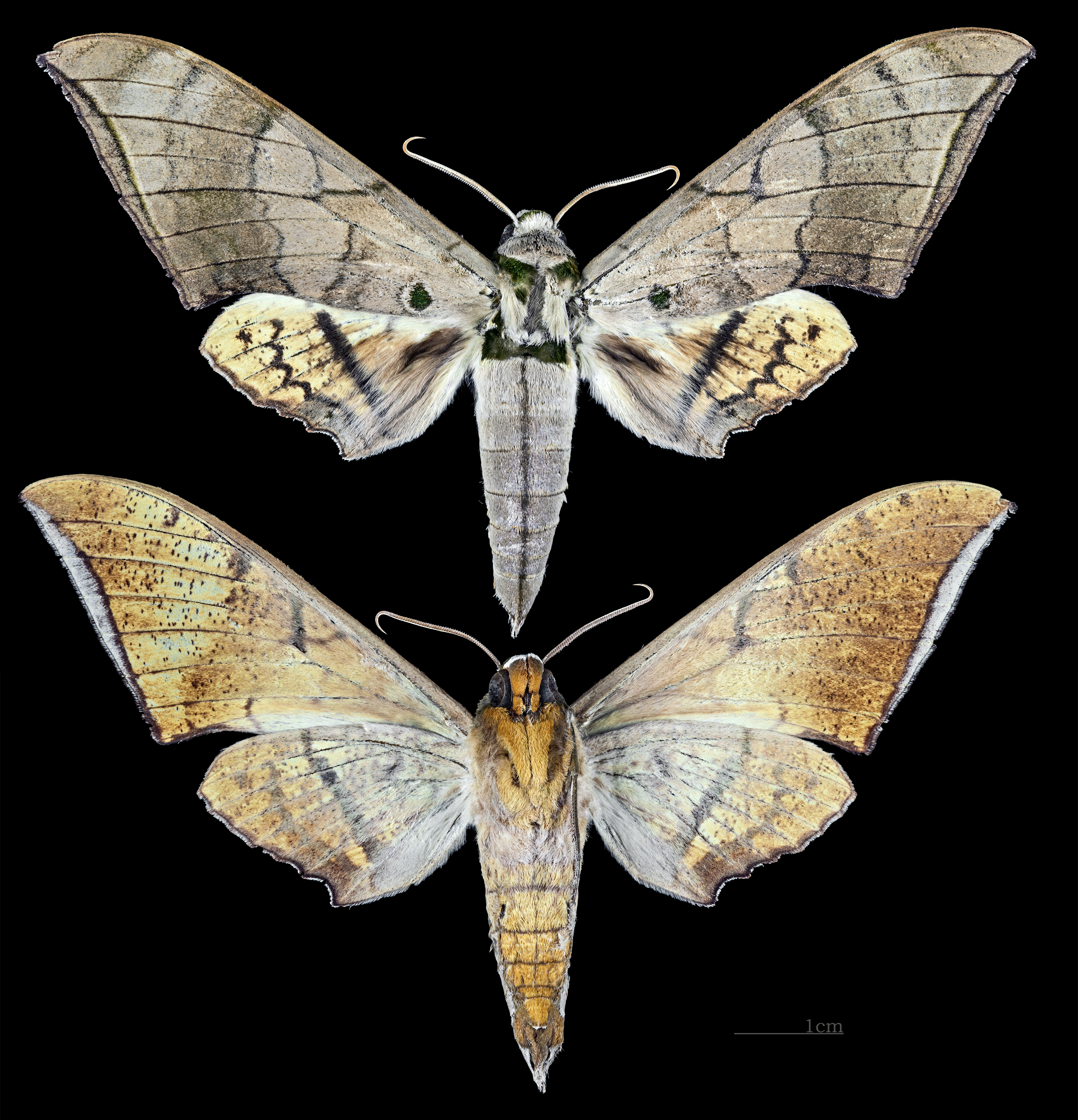
Ambulyx wildei

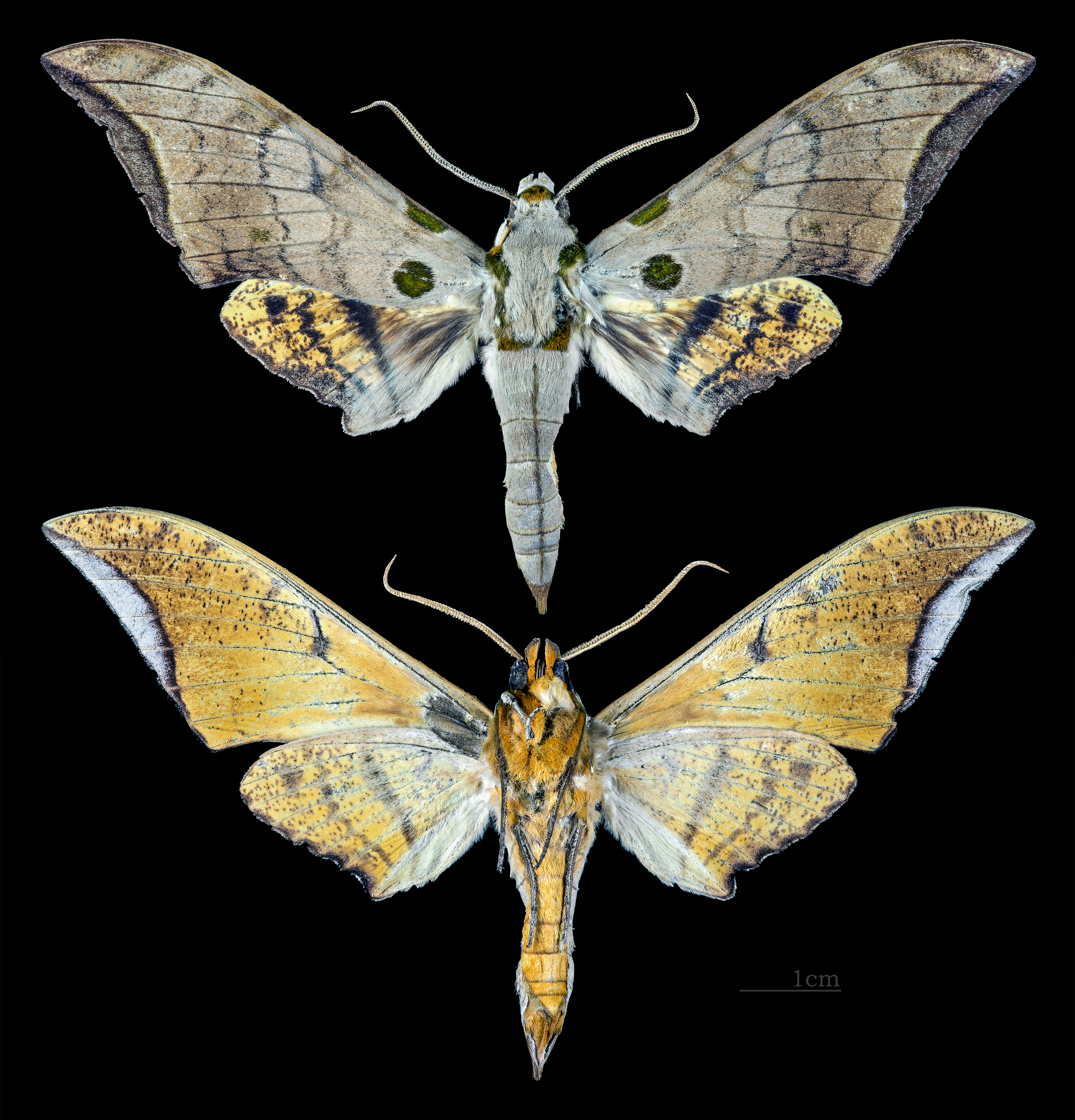
Ambulyx wilemani'
