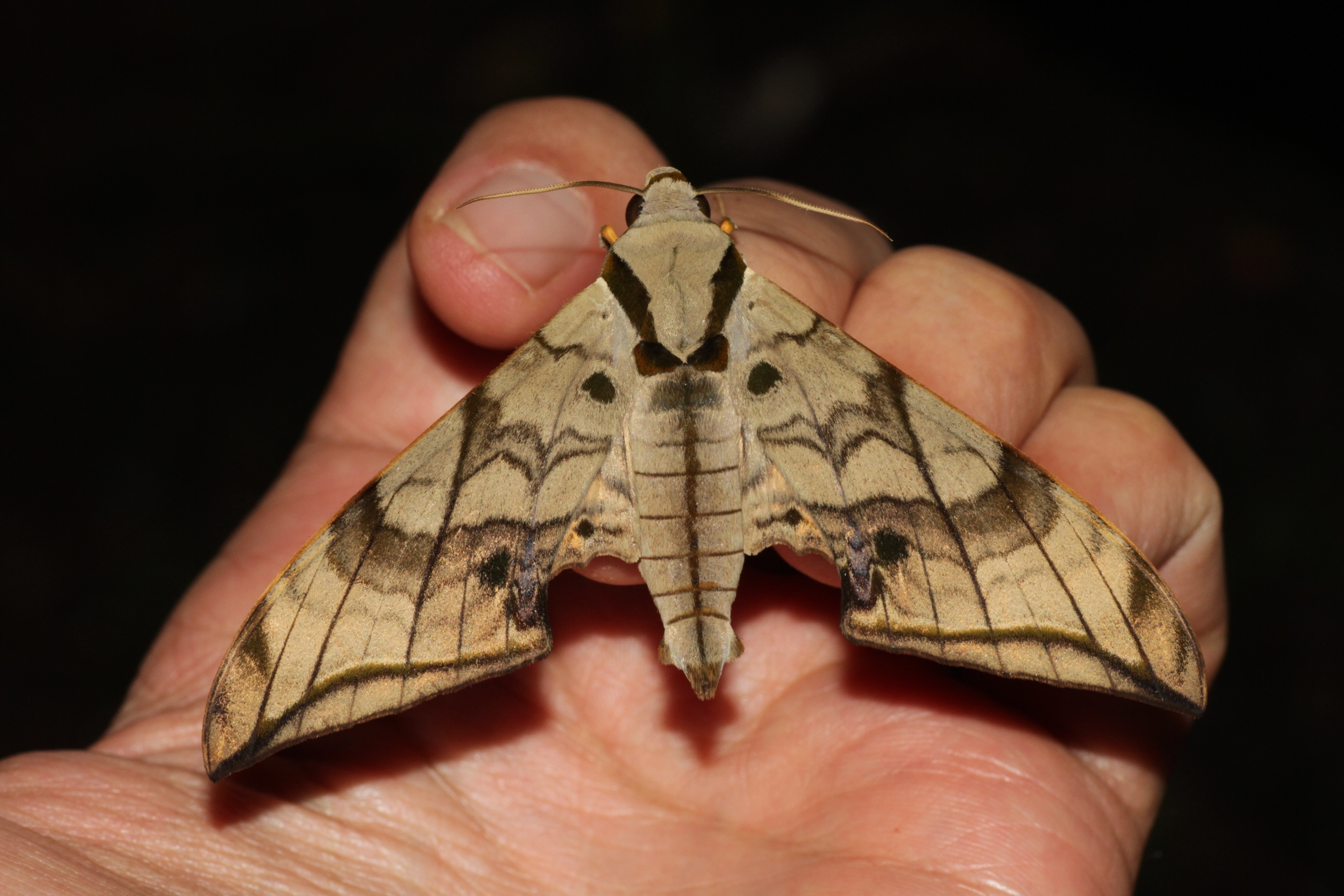

Scientific classification
- Kingdom: Animalia
- Phylum: Arthropoda
- Clade: Pancrustacea
- Class: Insecta
- Order: Lepidoptera
- Family: Sphingidae
- Genus: Ambulyx
- Species: A. zacharovi

Binomial name
- Ambulyx zacharovi Ivshin & Kitching, 2014

= Ambulyx zacharovi =

Species of moth

Ambulyx zacharovi is a species of moth in the family Sphingidae. It was described by Ivshin & Kitching in 2014. It is known from Borneo.
