= Ambulyx suluensis =

Scientific classification
- Kingdom: Animalia
- Phylum: Arthropoda
- Class: Insecta
- Order: Lepidoptera
- Family: Sphingidae
- Genus: Ambulyx
- Species: A. suluensis

Binomial name
- Ambulyx suluensis Hogenes & Treadaway, 1998

Species of moth

Ambulyx suluensis is a species of moth of the family Sphingidae. It is known from the Philippines.
