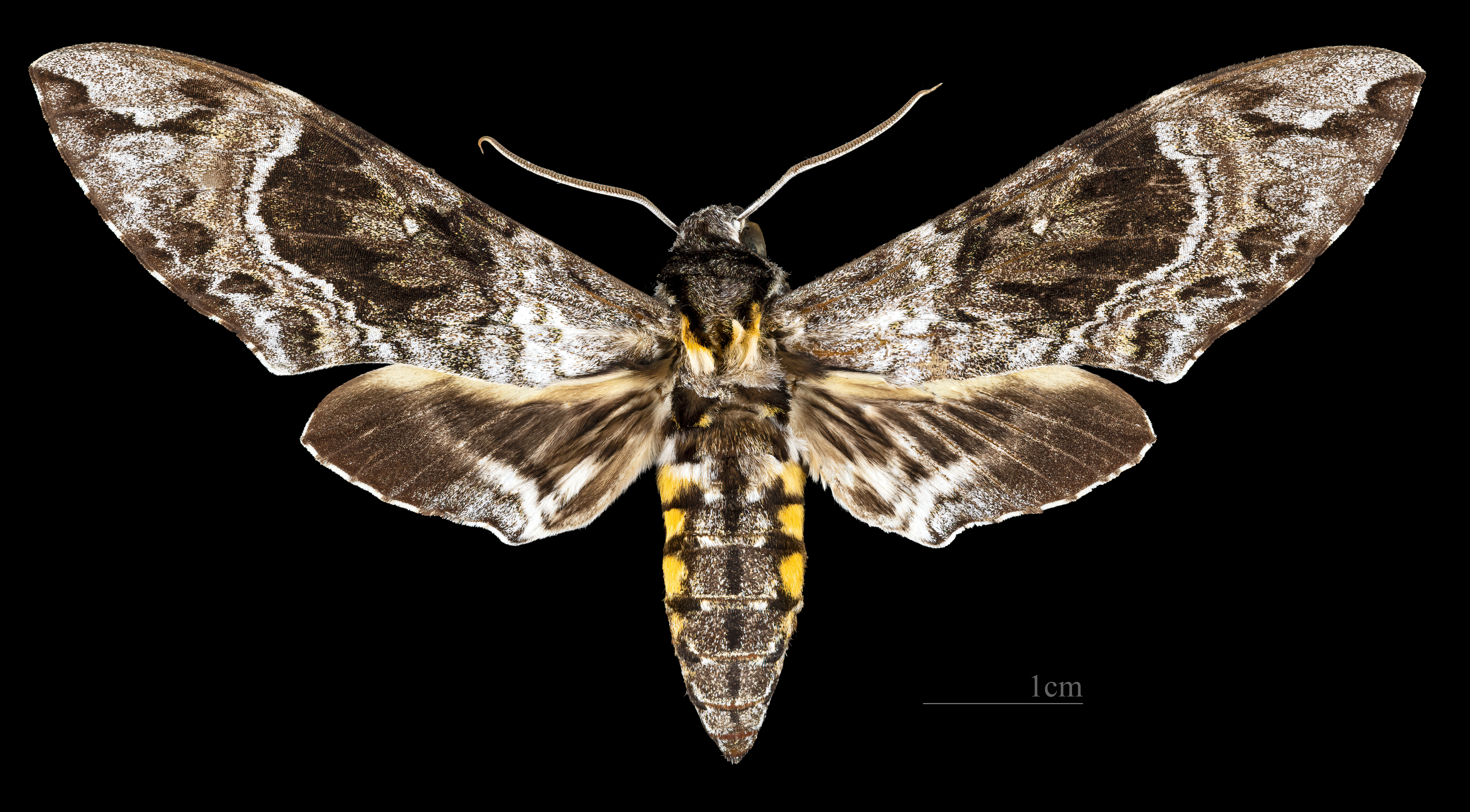
- Manduca brunalba ♂
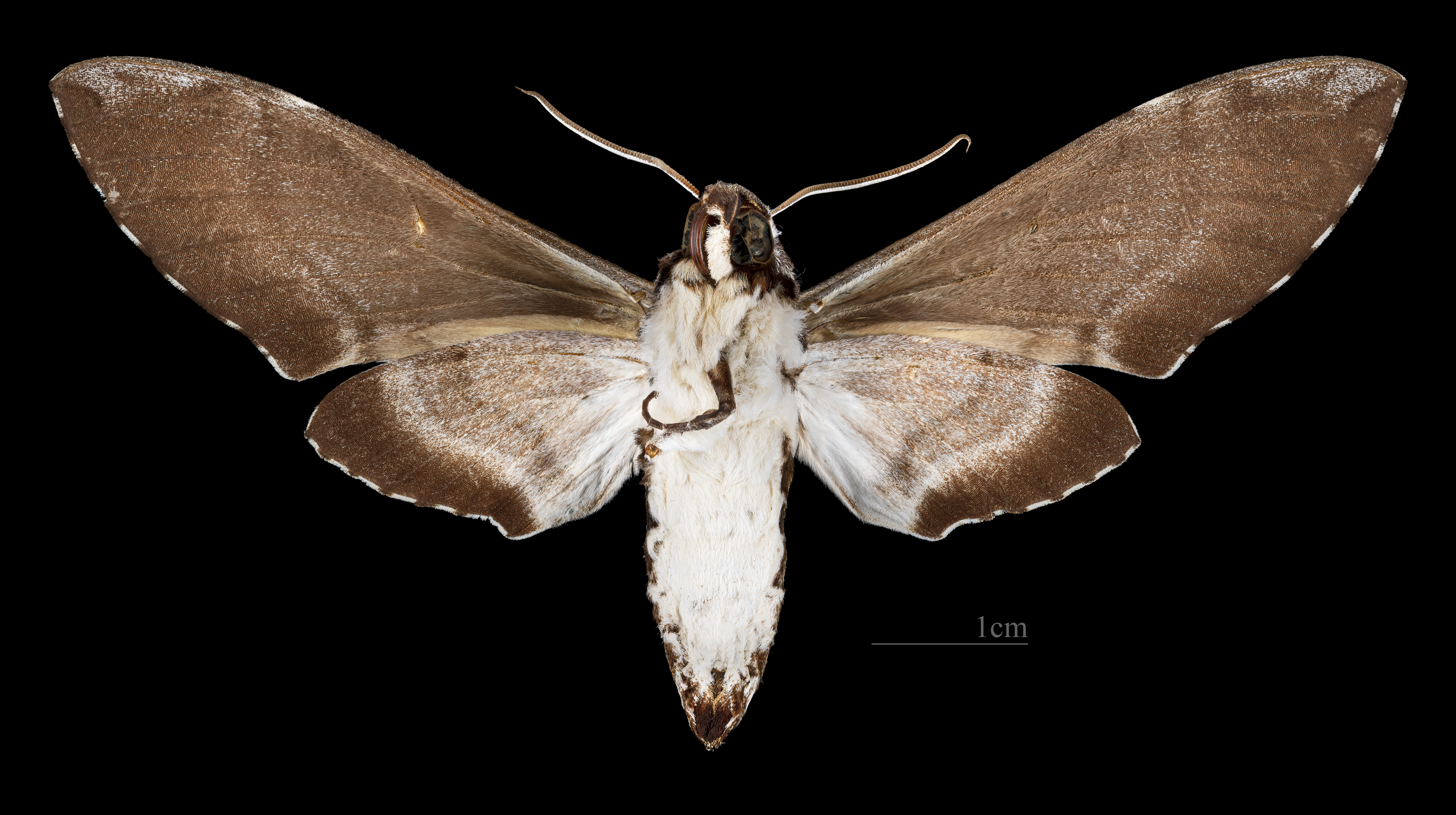
- Manduca brunalba ♂ △

Scientific classification
- Kingdom: Animalia
- Phylum: Arthropoda
- Class: Insecta
- Order: Lepidoptera
- Family: Sphingidae
- Genus: Manduca
- Species: M. brunalba

Binomial name
- Manduca brunalba (B.P. Clark, 1929)

Synonyms
- Protoparce brunalba Clark, 1929; Protoparce centrosplendens Gehlen, 1940

= Manduca brunalba =

Species of moth

Manduca brunalba is a moth of the family Sphingidae. It is known from Brazil, French Guiana, Peru, Venezuela and Bolivia.

The wingspan is about 104 mm.
