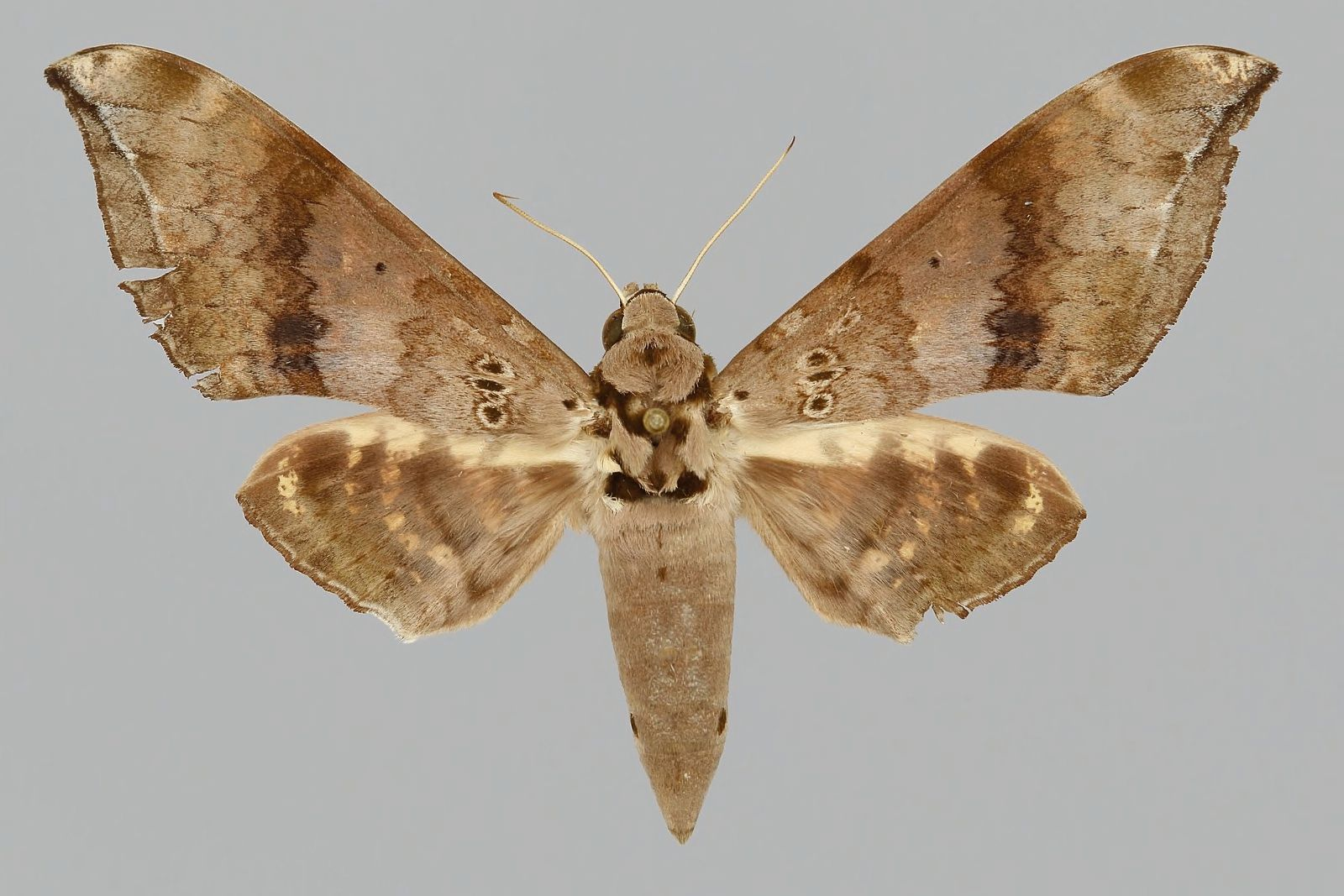

Scientific classification
- Kingdom: Animalia
- Phylum: Arthropoda
- Class: Insecta
- Order: Lepidoptera
- Family: Sphingidae
- Genus: Ambulyx
- Species: A. flava

Binomial name
- Ambulyx flava (Clark, 1924)

Synonyms
- Oxyambulyx canescens flava Clark, 1924; Ambulyx canescens flava (Clark, 1924)

= Ambulyx flava =

Species of moth

Ambulyx flava is a species of moth of the family Sphingidae. It is known from the Philippines.
