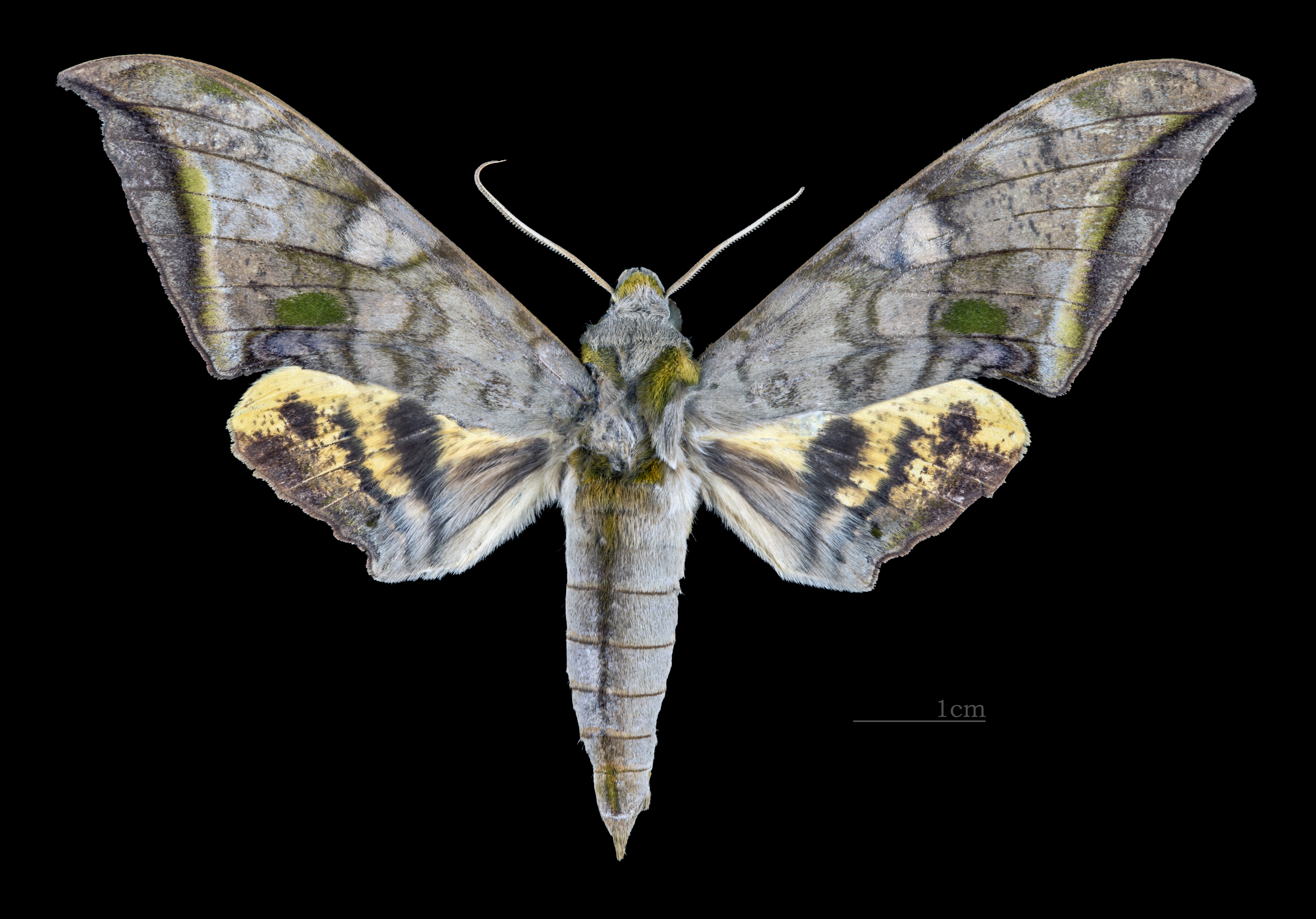
- Ambulyx immaculata male dorsal
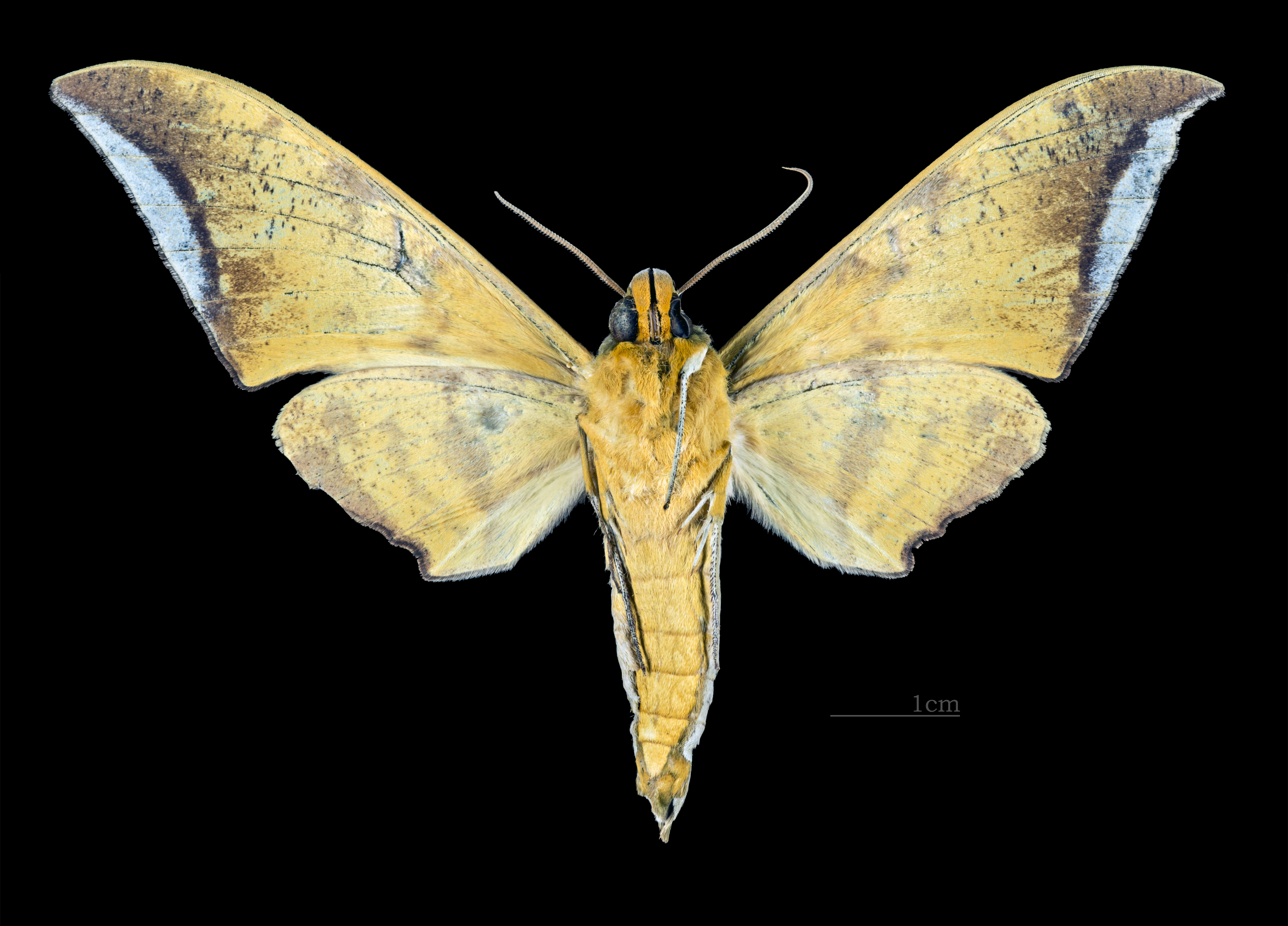
- Ambulyx immaculata male ventral

Scientific classification
- Kingdom: Animalia
- Phylum: Arthropoda
- Class: Insecta
- Order: Lepidoptera
- Family: Sphingidae
- Genus: Ambulyx
- Species: A. immaculata

Binomial name
- Ambulyx immaculata (Clark, 1924)

Synonyms
- Oxyambulyx immaculata Clark, 1924

= Ambulyx immaculata =

Species of moth

Ambulyx immaculata is a species of moth of the family Sphingidae. It is known from the Philippines.
