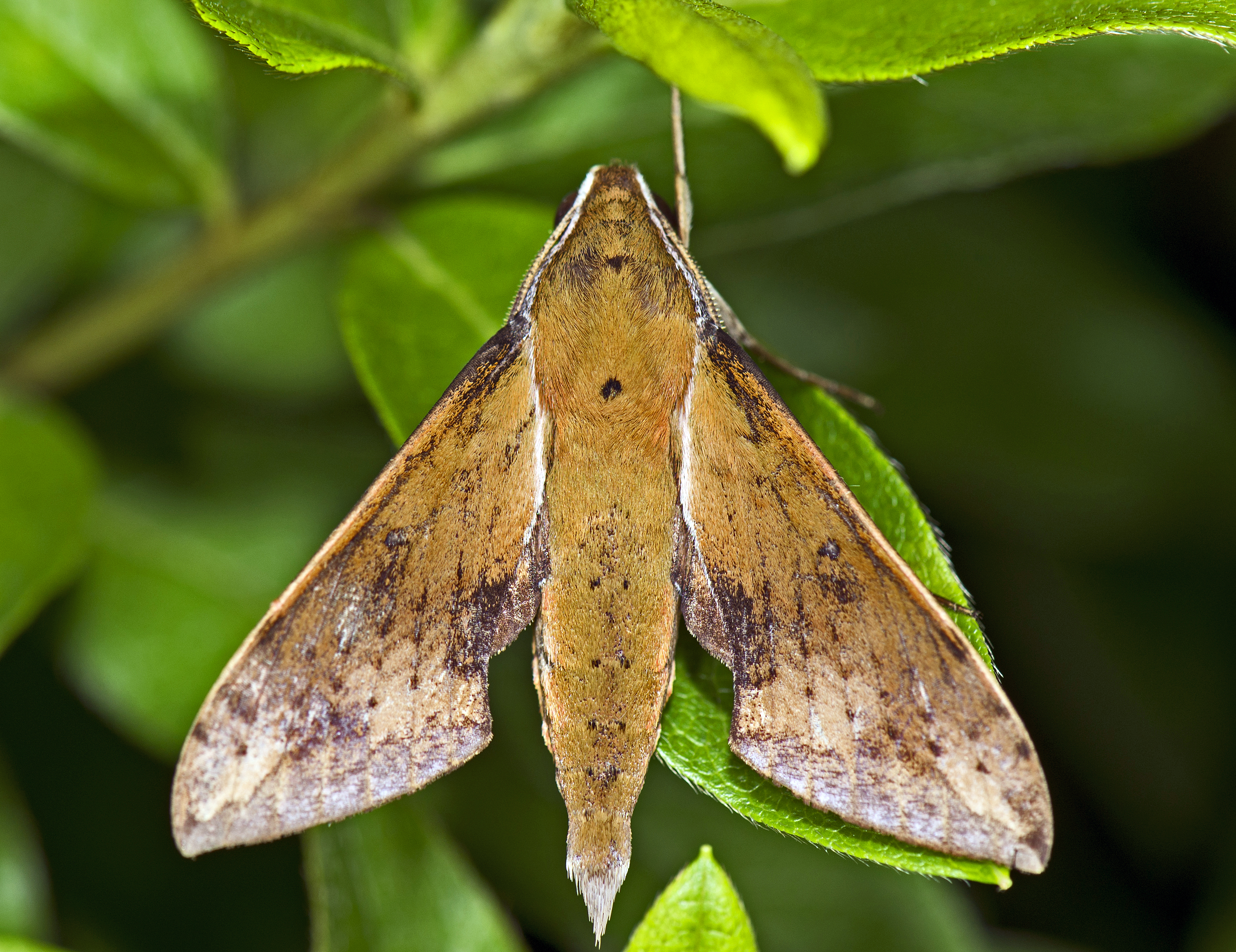

Scientific classification
- Kingdom: Animalia
- Phylum: Arthropoda
- Class: Insecta
- Order: Lepidoptera
- Family: Sphingidae
- Genus: Rhagastis
- Species: R. castor

Binomial name
- Rhagastis castor (Walker, 1856)

Synonyms
- Pergesa castor Walker, 1856; Rhagastis aurantiacus Rothschild, 1900; Rhagastis javanica Roepke, 1941; Rhagastis aurifera sumatranus Clark, 1924; Rhagastis aurifera chinensis Mell, 1922; Pergesa castor aurifera Butler, 1875

= Rhagastis castor =

Species of moth

Rhagastis castor is a moth of the family Sphingidae first described by Francis Walker in 1856.

== Distribution ==
It is known from Nepal, north-eastern India, Thailand, southern China and Vietnam, Sumatra, Java and Taiwan.

== Description ==
The wingspan is 53–84 mm. It is similar to Rhagastis acuta and Rhagastis velata but larger, the forewings and hindwings are more elongate. It is distinguishable by the combination of the dark connection between the marginal band and the basal area on the forewing underside and the well developed abdominal golden stripes. The forewing underside marginal area is joined to the basal area by a streak. The third postmedian line is marked by a series of large and conspicuous black vein dots. The forewing and hindwing median area has a conspicuous red or salmon pink flush.

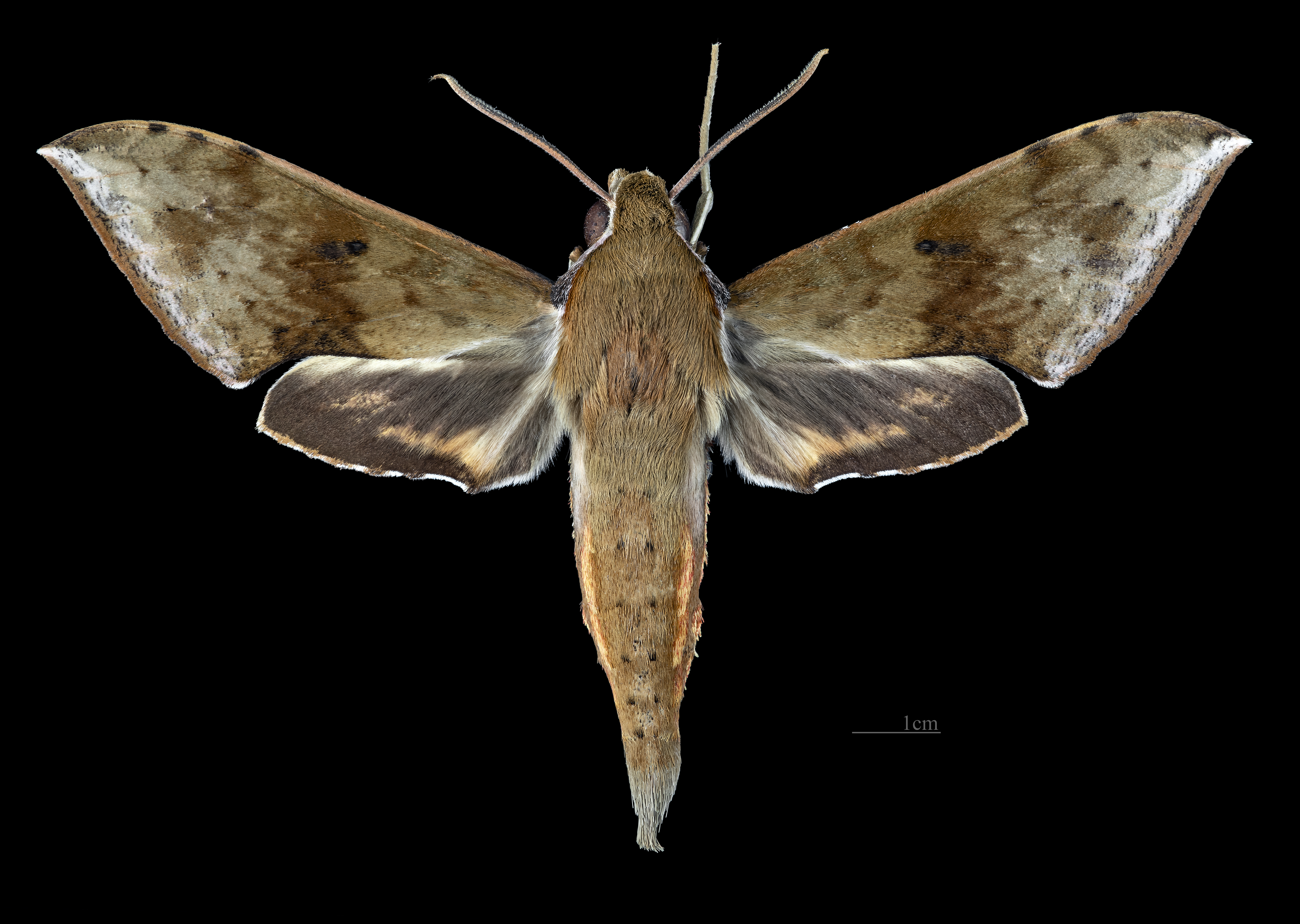
R. c. castor dorsal view

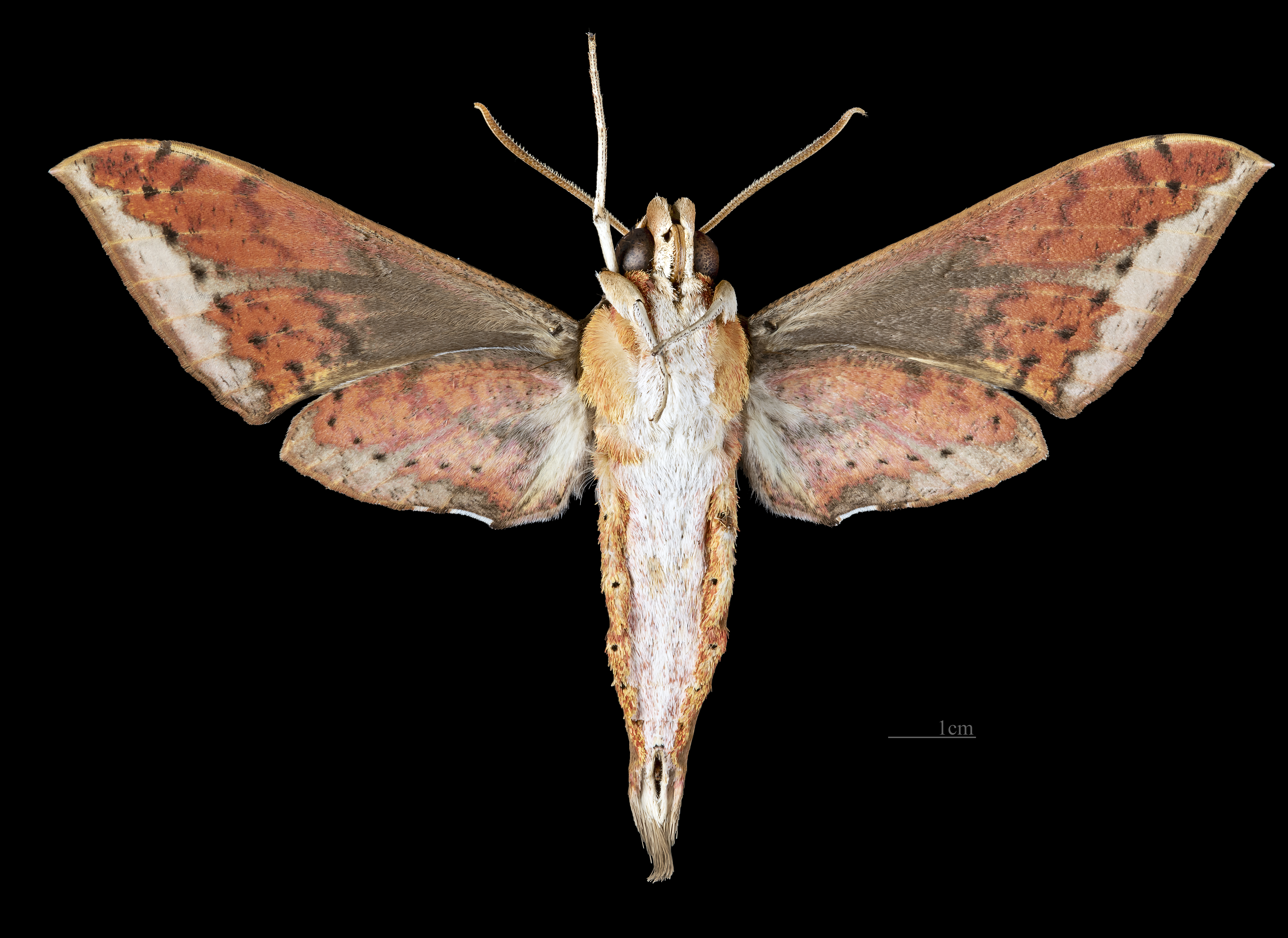
R. c. castor ventral view

== Biology ==
Larvae of subspecies R. c. aurifera have been recorded feeding on Amorphophallus and Vitis species in India. The larvae of subspecies R. c. formosana feed on Saurauia species.

== Subspecies ==
- Rhagastis castor castor (Sumatra and Java)
- Rhagastis castor aurifera (Butler, 1875) (Nepal, north-eastern India, Thailand, southern China and Vietnam)
- Rhagastis castor formosana Clark, 1925 (Taiwan)
- Rhagastis castor jordani Oberthür, 1904 (southern China)
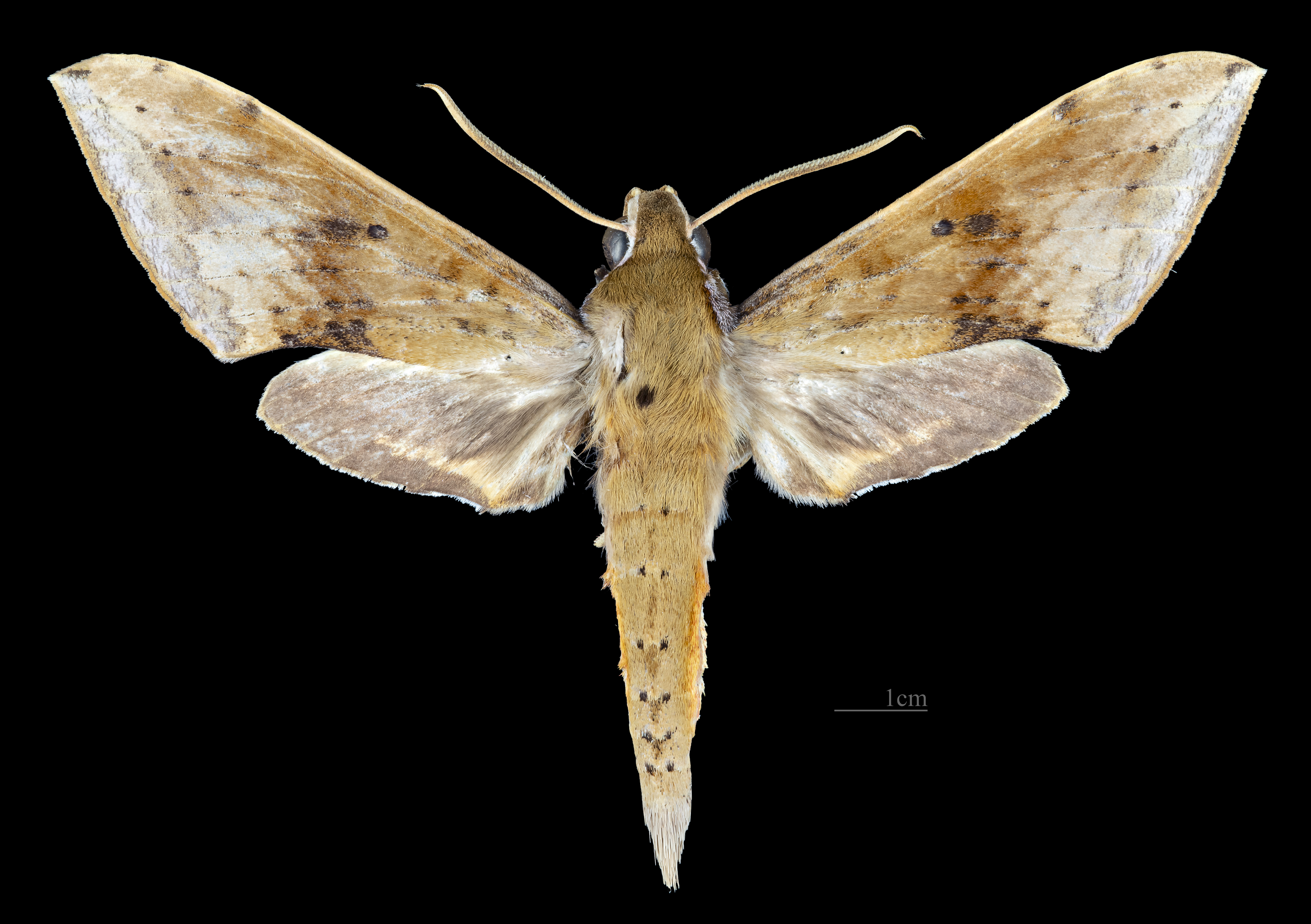
R. c. aurifera, dorsal view

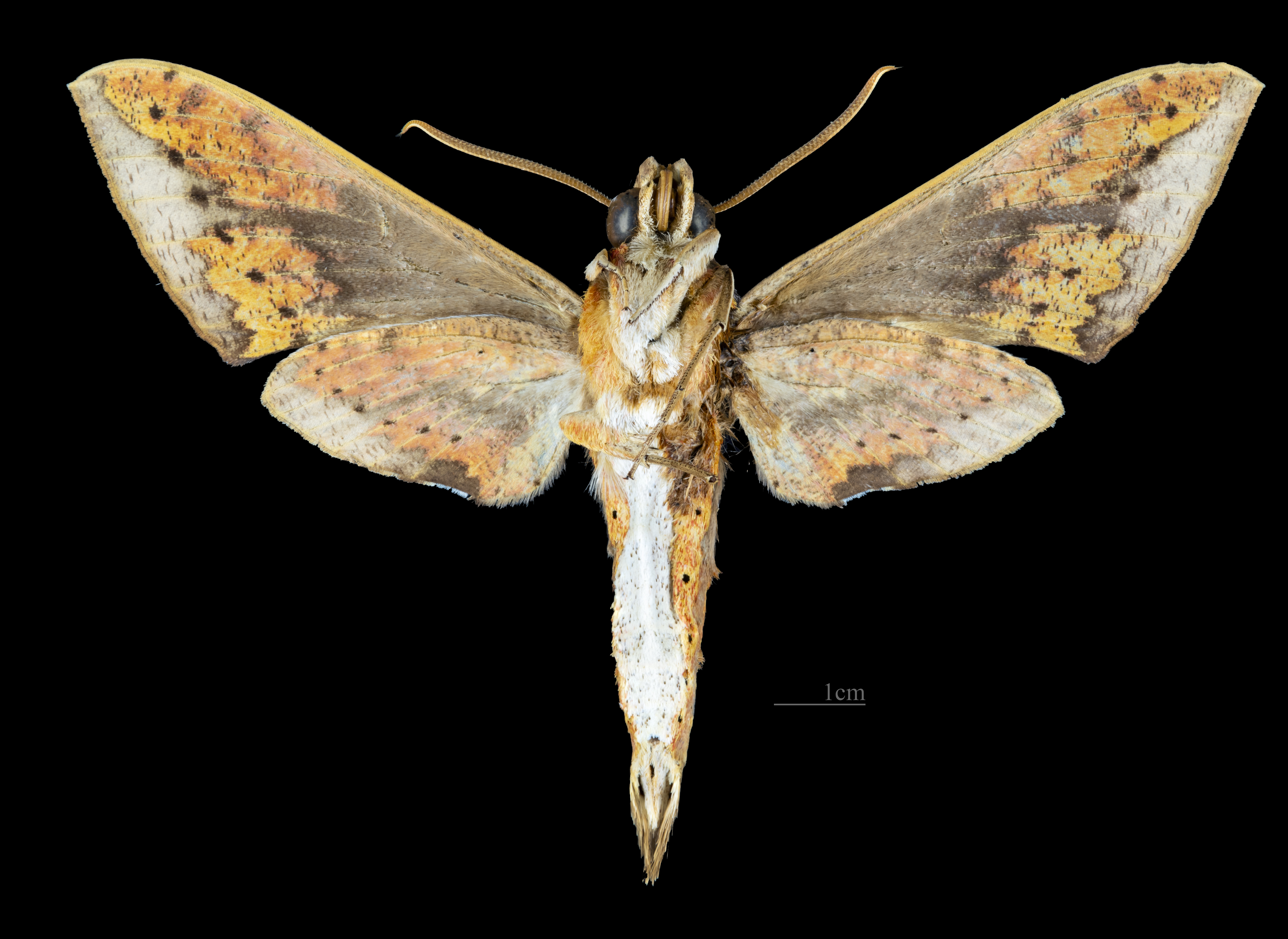
R. c. aurifera, ventral view

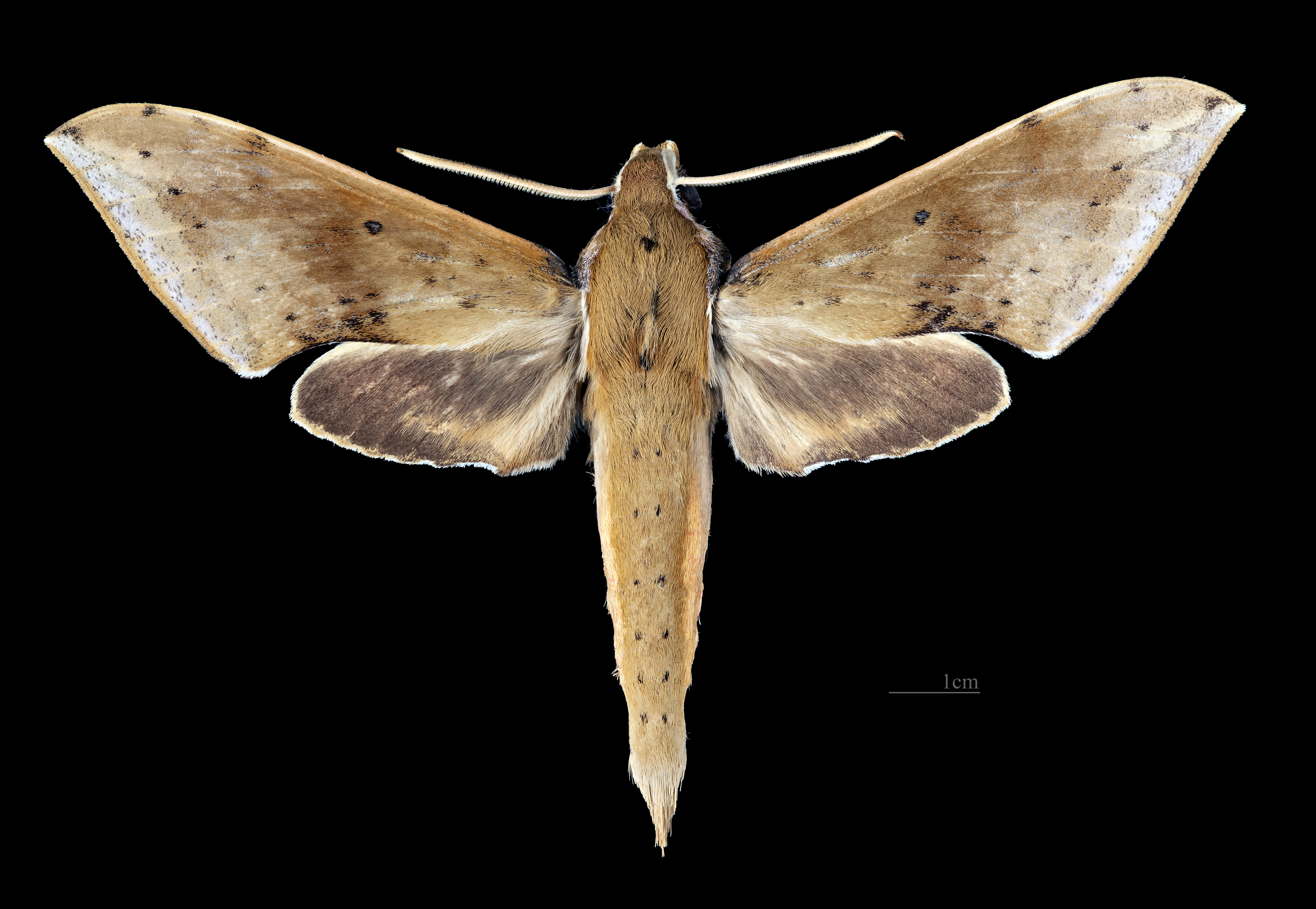
R. c. formosana, dorsal view

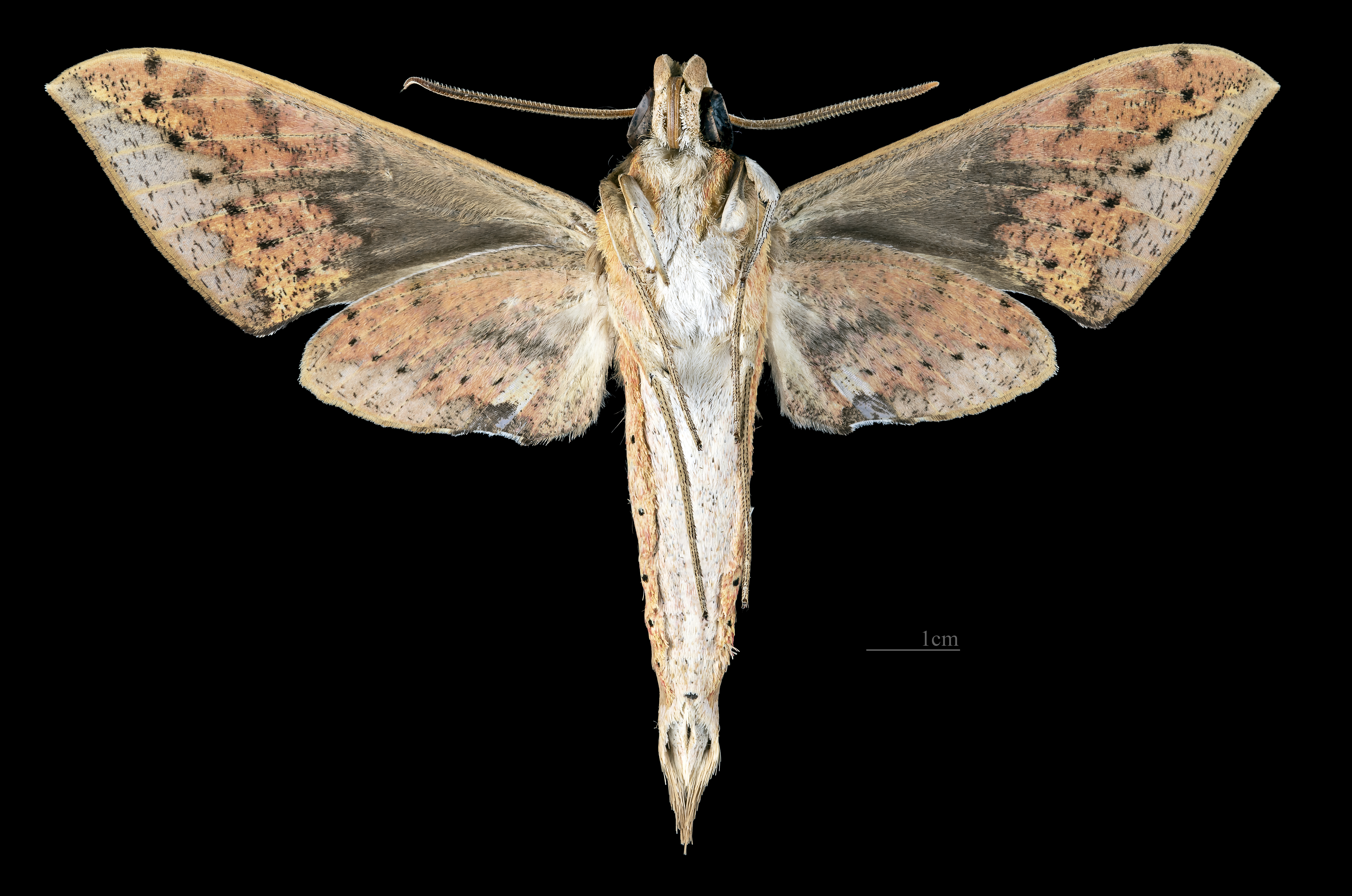
R. c. formosana, ventral view
