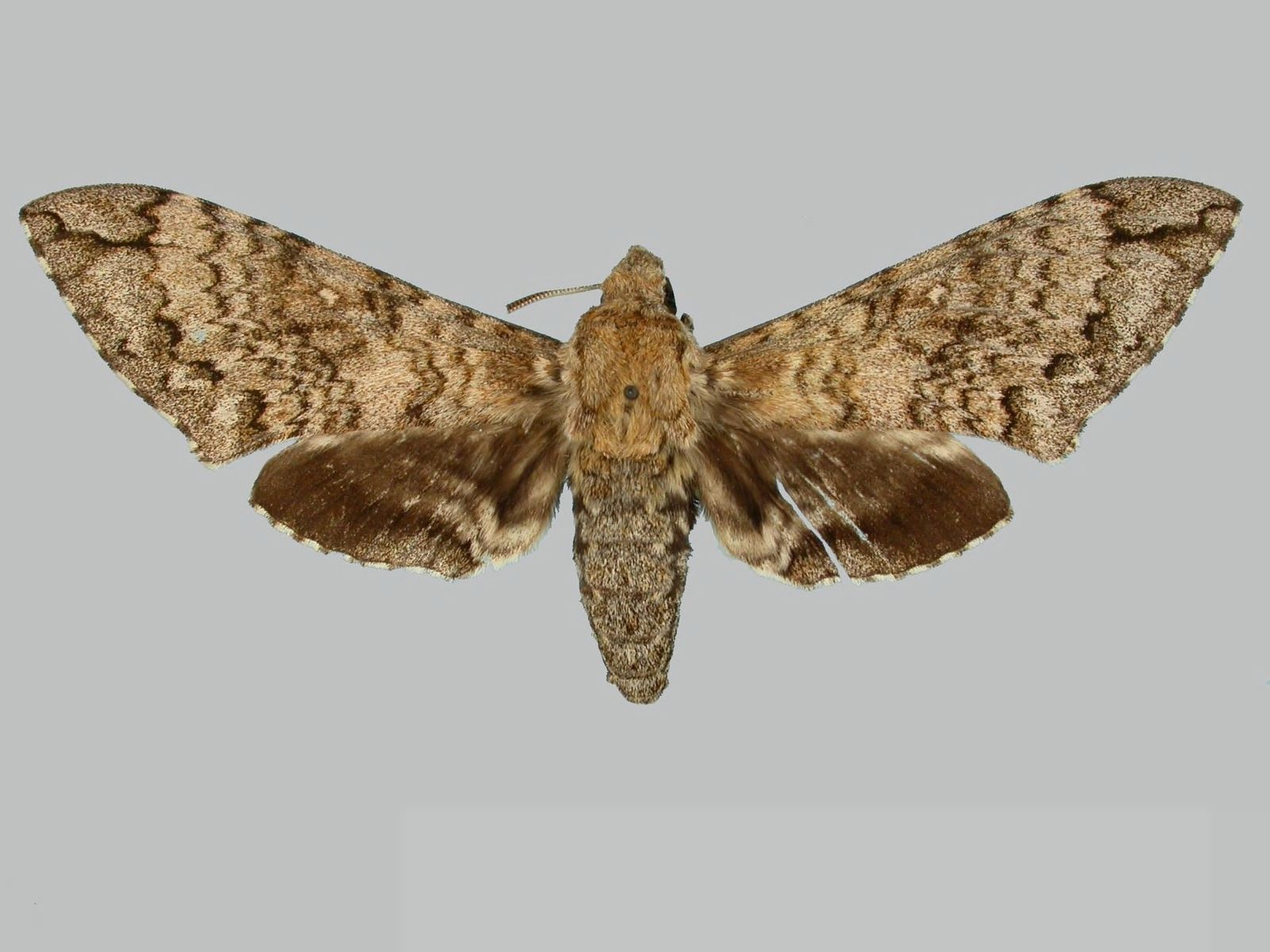
- Male

Scientific classification
- Kingdom: Animalia
- Phylum: Arthropoda
- Class: Insecta
- Order: Lepidoptera
- Family: Sphingidae
- Genus: Manduca
- Species: M. bergarmatipes

Binomial name
- Manduca bergarmatipes (B.P. Clark, 1927)

Synonyms
- Protoparce bergarmatipes Clark, 1927

= Manduca bergarmatipes =

Species of moth

Manduca bergarmatipes is a moth of the family Sphingidae. It is found in Argentina and Uruguay.

Adults are on wing in November.
