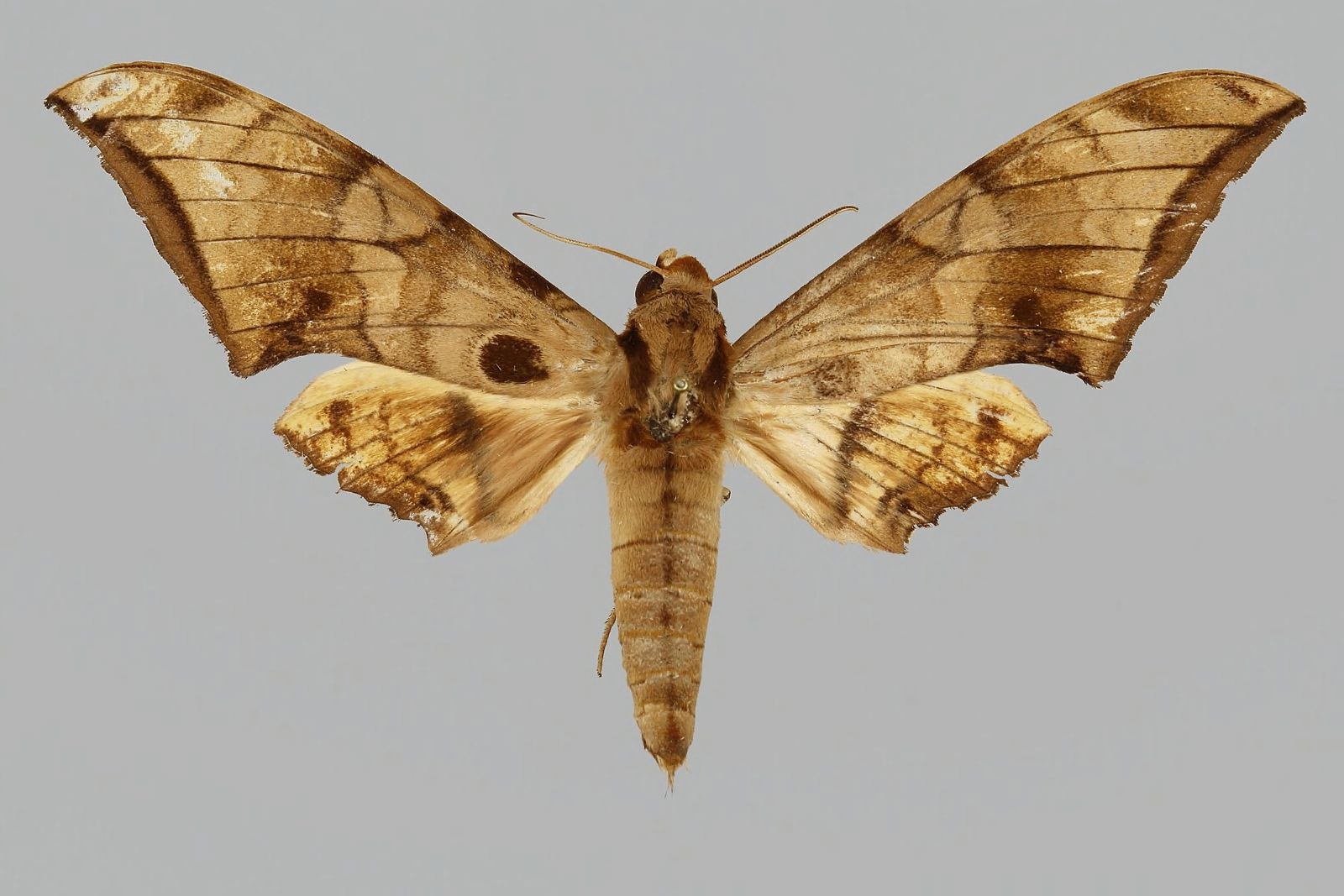
- Male

Scientific classification
- Kingdom: Animalia
- Phylum: Arthropoda
- Class: Insecta
- Order: Lepidoptera
- Family: Sphingidae
- Genus: Ambulyx
- Species: A. tondanoi

Binomial name
- Ambulyx tondanoi (Clark, 1930)

Synonyms
- Oxyambulyx tondanoi Clark, 1930

= Ambulyx tondanoi =

Species of moth

Ambulyx tondanoi is a species of moth of the family Sphingidae. It is known from Sulawesi.
