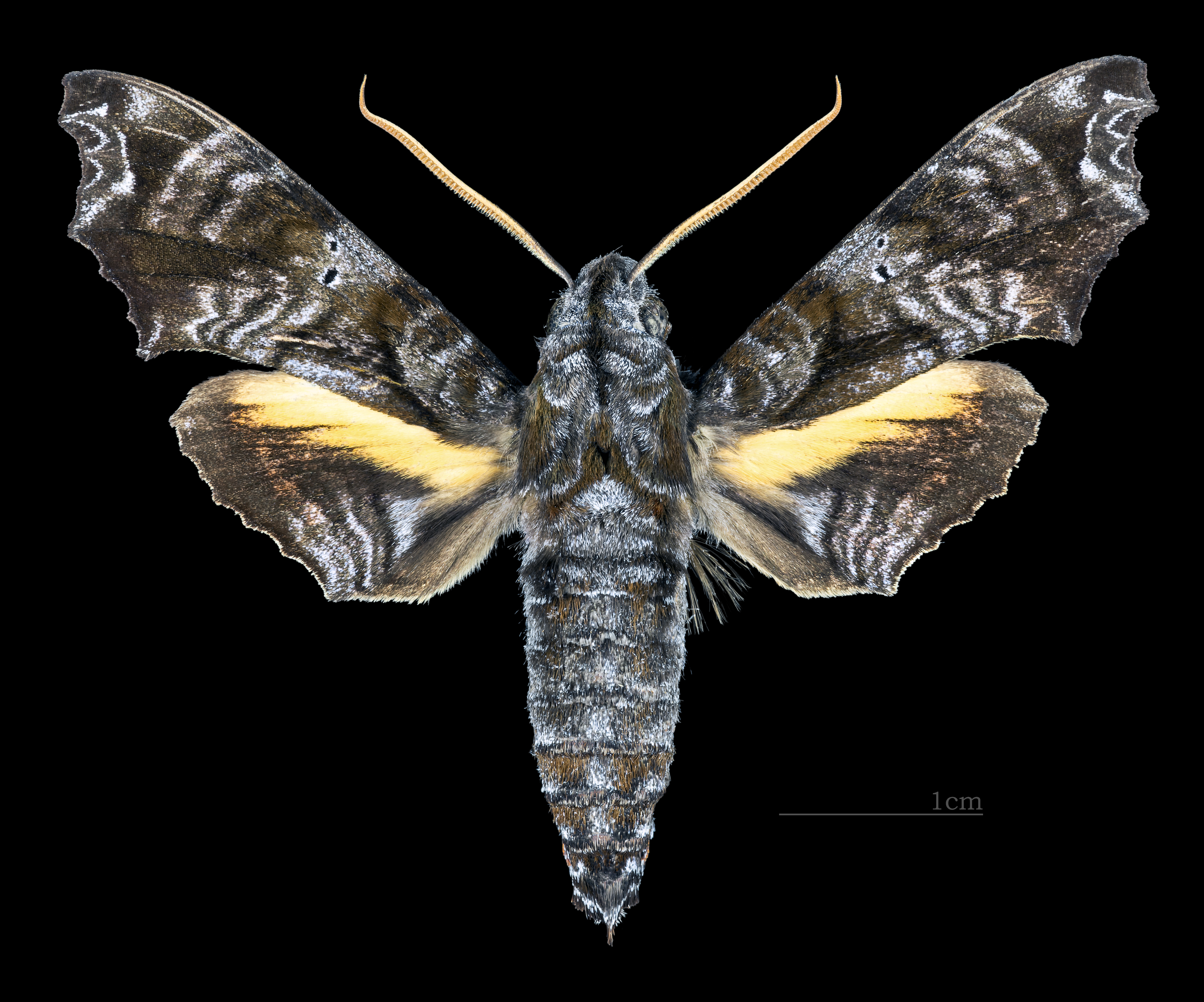
- Dorsal male
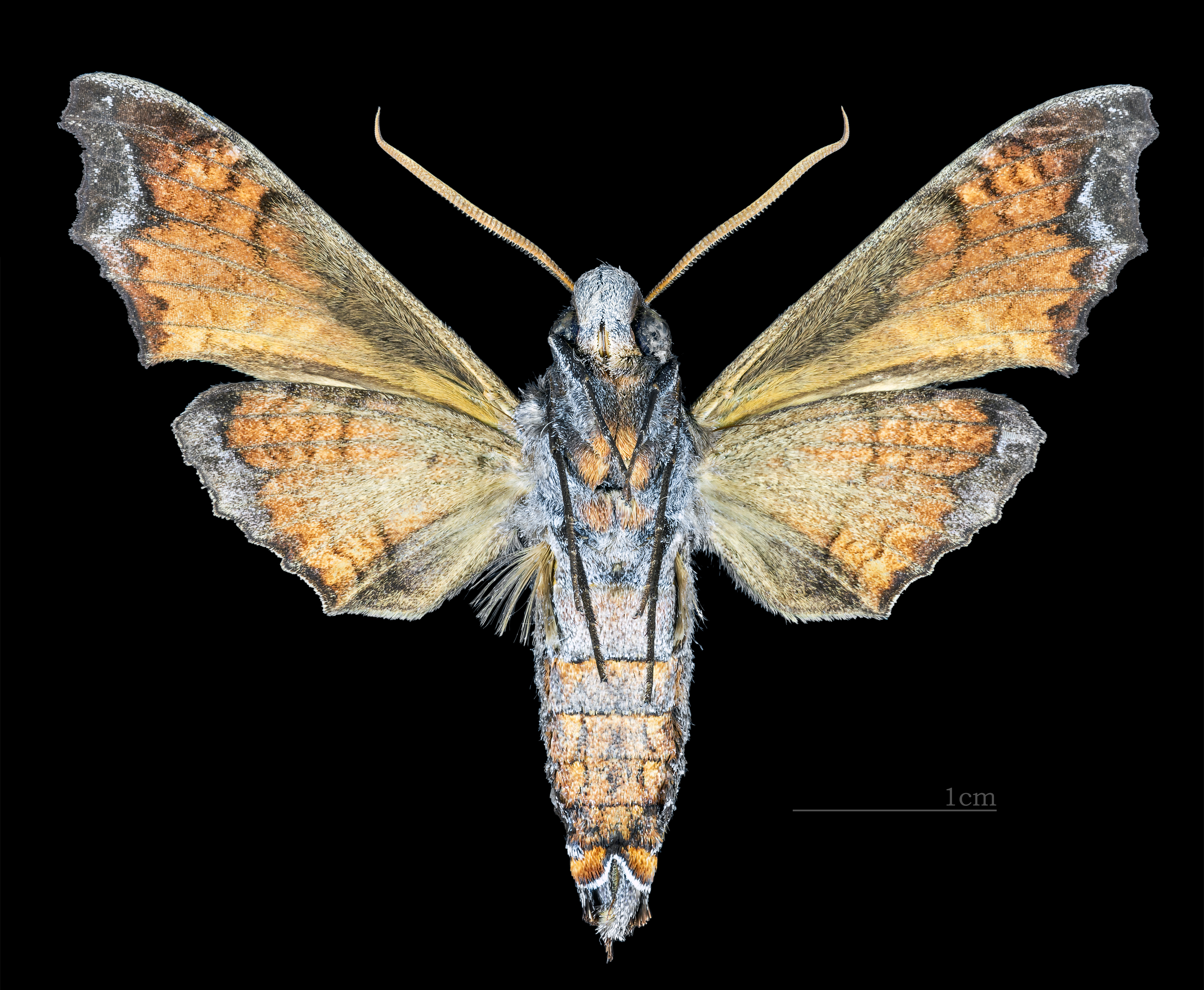
- Ventral male

Scientific classification
- Domain: Eukaryota
- Kingdom: Animalia
- Phylum: Arthropoda
- Class: Insecta
- Order: Lepidoptera
- Family: Sphingidae
- Genus: Nyceryx
- Species: N. eximia

Binomial name
- Nyceryx eximia Rothschild & Jordan, 1916

Synonyms
- Nyceryx mulleri Clark, 1917

= Nyceryx eximia =

Species of moth

Nyceryx eximia is a moth of the family Sphingidae. It is known from Panama, Costa Rica, Guatemala and Mexico, as well as Ecuador.

The length of the forewings is 22-27.5 mm. It is similar to Nyceryx tacita but can be distinguished by the more extensive basal yellow area of the hindwing upperside and details of the pattern of the forewing upperside (it is more purplish-brown and the whitish grey lines are more irregular in shape). Furthermore, the whitish lateral spots on underside of the abdomen are larger.

Adults are probably on wing year round.

== Subspecies ==
- Nyceryx eximia eximia (Panama, Costa Rica, Guatemala and Mexico)
- Nyceryx eximia occidentalis Cadiou & Haxaire, 1997 (Ecuador)
