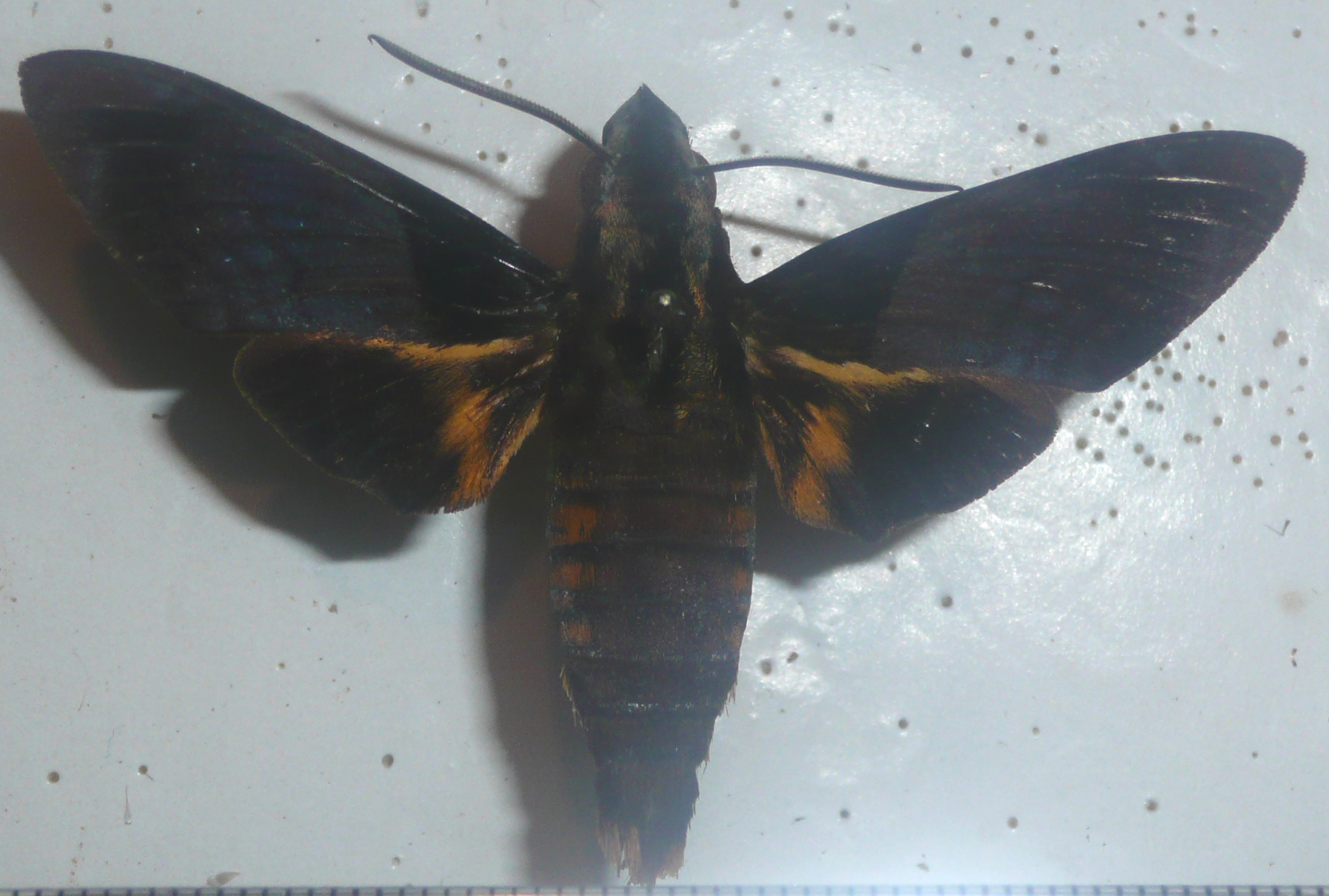

Scientific classification
- Kingdom: Animalia
- Phylum: Arthropoda
- Class: Insecta
- Order: Lepidoptera
- Family: Sphingidae
- Genus: Macroglossum
- Species: M. albolineata

Binomial name
- Macroglossum albolineata Clark, 1935

= Macroglossum albolineata =

Species of moth

Macroglossum albolineata is a moth of the family Sphingidae. It was described by Benjamin Preston Clark in 1935 and is known from Papua New Guinea.
