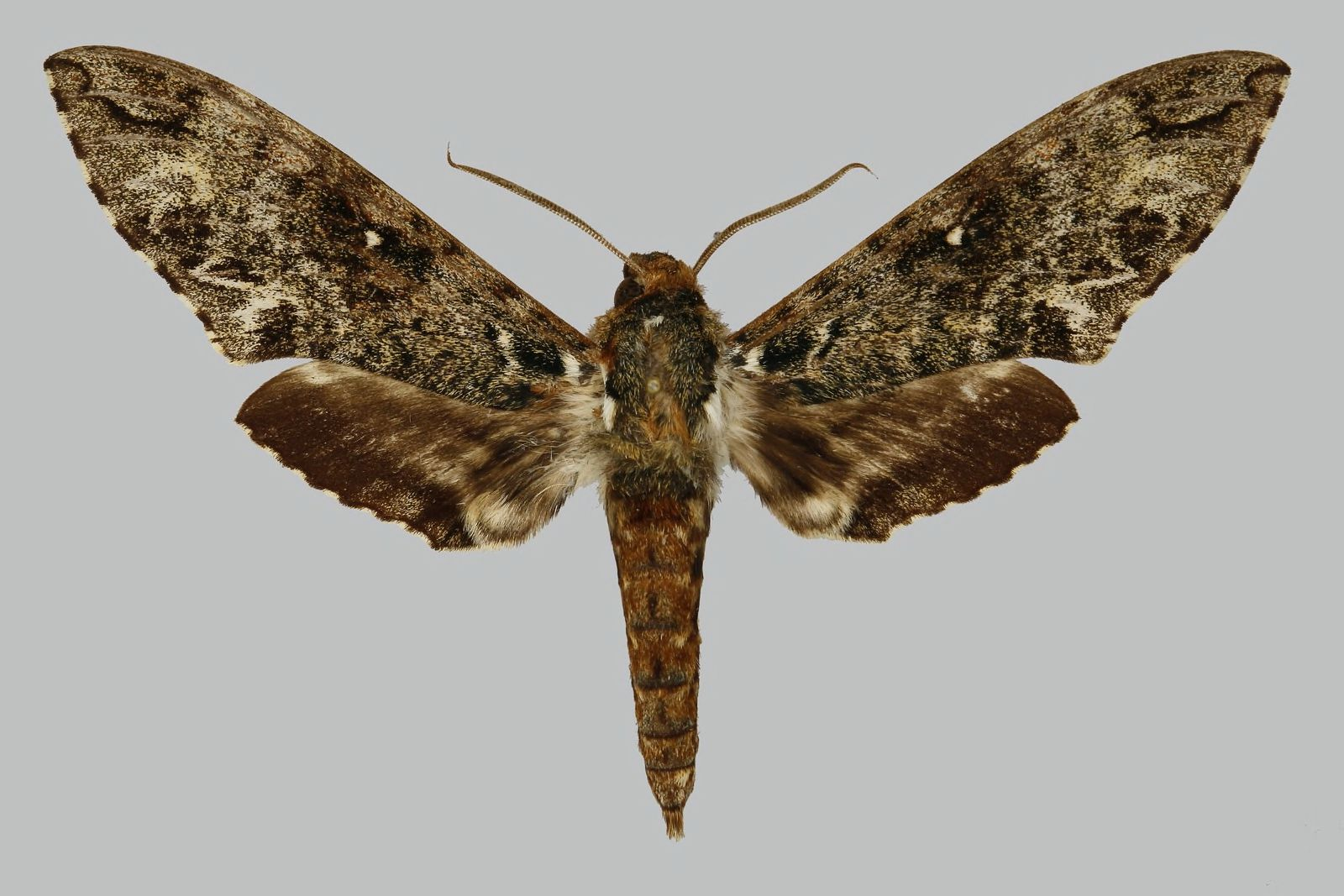

Scientific classification
- Kingdom: Animalia
- Phylum: Arthropoda
- Class: Insecta
- Order: Lepidoptera
- Family: Sphingidae
- Genus: Manduca
- Species: M. gueneei

Binomial name
- Manduca gueneei (B.P Clark, 1932)

Synonyms
- Chlaenogramma gueneei Clark, 1932

= Manduca gueneei =

Species of moth

Manduca gueneei is a moth of the family Sphingidae. It is known from Brazil.
