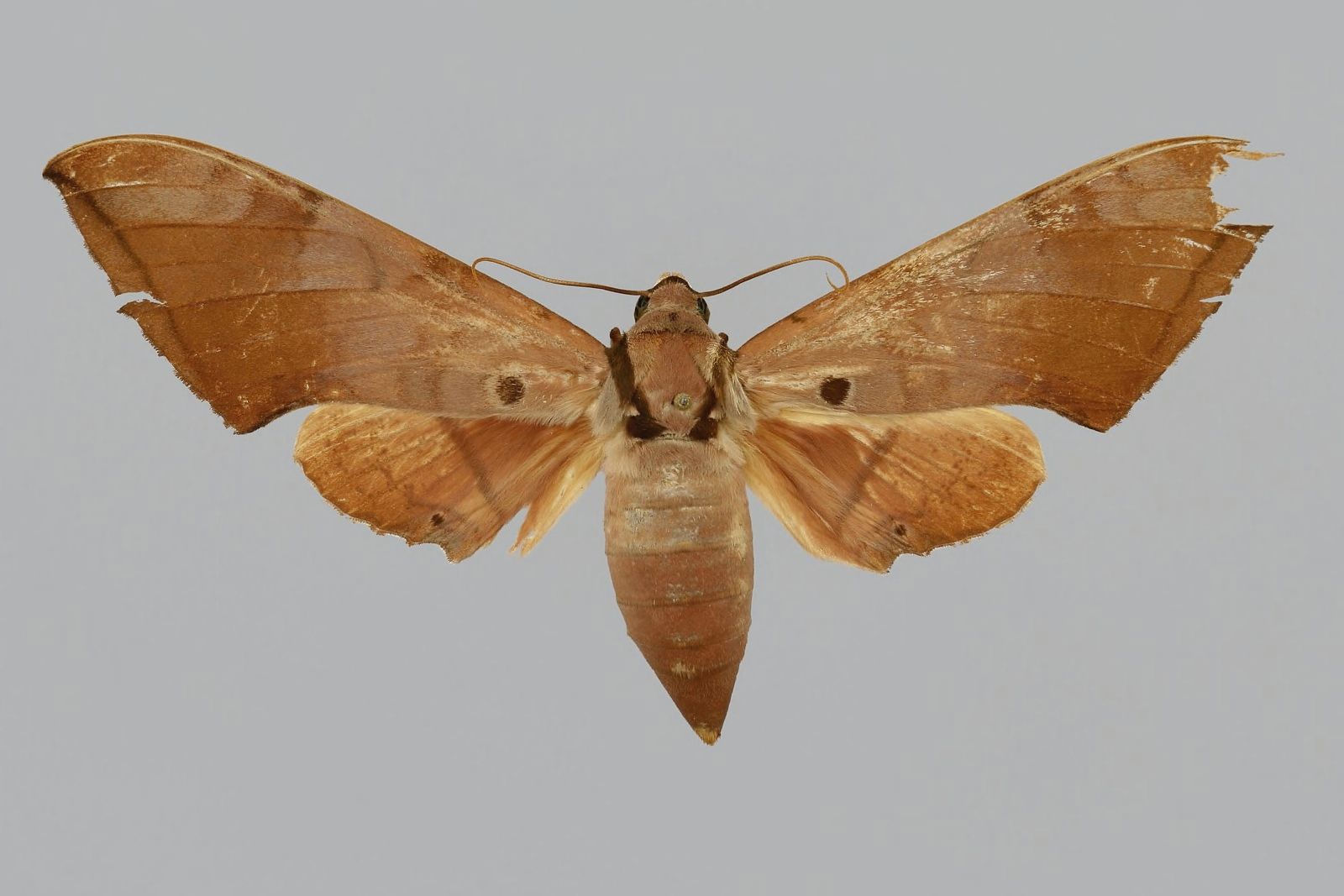
- Female

Scientific classification
- Kingdom: Animalia
- Phylum: Arthropoda
- Class: Insecta
- Order: Lepidoptera
- Family: Sphingidae
- Genus: Ambulyx
- Species: A. charlesi

Binomial name
- Ambulyx charlesi (Clark, 1924)

Synonyms
- Oxyambulyx charlesi Clark, 1924

= Ambulyx charlesi =

Species of moth

Ambulyx charlesi is a species of moth in the family Sphingidae. It was described by Benjamin Preston Clark in 1924 and is known from Indonesia.
