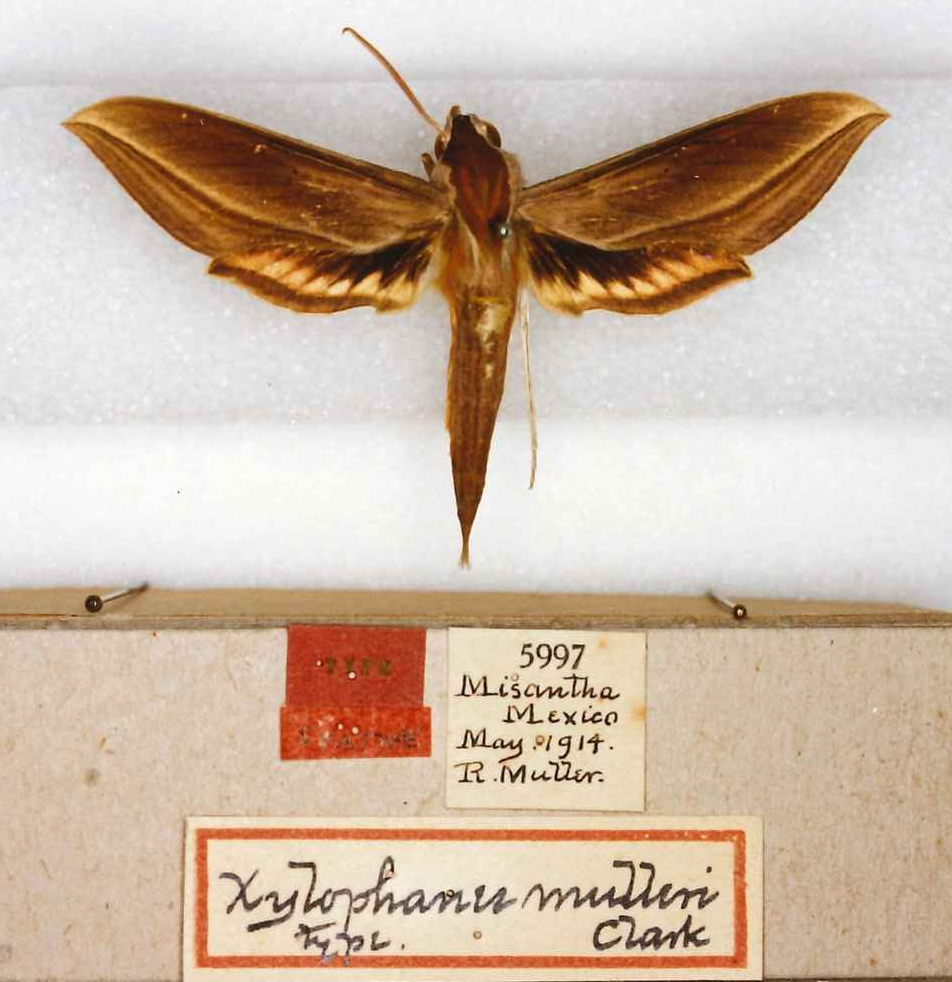

Scientific classification
- Domain: Eukaryota
- Kingdom: Animalia
- Phylum: Arthropoda
- Class: Insecta
- Order: Lepidoptera
- Family: Sphingidae
- Genus: Xylophanes
- Species: X. mulleri

Binomial name
- Xylophanes mulleri Clark, 1920

= Xylophanes mulleri =

Species of moth

Xylophanes mulleri is a moth of the family Sphingidae. It is known from Mexico.

The length of the forewings is about 33 mm. The forewing upperside is uniform brown and separated from a well-developed brown fourth postmedian line by a strongly contrasting pale yellow line running from the inner margin to the apex. The fifth postmedian line and two submarginal lines are brown and conspicuous against a paler brown ground.

Adults are probably on wing year-round.

The larvae probably feed on Rubiaceae and Malvaceae species.
