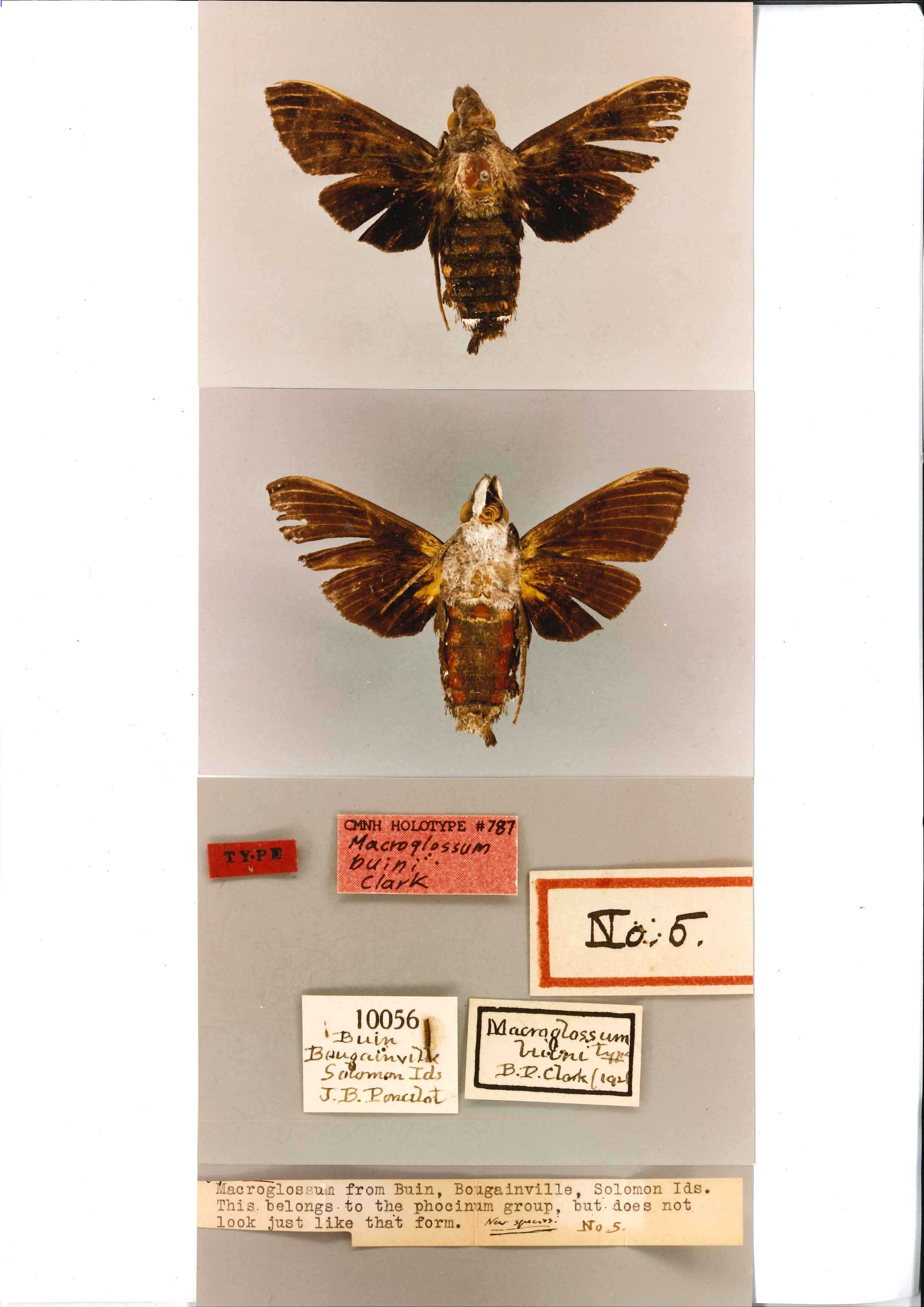
- Holotype specimen

Scientific classification
- Kingdom: Animalia
- Phylum: Arthropoda
- Class: Insecta
- Order: Lepidoptera
- Family: Sphingidae
- Genus: Macroglossum
- Species: M. buini

Binomial name
- Macroglossum buini Clark, 1926

= Macroglossum buini =

Species of moth

Macroglossum buini is a moth of the family Sphingidae. It is known from Bougainville Island.

The length of the forewings is about 20 mm. It is a member of the uniformly dark Macroglossum species group, but is smaller and shorter-winged than the other species in this group. The upperside of the hindwing, thorax and abdomen are largely black. The forewing upperside and underside, as well as the hindwing underside are largely dark brown. The forewing underside has an irregular bright yellow basal area extending about 3 mm from the base.
