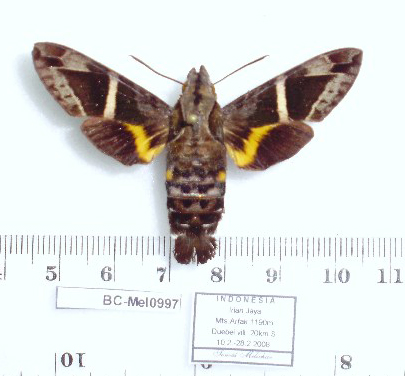

Scientific classification
- Kingdom: Animalia
- Phylum: Arthropoda
- Class: Insecta
- Order: Lepidoptera
- Family: Sphingidae
- Genus: Macroglossum
- Species: M. stevensi

Binomial name
- Macroglossum stevensi Clark, 1935

= Macroglossum stevensi =

Species of moth

Macroglossum stevensi is a moth of the family Sphingidae. It is known from Papua New Guinea.
