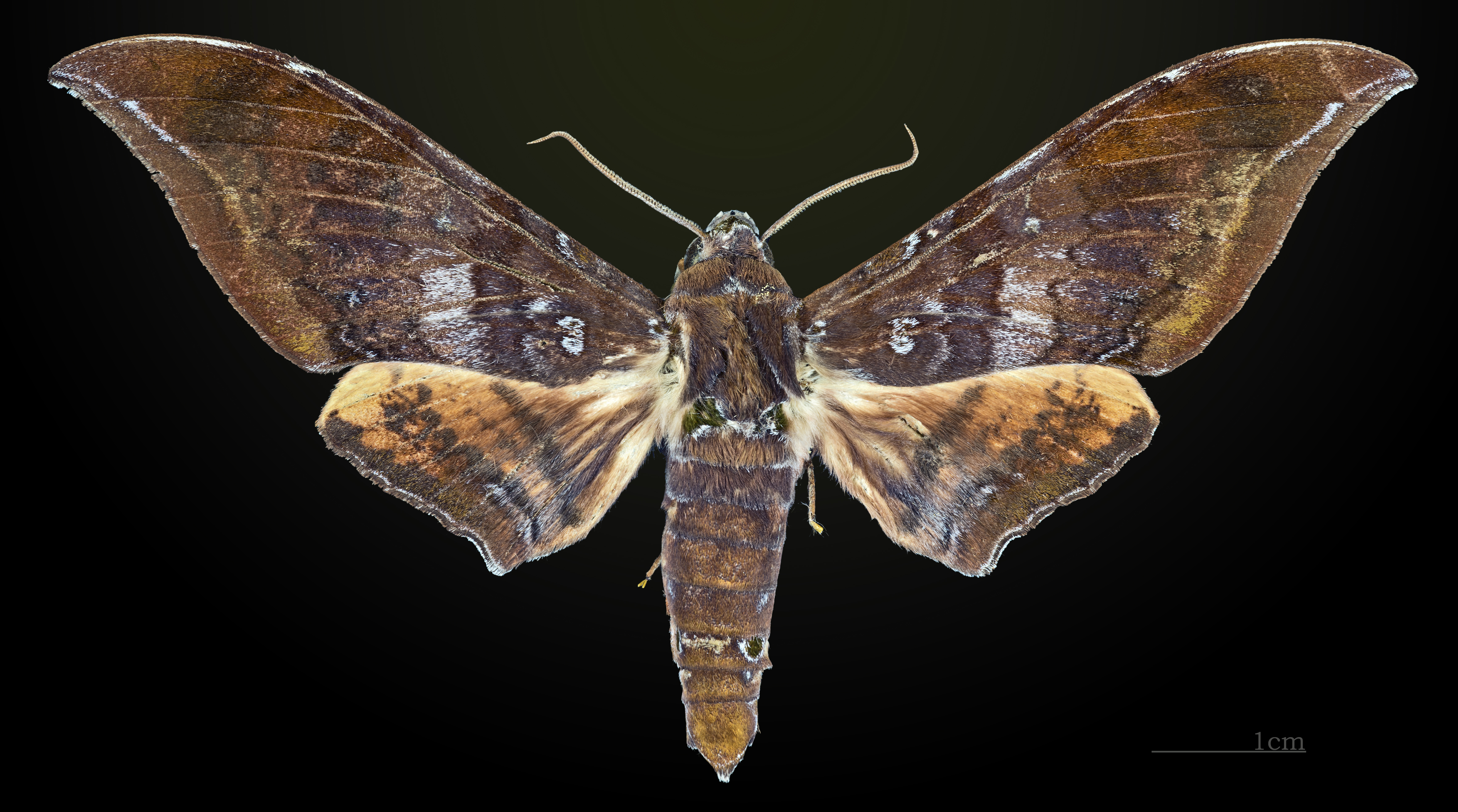
- Dorsal view
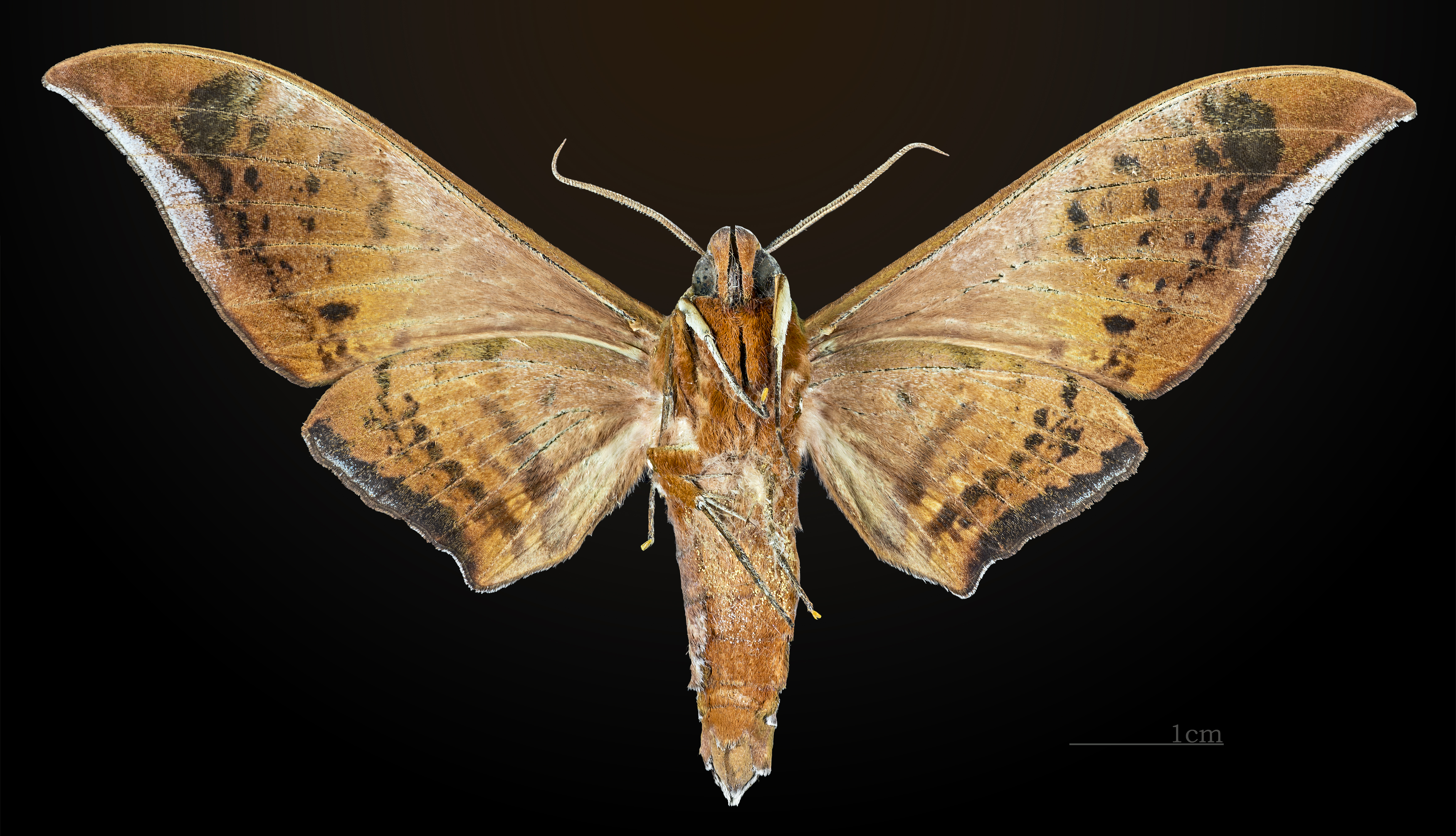
- Ventral view

Scientific classification
- Kingdom: Animalia
- Phylum: Arthropoda
- Class: Insecta
- Order: Lepidoptera
- Family: Sphingidae
- Genus: Ambulyx
- Species: A. bakeri

Binomial name
- Ambulyx bakeri (Clark, 1929)

Synonyms
- Oxyambulyx bakeri Clark, 1929

= Ambulyx bakeri =

Species of moth

Mj bakeri is a species of moth in the family Sphingidae. It was described by Benjamin Preston Clark in 1929 and is known from the Philippines.
