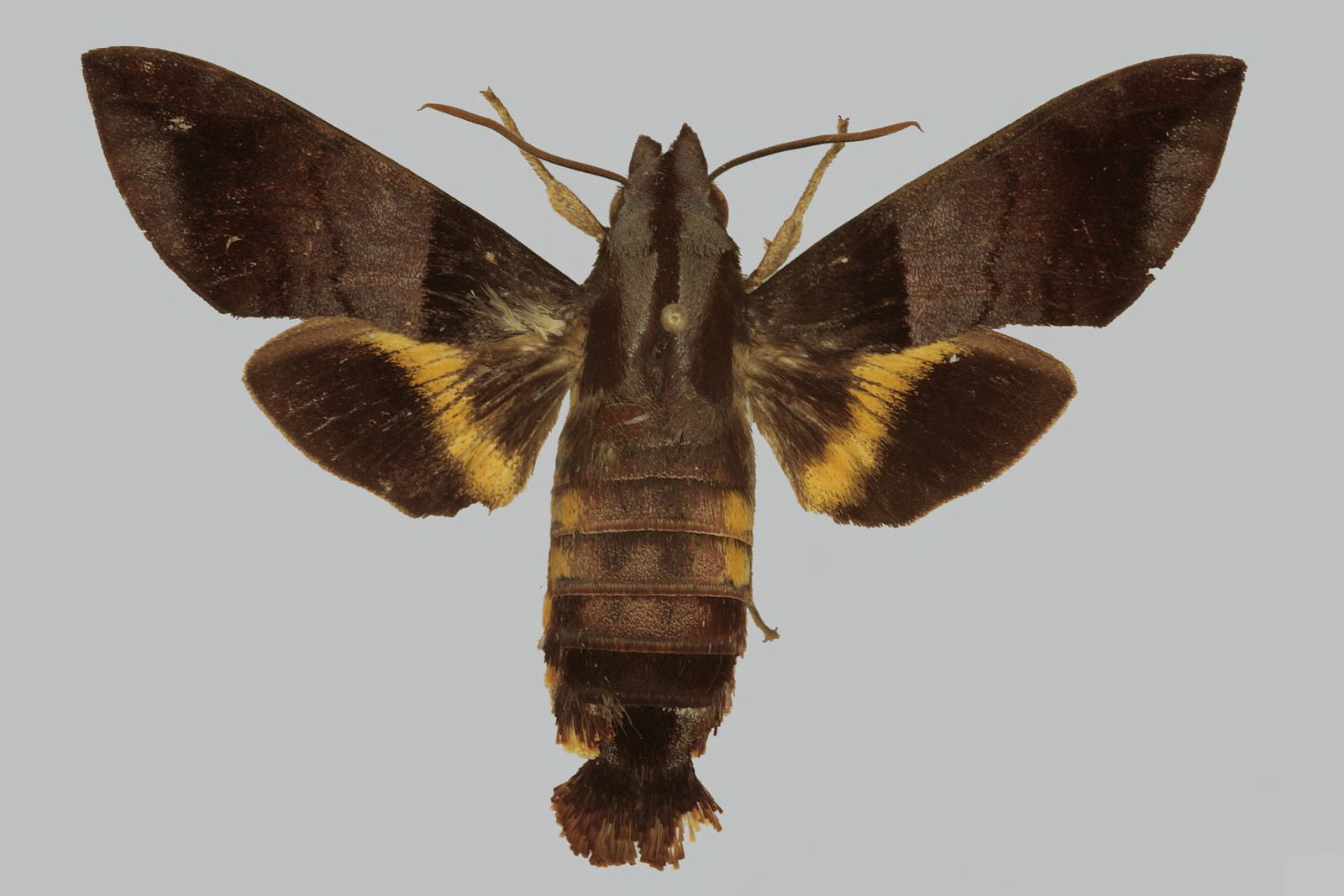

Scientific classification
- Kingdom: Animalia
- Phylum: Arthropoda
- Class: Insecta
- Order: Lepidoptera
- Family: Sphingidae
- Genus: Macroglossum
- Species: M. haslami

Binomial name
- Macroglossum haslami Clark, 1922

= Macroglossum haslami =

Species of moth

Macroglossum haslami is a moth of the family Sphingidae. It is known from the Philippines.
