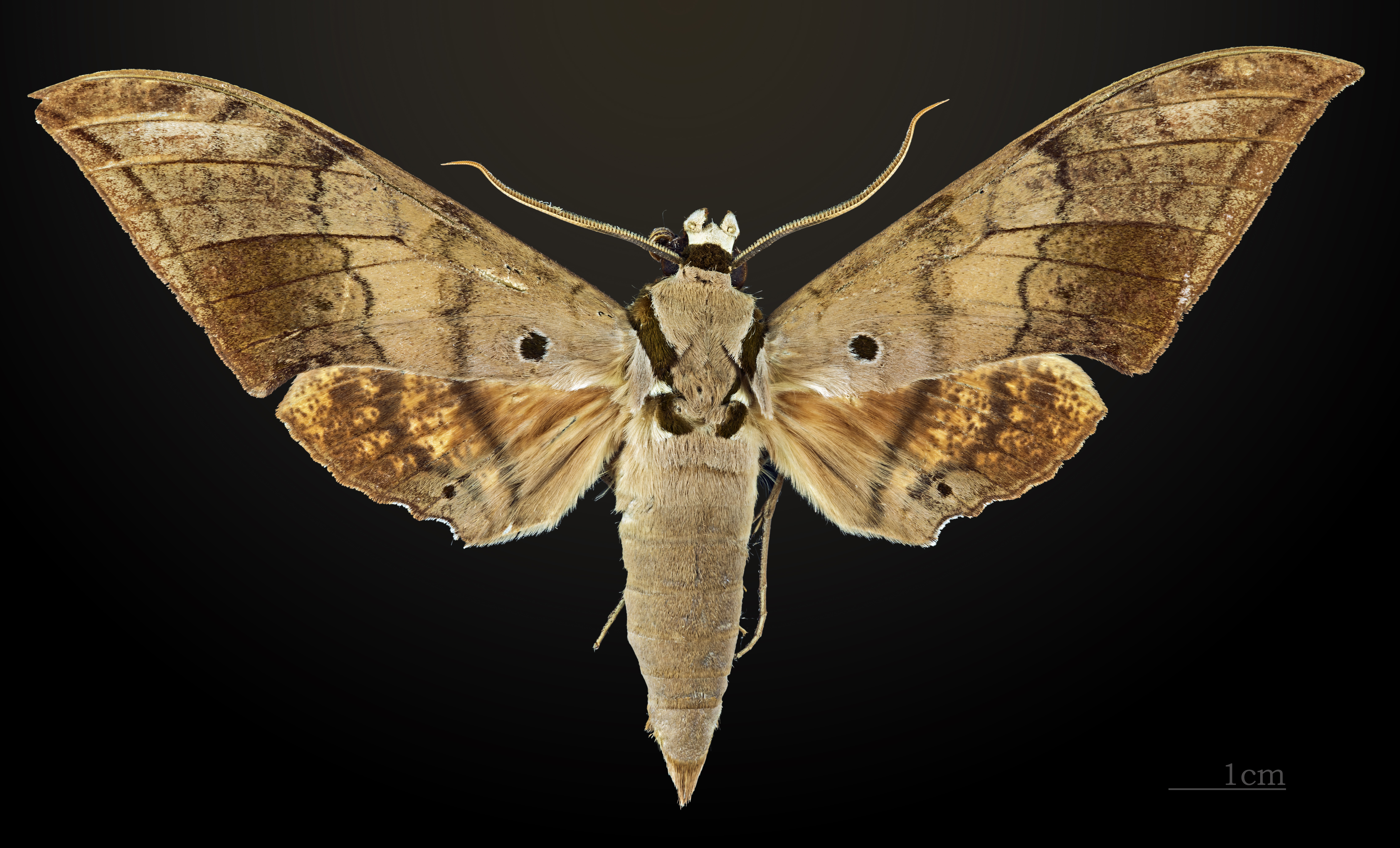
- Dorsal
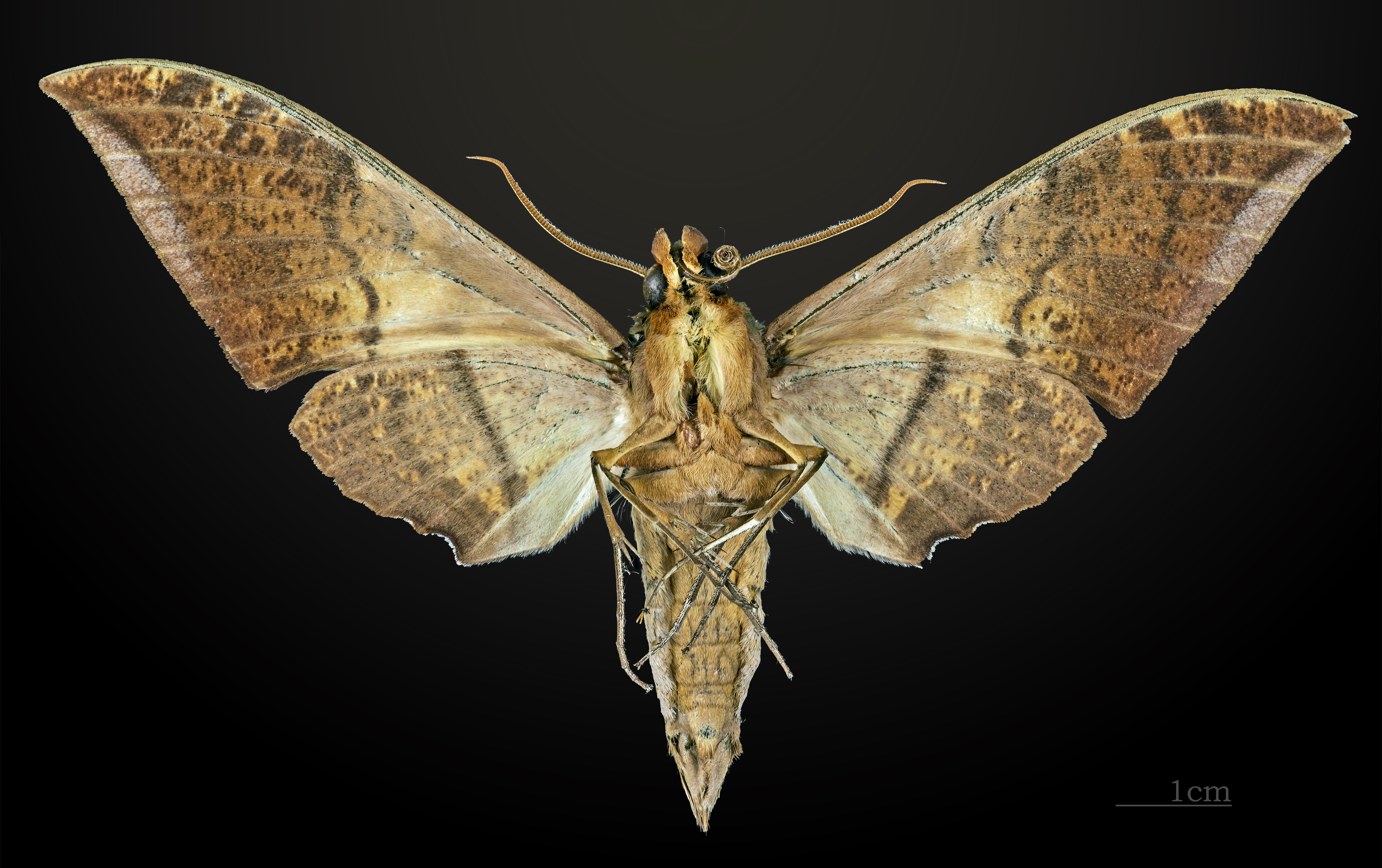
- ventral

Scientific classification
- Kingdom: Animalia
- Phylum: Arthropoda
- Class: Insecta
- Order: Lepidoptera
- Family: Sphingidae
- Genus: Ambulyx
- Species: A. tenimberi

Binomial name
- Ambulyx tenimberi (Clark, 1929)

Synonyms
- Oxyambulyx tenimberi Clark, 1929

= Ambulyx tenimberi =

Species of moth

Ambulyx tenimberi is a species of moth of the family Sphingidae. It is known from Sulawesi.
