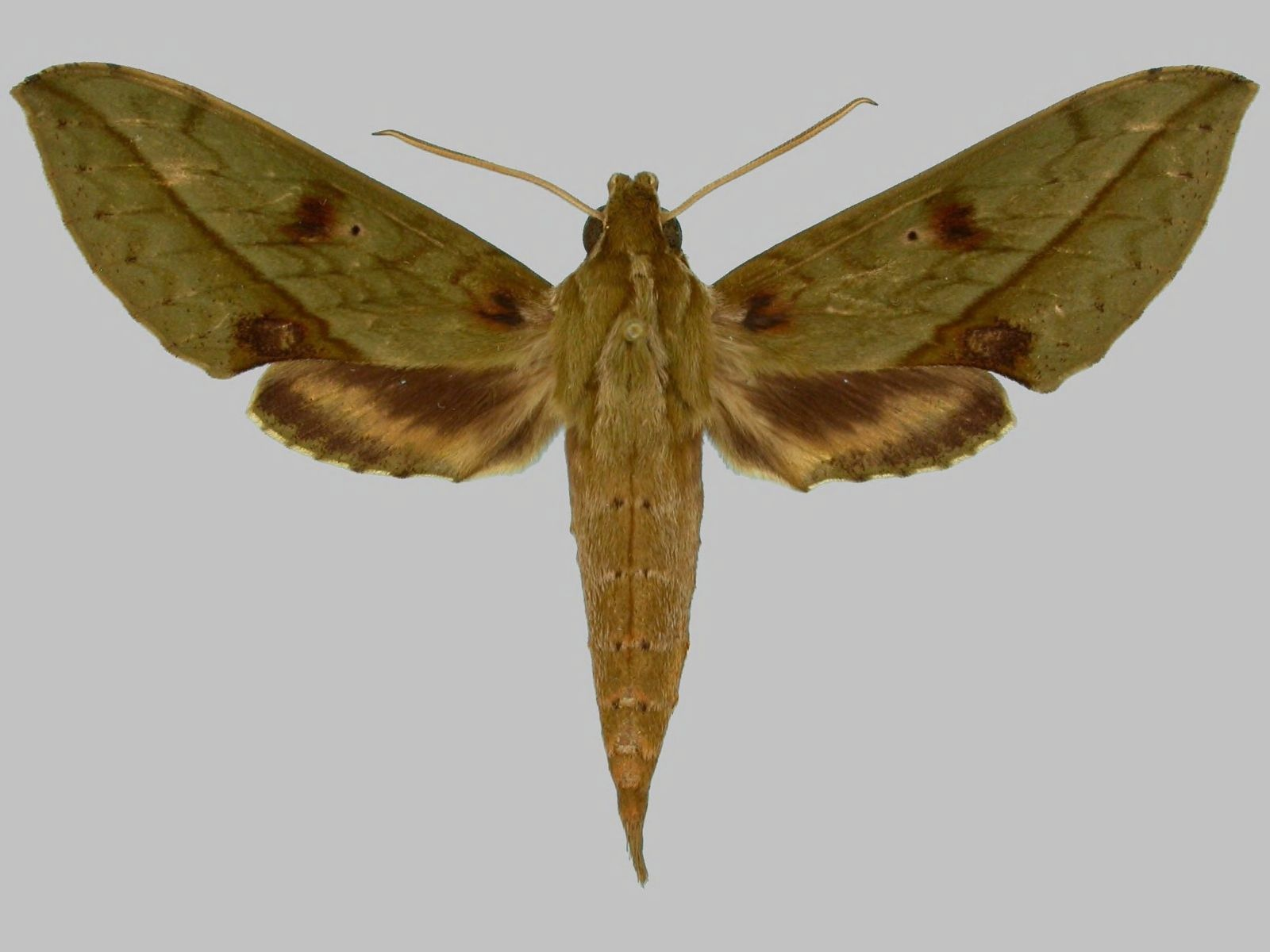

Scientific classification
- Domain: Eukaryota
- Kingdom: Animalia
- Phylum: Arthropoda
- Class: Insecta
- Order: Lepidoptera
- Family: Sphingidae
- Genus: Xylophanes
- Species: X. macasensis

Binomial name
- Xylophanes macasensis Clark, 1922

= Xylophanes macasensis =

Species of moth

Xylophanes macasensis is a moth of the family Sphingidae first described by Benjamin Preston Clark in 1922. It is found from Ecuador south into Bolivia.

The wingspan is about 80 mm for both males and females.

Adults are probably on wing year round. Adults have been reported in December.

The larvae probably feed on Rubiaceae and Malvaceae species.
