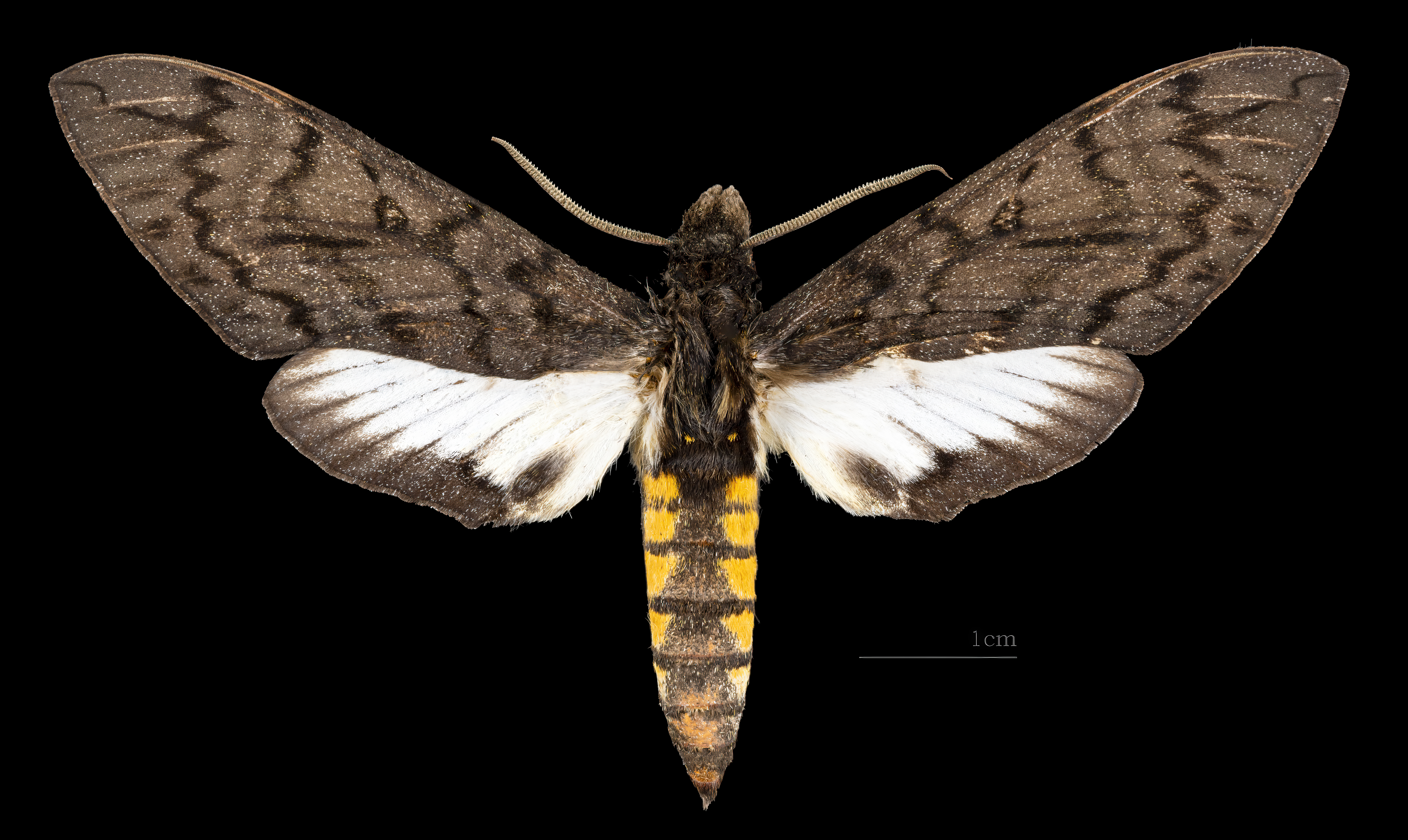
- Male dorsal
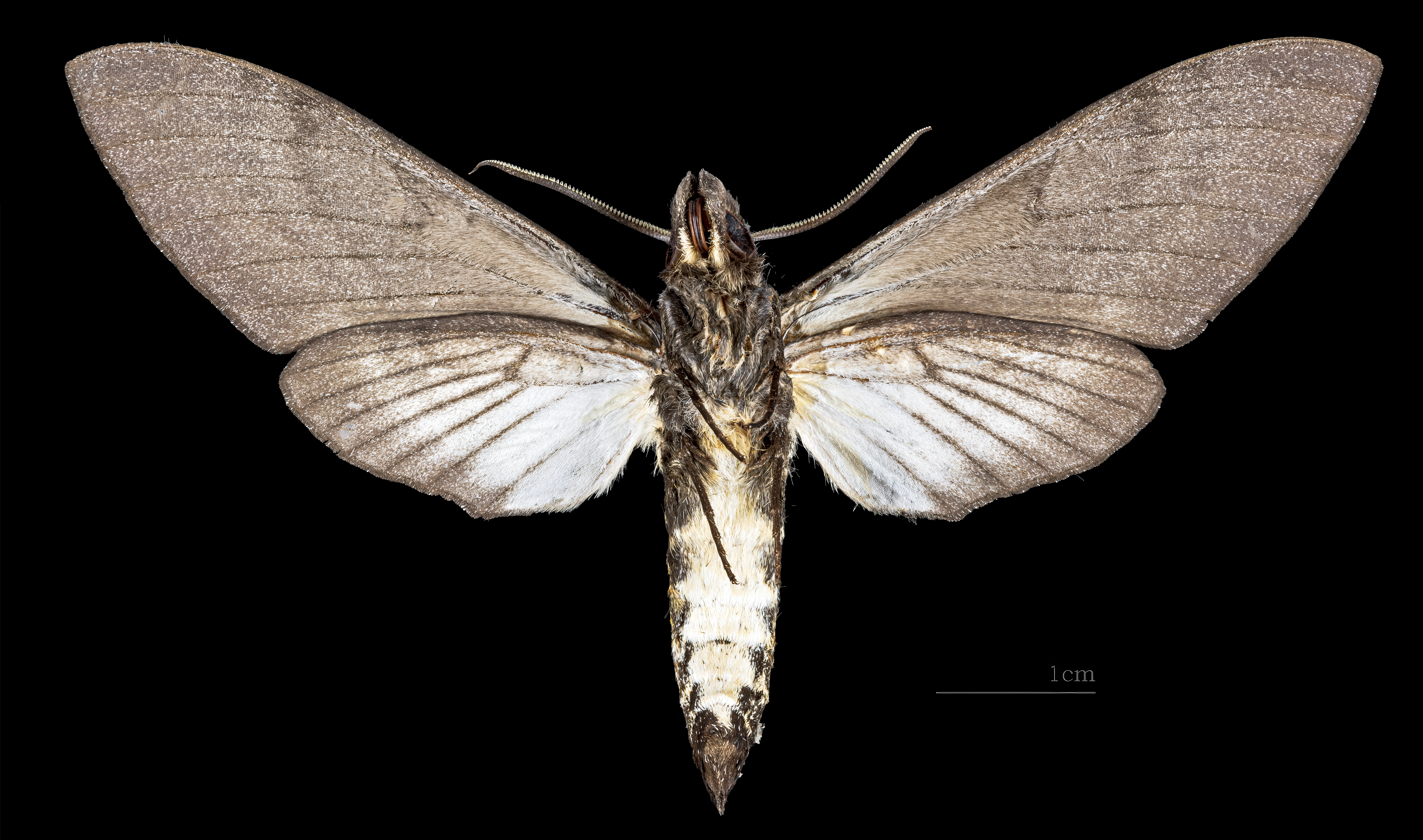
- Male ventral

Scientific classification
- Kingdom: Animalia
- Phylum: Arthropoda
- Class: Insecta
- Order: Lepidoptera
- Family: Sphingidae
- Genus: Manduca
- Species: M. violaalba

Binomial name
- Manduca violaalba (B. P. Clark, 1922)

Synonyms
- Protoparce violaalba Clark, 1922

= Manduca violaalba =

Species of moth

Manduca violaalba is a moth of the family Sphingidae first described by Benjamin Preston Clark in 1922.

== Distribution ==
It is known from Brazil.

== Description ==
The length of the forewings is about 39 mm. It is a unique species in the genus Manduca because of its much darker forewings, also contrasted by its whitish hindwings.

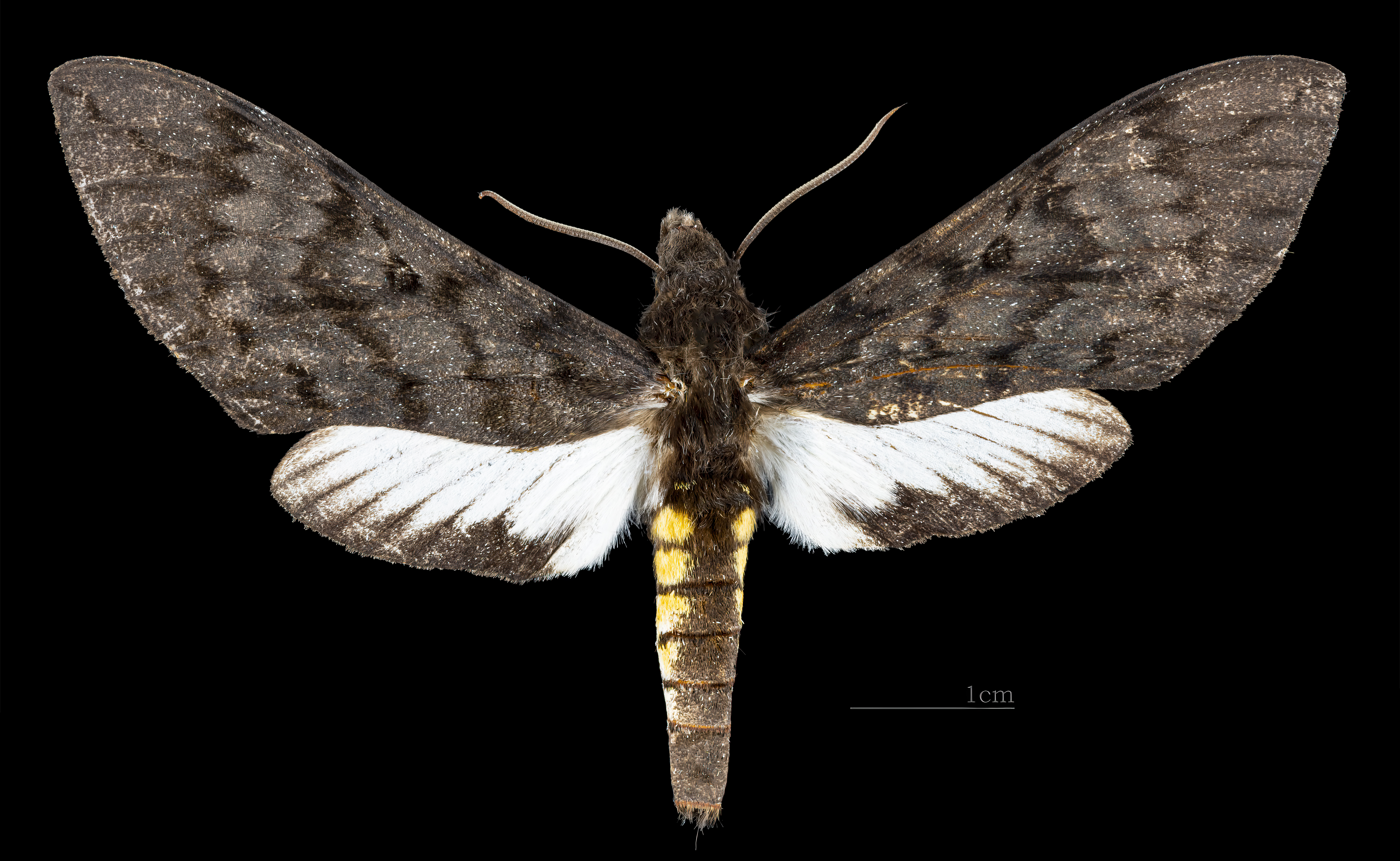
Female Dorsal side

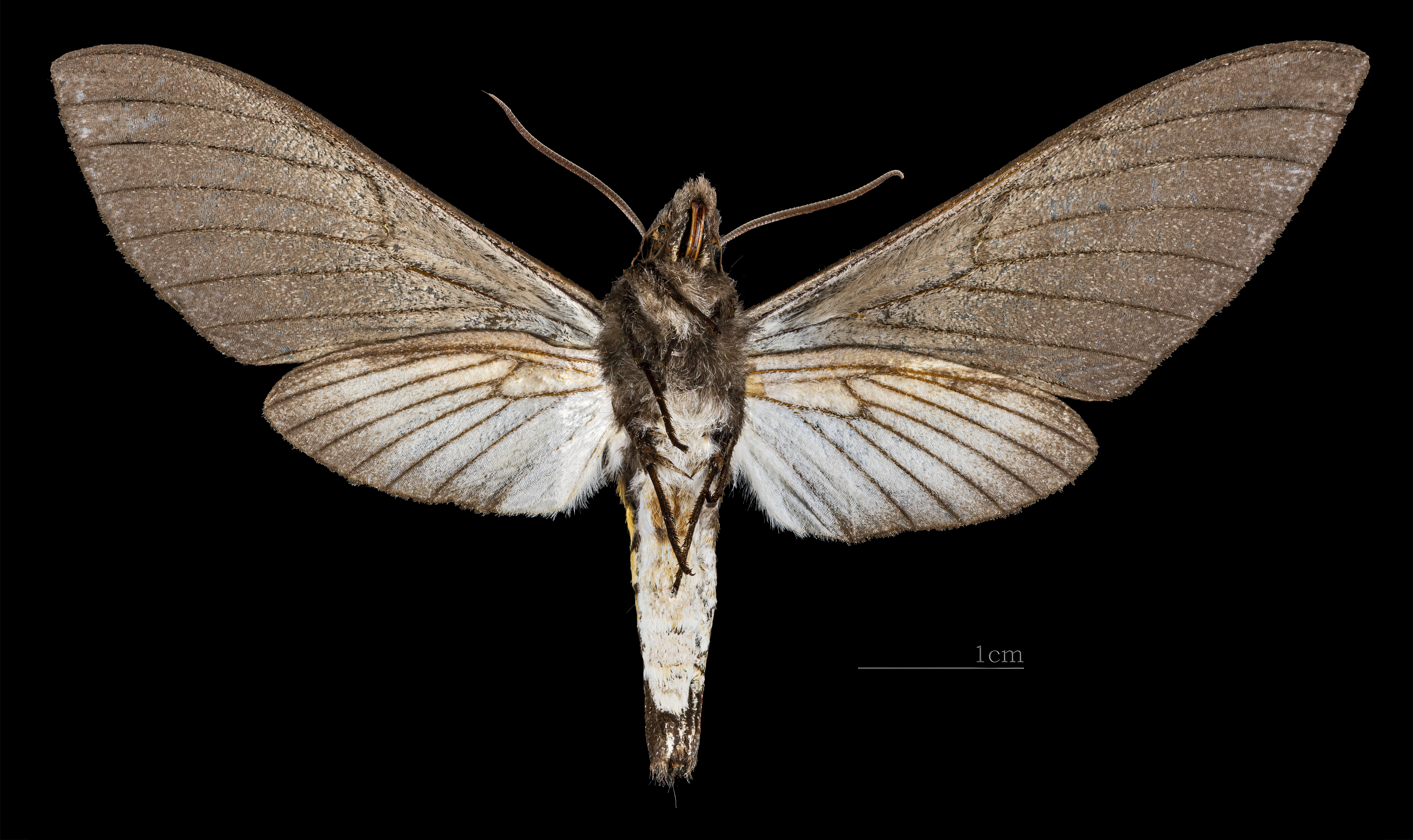
Female △ Ventral sides
