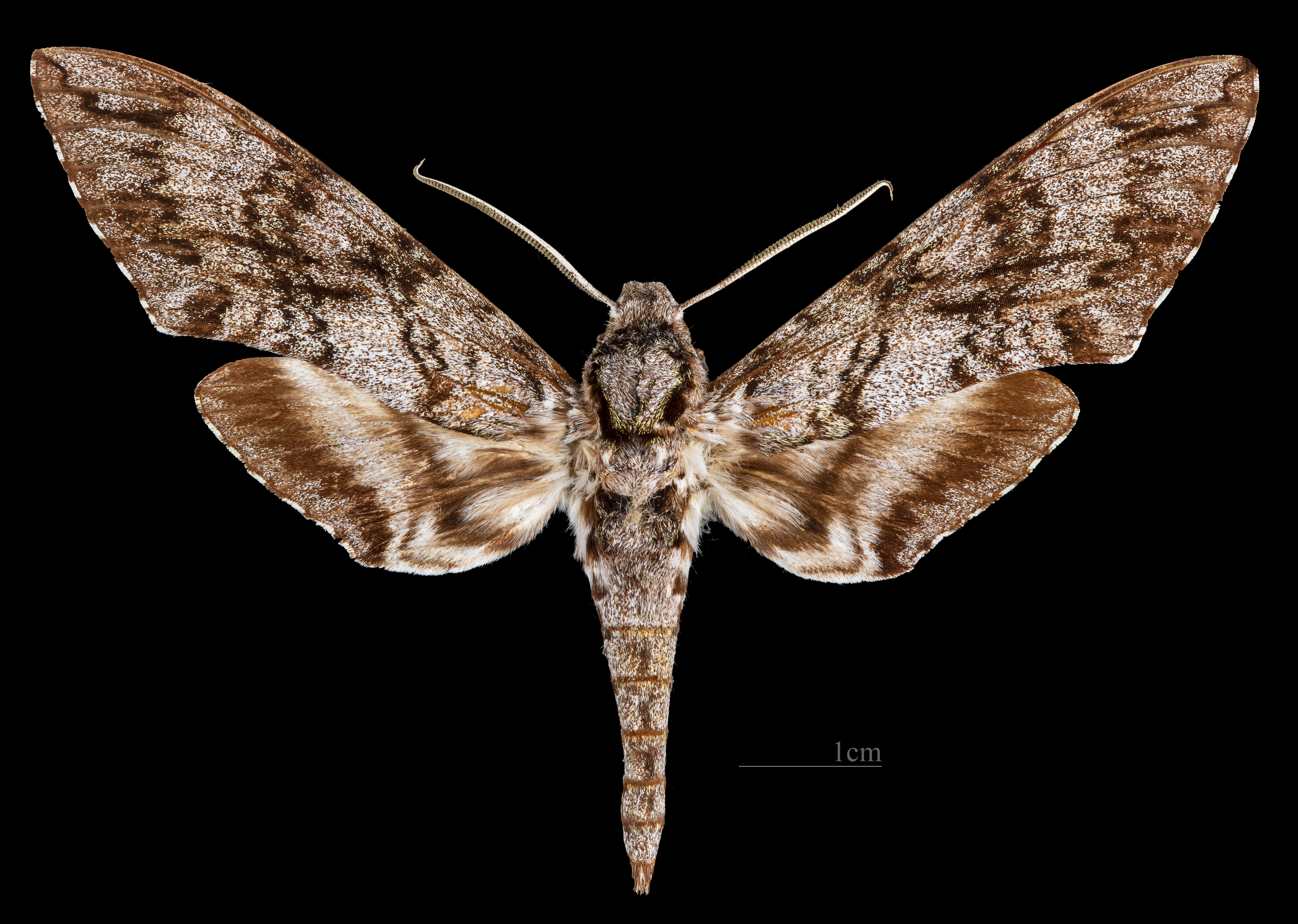
- Manduca corumbensis Male dorsal
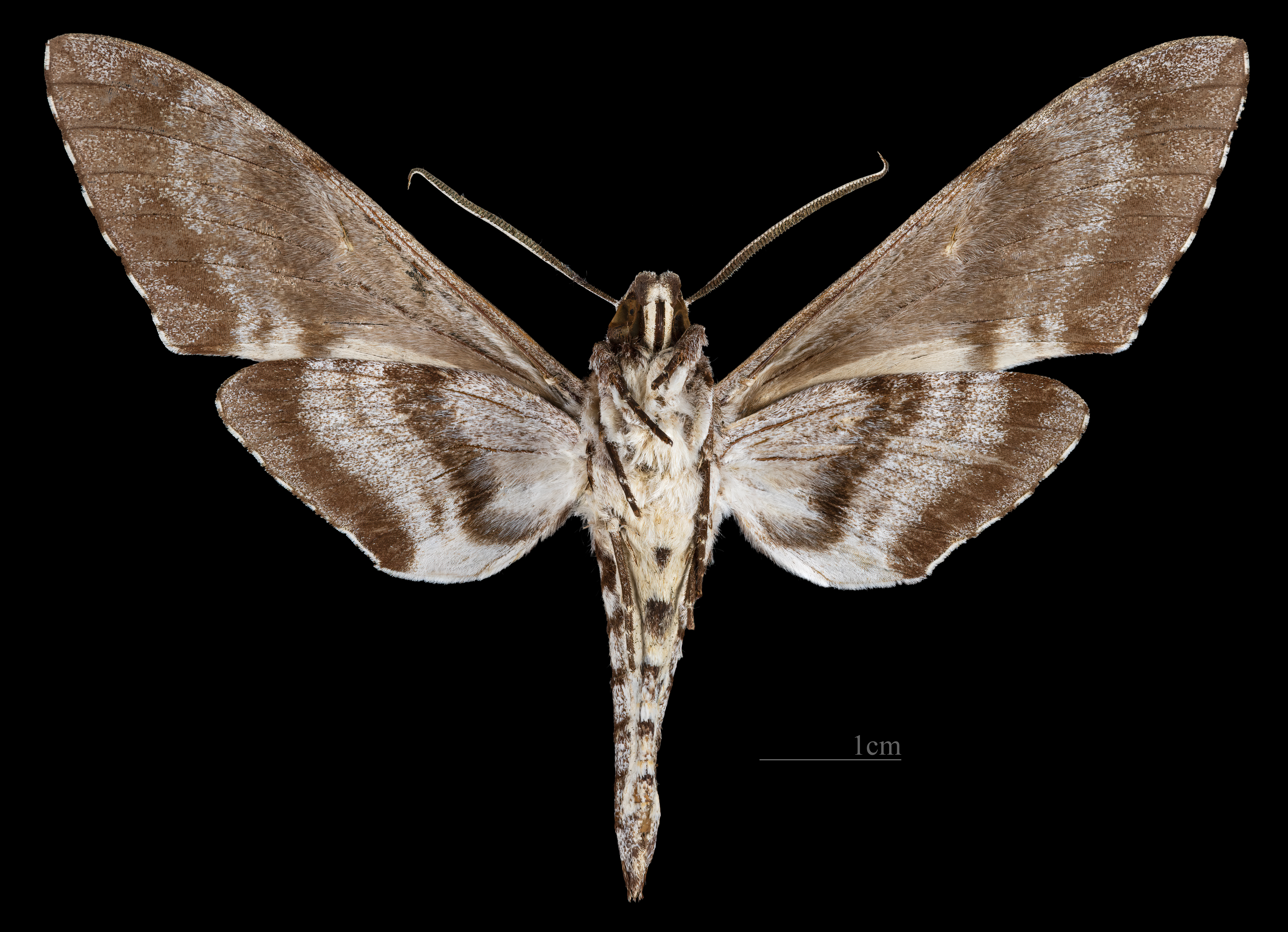
- Manduca corumbensis Male ventral

Scientific classification
- Kingdom: Animalia
- Phylum: Arthropoda
- Class: Insecta
- Order: Lepidoptera
- Family: Sphingidae
- Genus: Manduca
- Species: M. corumbensis

Binomial name
- Manduca corumbensis (B.P. Clark, 1920)

Synonyms
- Chlaenogramma corumbensis Clark, 1920

= Manduca corumbensis =

Species of moth

Manduca corumbensis is a moth of the family Sphingidae.

== Distribution ==
It is known from Bolivia and Brazil.

== Description ==
The length of the forewings is about 56 mm. The antennae are white and brown. The Head, thorax and abdomen uppersides are grey. The wings have both brown and white fringes. The forewing upperside is also mixed white and brown. The basal half of the forewing underside is dark brown, with lighter areas. The hindwing upperside is dirty white bordered by a brown band basally, but otherwise grey.

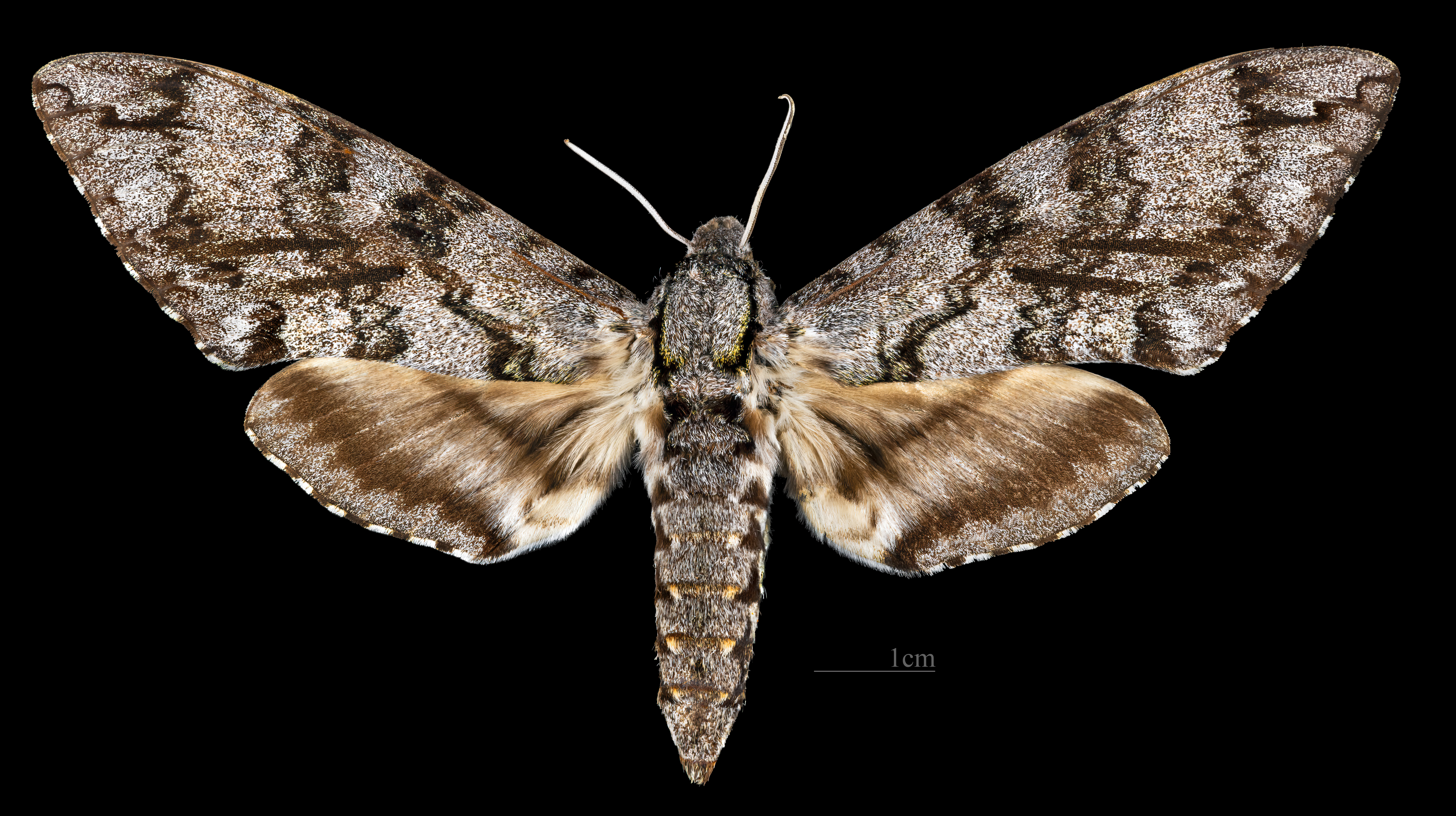
Manduca corumbensis ♀

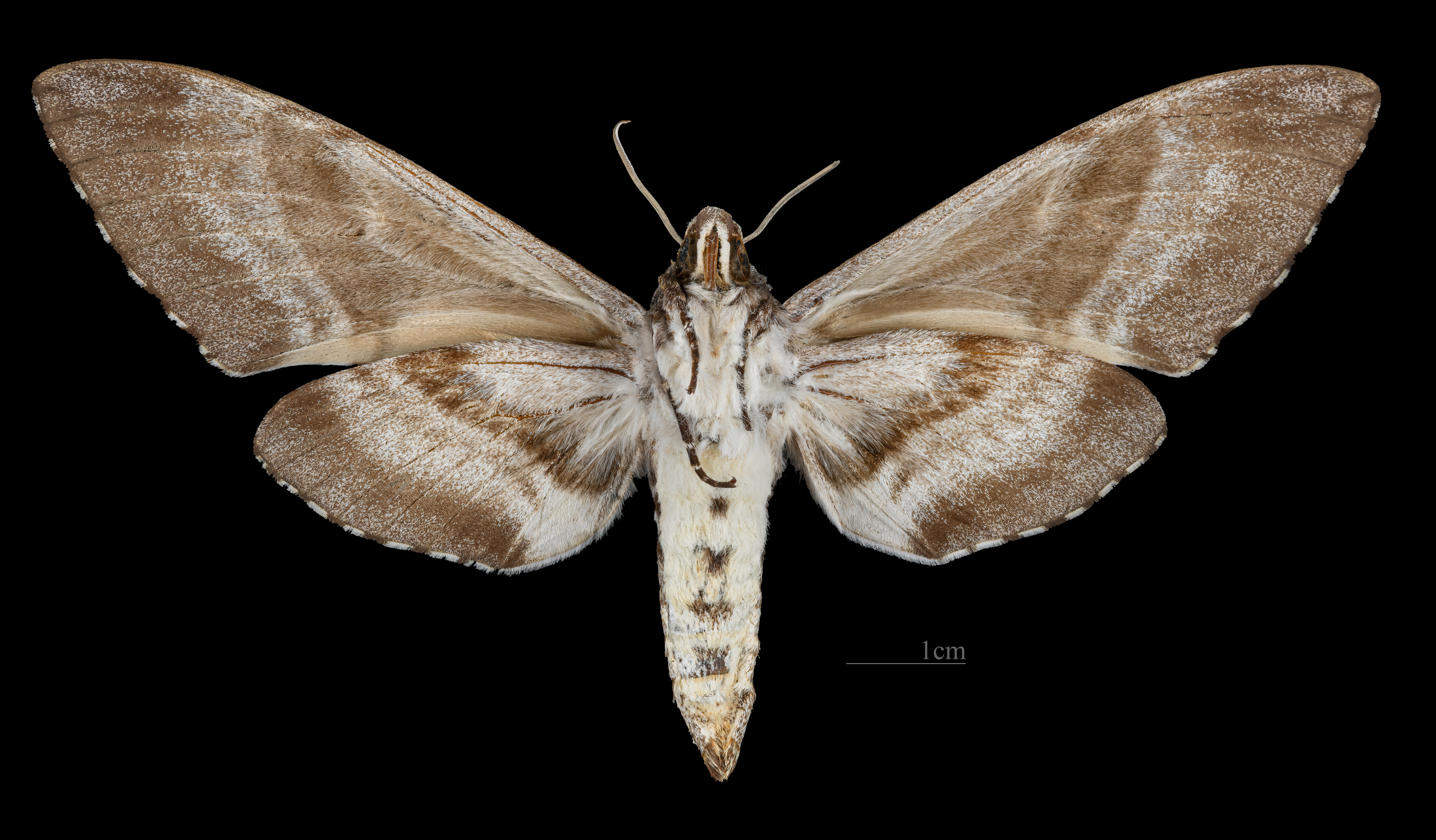
Manduca corumbensis ♀ △

== Biology ==
Adults have been recorded in November and December in Bolivia.
