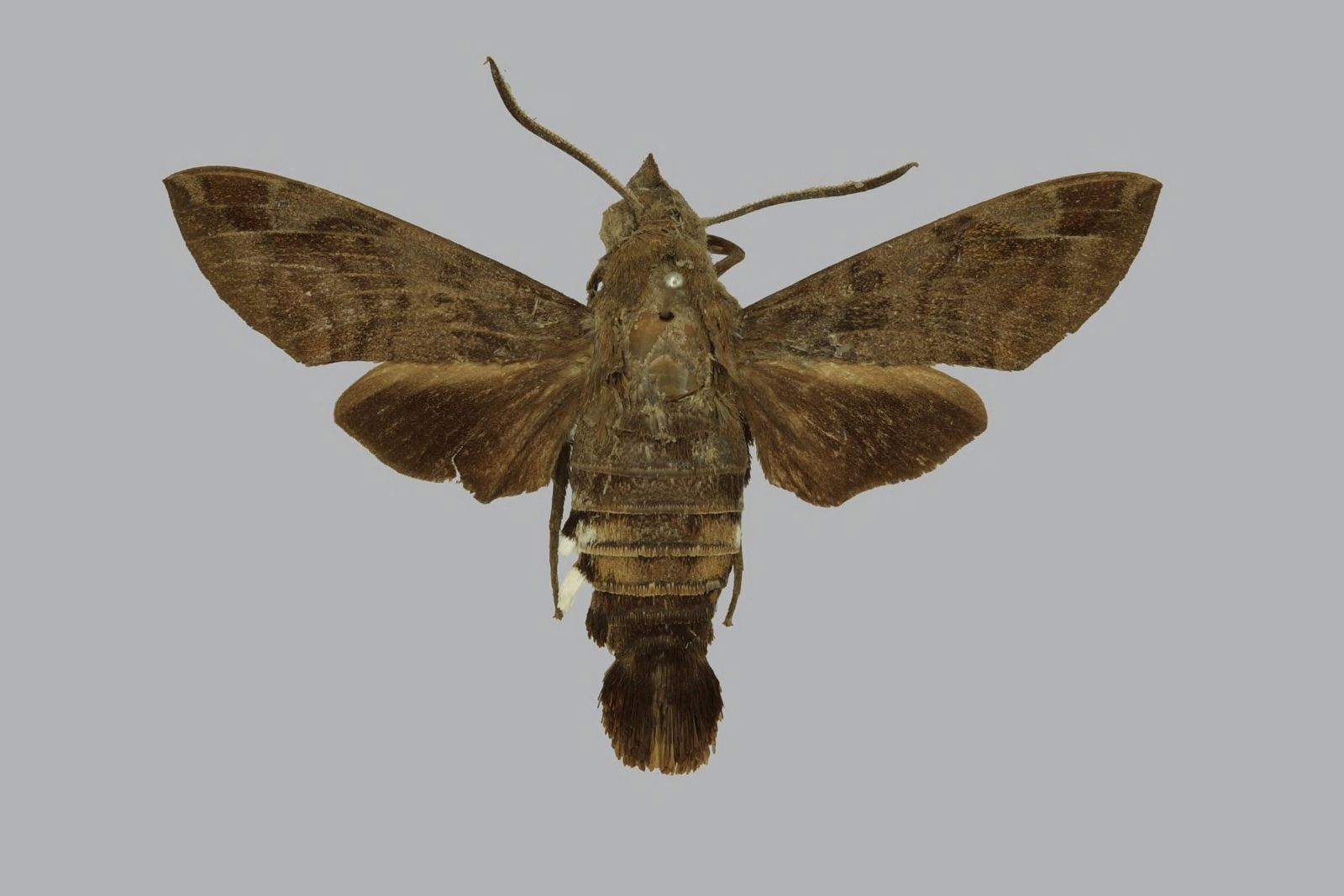

Scientific classification
- Kingdom: Animalia
- Phylum: Arthropoda
- Class: Insecta
- Order: Lepidoptera
- Family: Sphingidae
- Genus: Macroglossum
- Species: M. tenimberi

Binomial name
- Macroglossum tenimberi Clark, 1920

= Macroglossum tenimberi =

Species of moth

Macroglossum tenimberi is a moth of the family Sphingidae. It is known from the Tenimber Islands.
