= Benjamin Preston Clark =

American entomologist (1860–1939)

Benjamin Preston Clark (October 8, 1860, in West Roxbury – January 11, 1939, in Philadelphia) was an American entomologist who specialized in Lepidoptera, especially Sphingidae. He also operated a mercantile business and patented a new form of twine for binding grain.

== Biography ==
=== Early life and education ===
Clark was the direct descendant of Captain Joseph Weld (1599–1646), a progenitor of the wealthy Weld family of Boston. He grew up on the Weld Farm, a plot of 278 acres (1.13 km^{2}) in Roxbury that was granted to his ancestor by the colonial legislature for "bravery fighting the Indians" during the Pequot War in 1637.

He attended Amherst College from 1877 to 1881, where he developed a passion for the natural sciences. However, the failure of his father's mercantile firm (B. C. Clark & Co.) in 1881 forced him to set aside his plans of a career in academia, and to enter the business world. On 21 January 1890 he married Josephine Frances Allen, who was also a herbarium specimen collector.

=== Entomology ===
Clark wrote in 1922 that his interest in Sphingidae began in childhood: "...as a boy I used to see poised with whirring wings over the phlox garden at Weld Farm, and which always had for me a peculiar fascination." His large collection of more than 7,200 specimens was acquired through international correspondence with more than 500 collectors. It included representatives of more than 1300 species. The collection, which included the type specimens of 232 species described by Clark, was donated in its entirety but for a small portion which remains in the family to the Carnegie Museum of Natural History after his death.

=== Additional Sources ===
- Rahn, R. A. (1997). "[Clark, B. P.]". News Lep. Soc. 39 (4): 73, 89.
- Rehn, J. A. G. (1939). "[Clark, B. P.]". Ent. News 50: 90.
- Sachtleben, H. (1939). "[Clark, B. P.]". Arb. morph. taxon. Ent. Berlin-Dahlem 6: 209.
