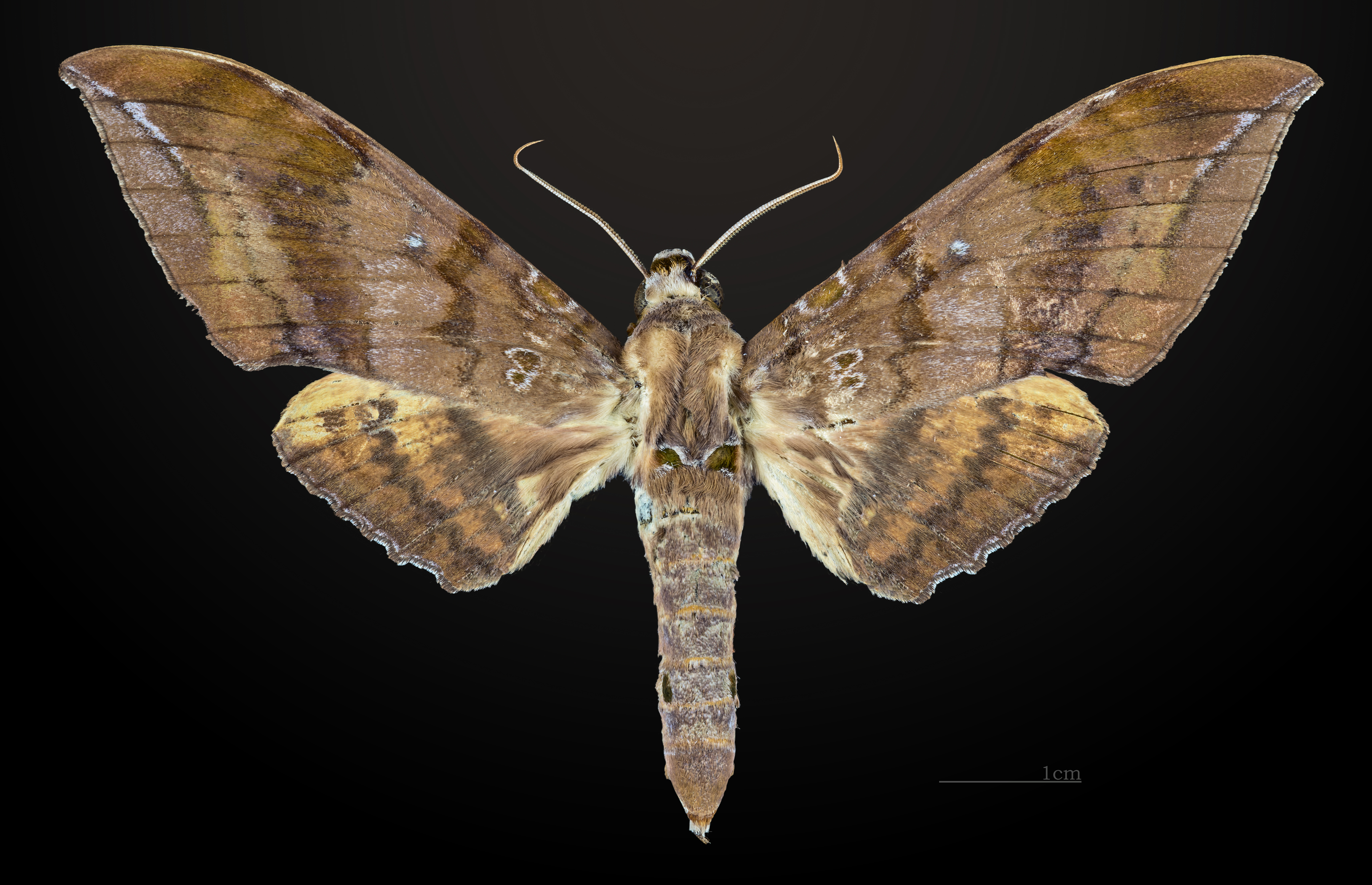
- Ambulyx semiferven Dorsal
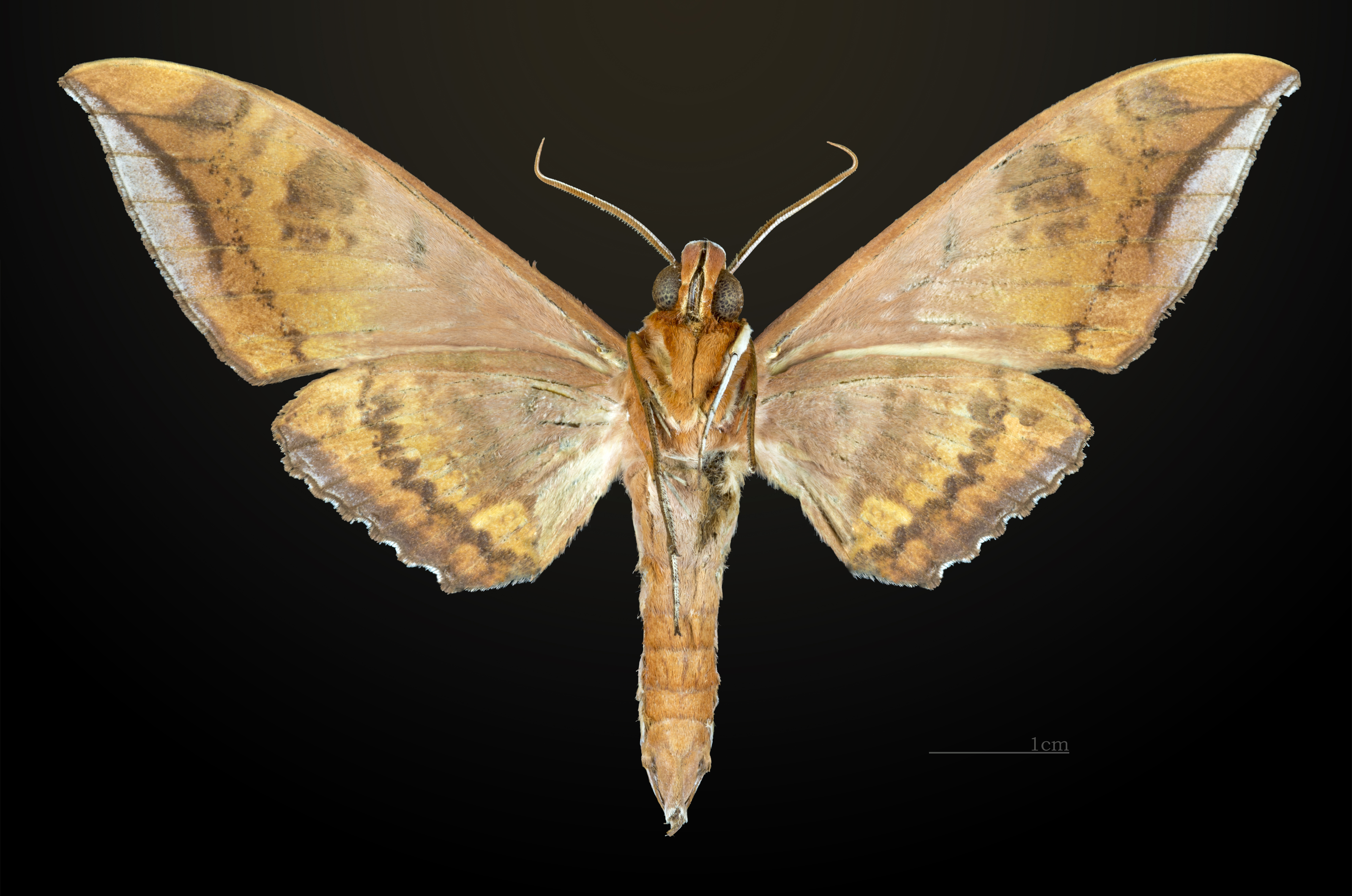
- Ambulyx semiferven Ventral

Scientific classification
- Kingdom: Animalia
- Phylum: Arthropoda
- Class: Insecta
- Order: Lepidoptera
- Family: Sphingidae
- Genus: Ambulyx
- Species: A. semifervens

Binomial name
- Ambulyx semifervens (Walker, 1865)

Synonyms
- Basiana semifervens Walker, 1865

= Ambulyx semifervens =

Species of moth

Ambulyx semifervens is a species of moth of the family Sphingidae. It originates from Indonesia (the Moluccas and Sulawesi).

It is similar to Ambulyx subocellata and Ambulyx dohertyi, but the wings are broader and the distal margin of the forewing is more convex.
