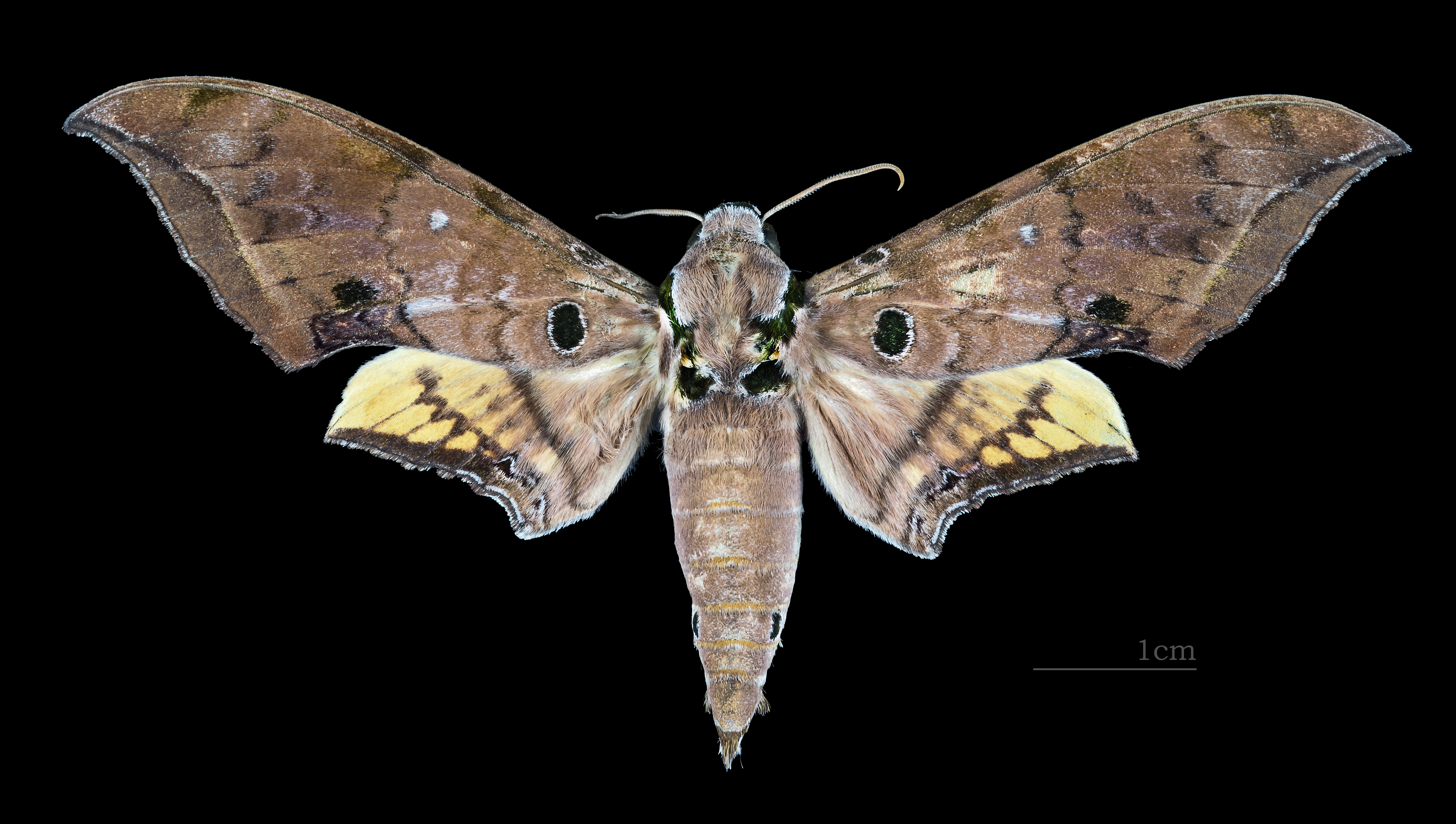
- Male dorsal view
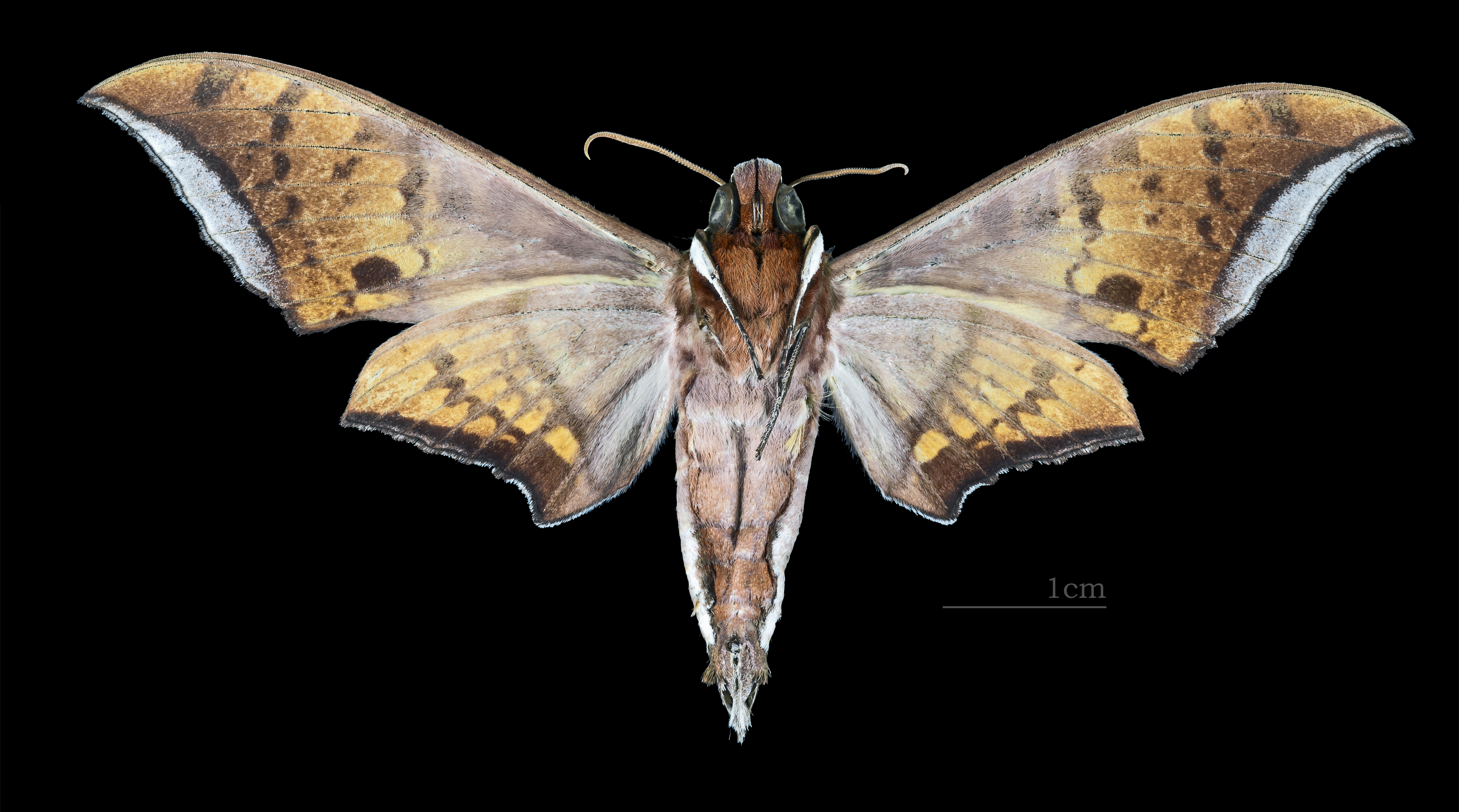
- Male ventral view

Scientific classification
- Kingdom: Animalia
- Phylum: Arthropoda
- Class: Insecta
- Order: Lepidoptera
- Family: Sphingidae
- Genus: Ambulyx
- Species: A. dohertyi

Binomial name
- Ambulyx dohertyi Rothschild, 1894

Synonyms
- Ambulyx annulifera Swinhoe, 1892; Oxyambulyx dohertyi queenslandi Clark, 1928; Oxyambulyx dohertyi salomonis Rothschild & Jordan, 1903

= Ambulyx dohertyi =

Species of moth

Ambulyx dohertyi is a species of moth of the family Sphingidae first described by Walter Rothschild in 1894.

== Distribution ==
It is known from the Solomon Islands, Papua New Guinea and Queensland, Australia.

== Description ==
It is similar to Ambulyx moorei and Ambulyx semifervens but the greenish olive stripe across tegula is sharply defined and broader, continued onto the metanotum as a broad stripe.

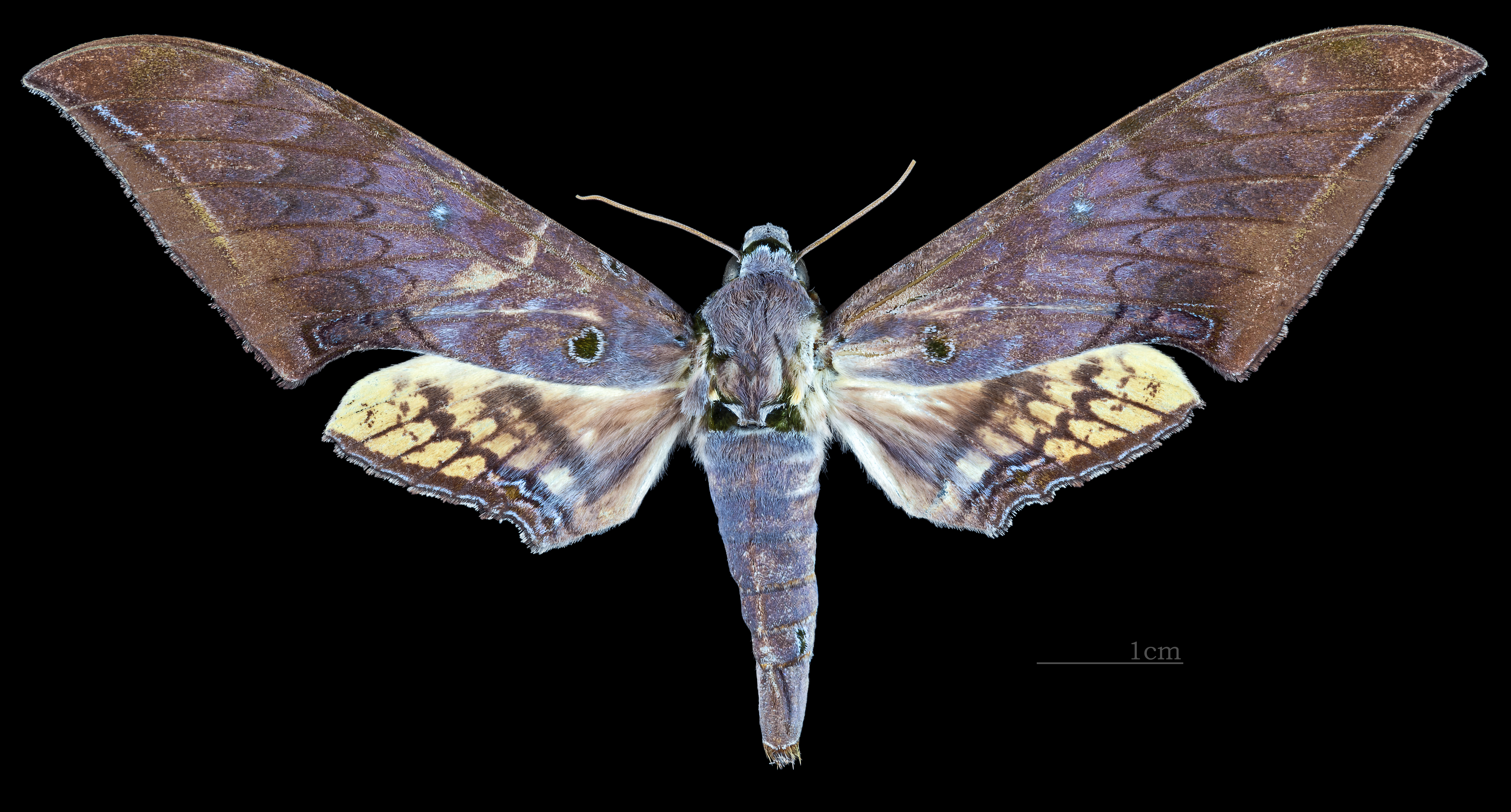
Female dorsal view

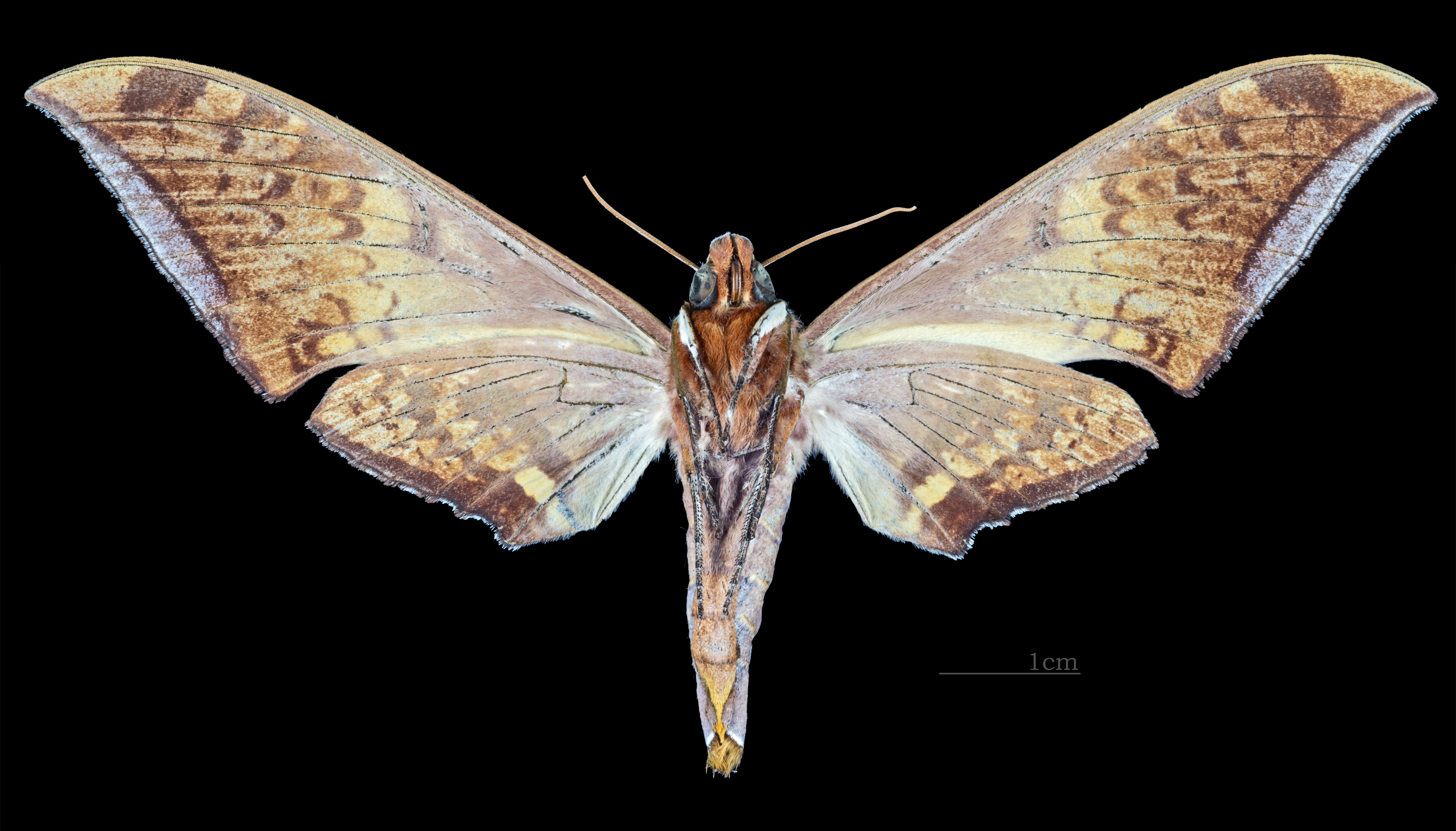
Female ventral view

== Subspecies ==
- Ambulyx dohertyi dohertyi
- Ambulyx dohertyi novobritannica Brechlin & Kitching, 2010 (Papua New Guinea)
- Ambulyx dohertyi novoirlandensis Brechlin & Kitching, 2010 (Papua New Guinea)
- Ambulyx dohertyi queenslandi Clark, 1928 (Papua New Guinea, Queensland)
- Ambulyx dohertyi salomonis (Rothschild & Jordan, 1903) (Solomon Islands)
