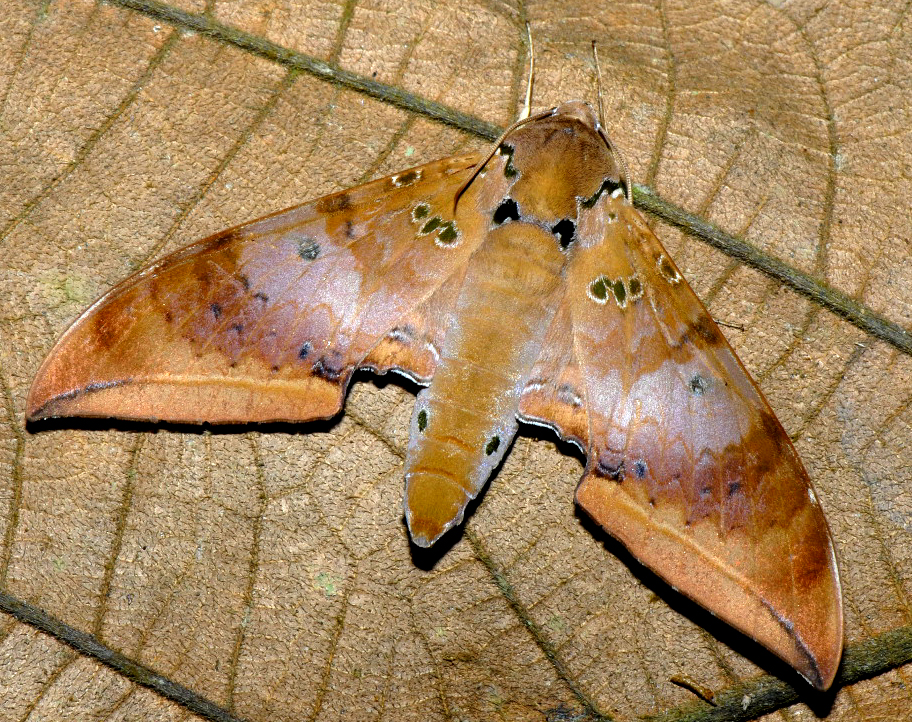

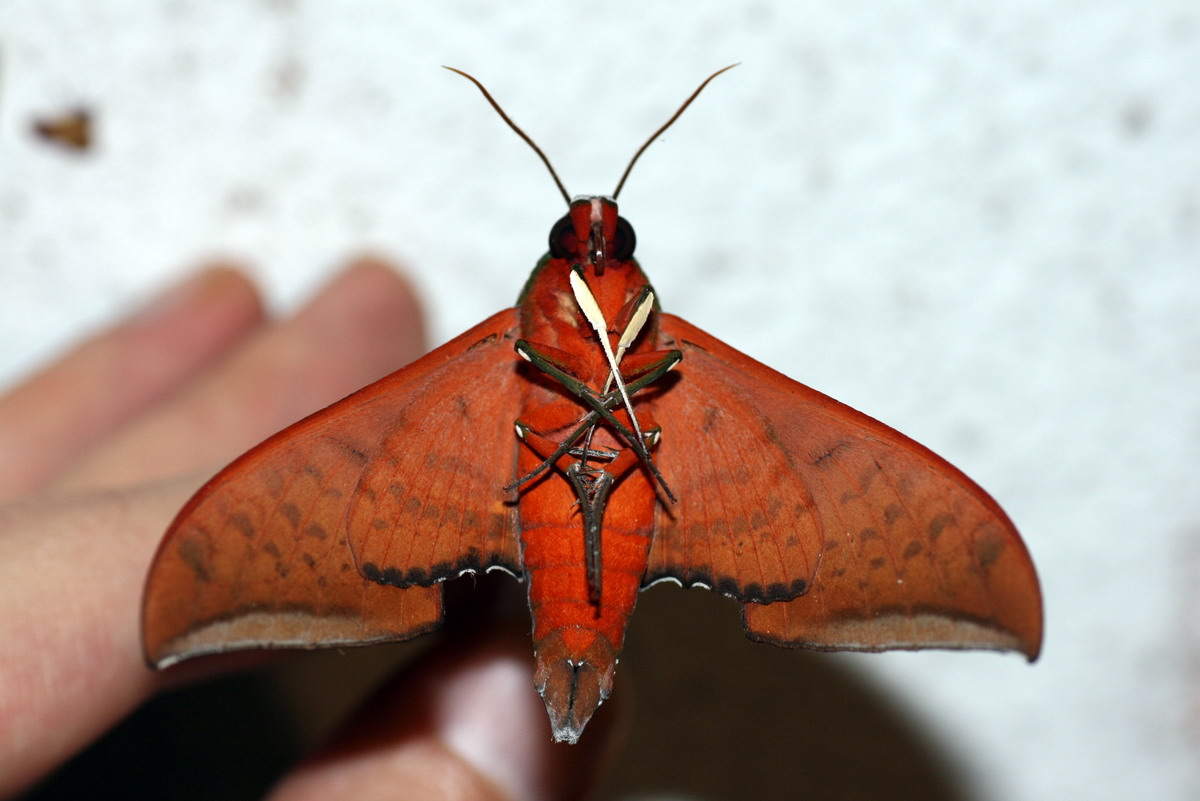

Scientific classification
- Kingdom: Animalia
- Phylum: Arthropoda
- Clade: Pancrustacea
- Class: Insecta
- Order: Lepidoptera
- Family: Sphingidae
- Genus: Ambulyx
- Species: A. moorei

Binomial name
- Ambulyx moorei Moore, [1858]

Synonyms
- Ambulyx decolor (Schaufuss, 1870); Ambulyx subocellata Felder, 1874; Ambulyx turbata Butler, 1875; Ambulyx thwaitesii Moore, [1882]; Ambulyx nubila Huwe, 1895; Ambulyx chinensis (Clark, 1922); Oxyambulyx subocellata Rothschild & Jordan, 1903; Smerinthus decolor Schaufuss, 1870; Oxyambulyx moorei chinensis Clark, 1922

= Ambulyx moorei =

Cinnamon gliding hawkmoth

Species of moth

Ambulyx moorei, the cinnamon gliding hawkmoth, is a moth of the family Sphingidae. The species was first described by Frederic Moore in 1858. It is found in Sri Lanka, southern and eastern India, the Nicobar Islands and Andaman Islands, Thailand, Vietnam, southern China, the Philippines (Palawan, Balabac), Malaysia (Peninsular, Sarawak), Singapore and Indonesia (Sumatra, Java, Kalimantan).

== Description ==
The wingspan is 100–110 mm.

== Biology ==
Larvae have been recorded on Canarium album in China. Other recorded food plants include Buchanania and Lannea species. These moths are very sluggish during the day but fly well at night.

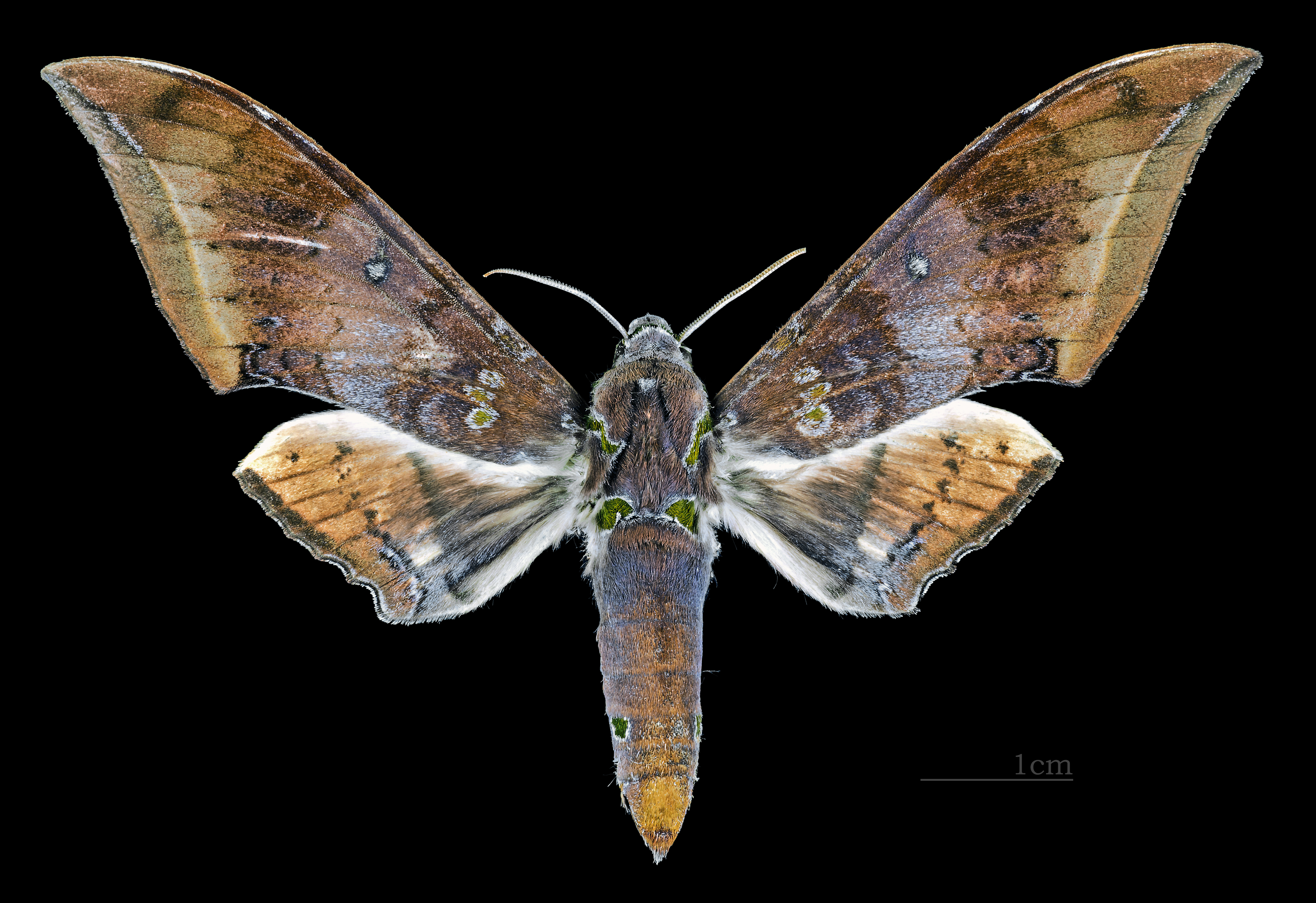
Male, dorsal view

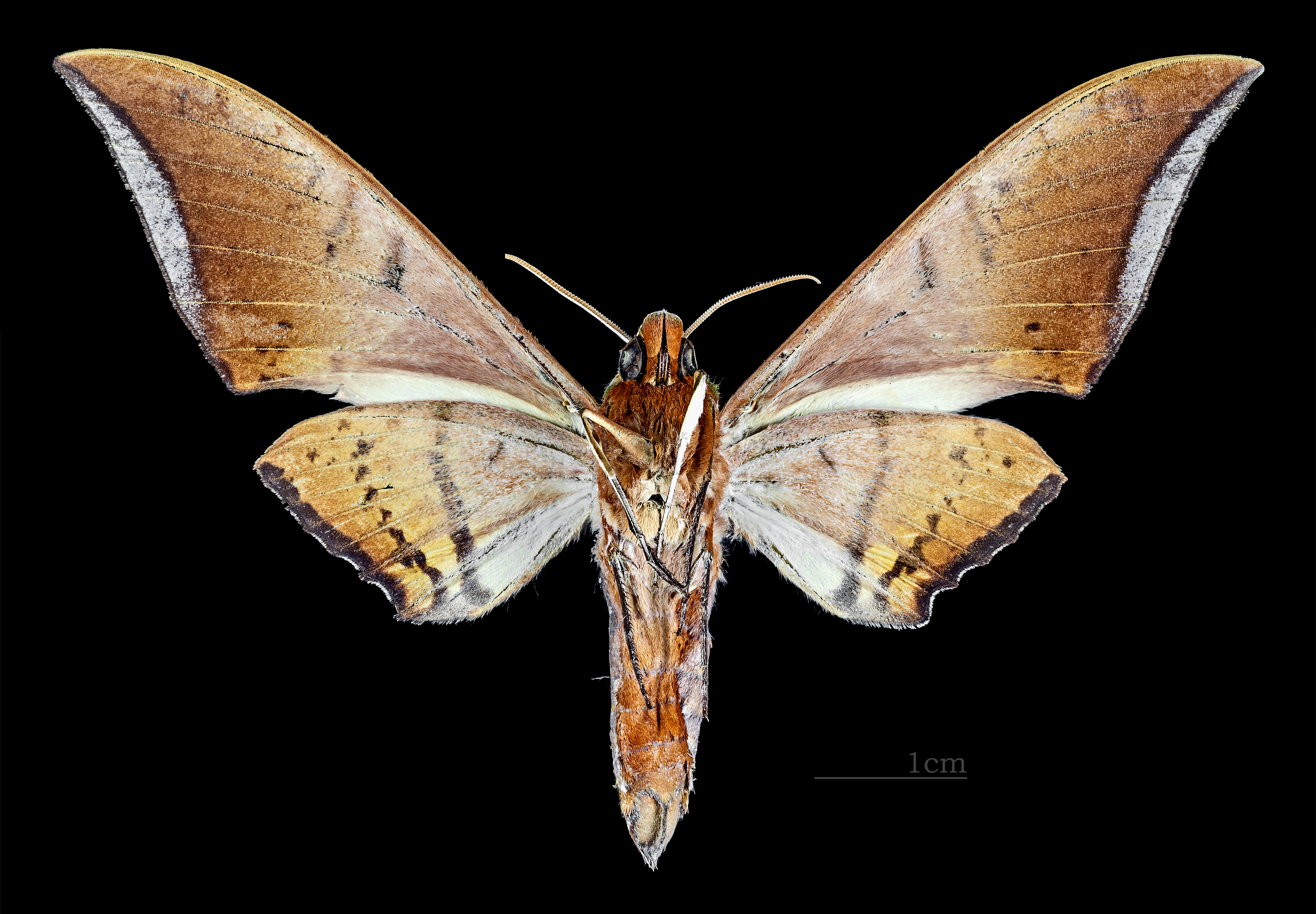
Male, ventral view
