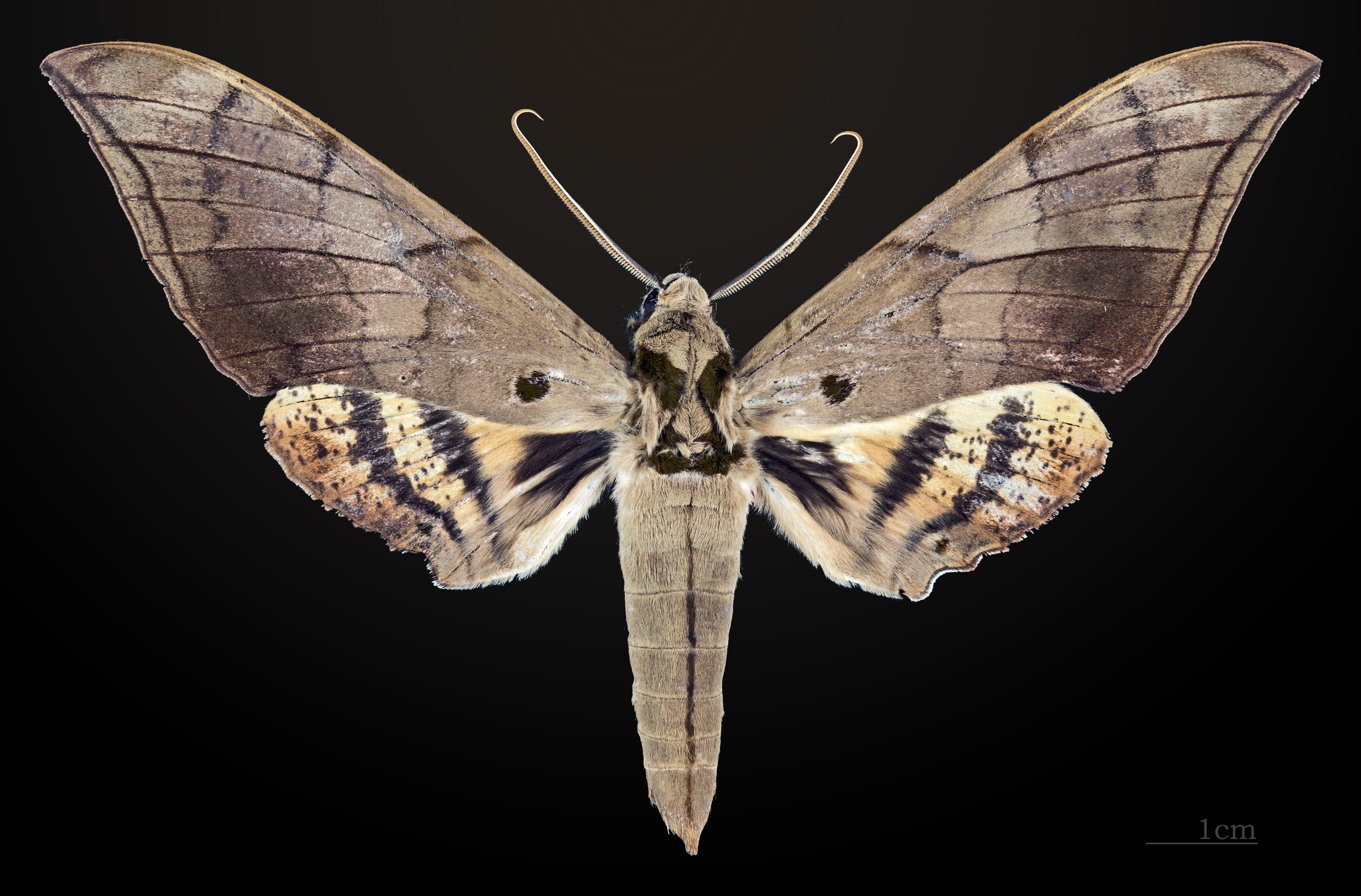

Scientific classification
- Kingdom: Animalia
- Phylum: Arthropoda
- Class: Insecta
- Order: Lepidoptera
- Family: Sphingidae
- Genus: Ambulyx
- Species: A. staudingeri

Binomial name
- Ambulyx staudingeri Rothschild, 1894

= Ambulyx staudingeri =

Species of moth

Ambulyx staudingeri is a species of moth of the family Sphingidae first described by Walter Rothschild in 1894. It is known from the Philippines.

== Description ==
It is similar to Ambulyx pryeri, but the posterior third of the forewing upperside subterminal line is closer to the termen, and most specimens have a dark tornal shade. The species name honours Otto Staudinger.

== Gallery ==
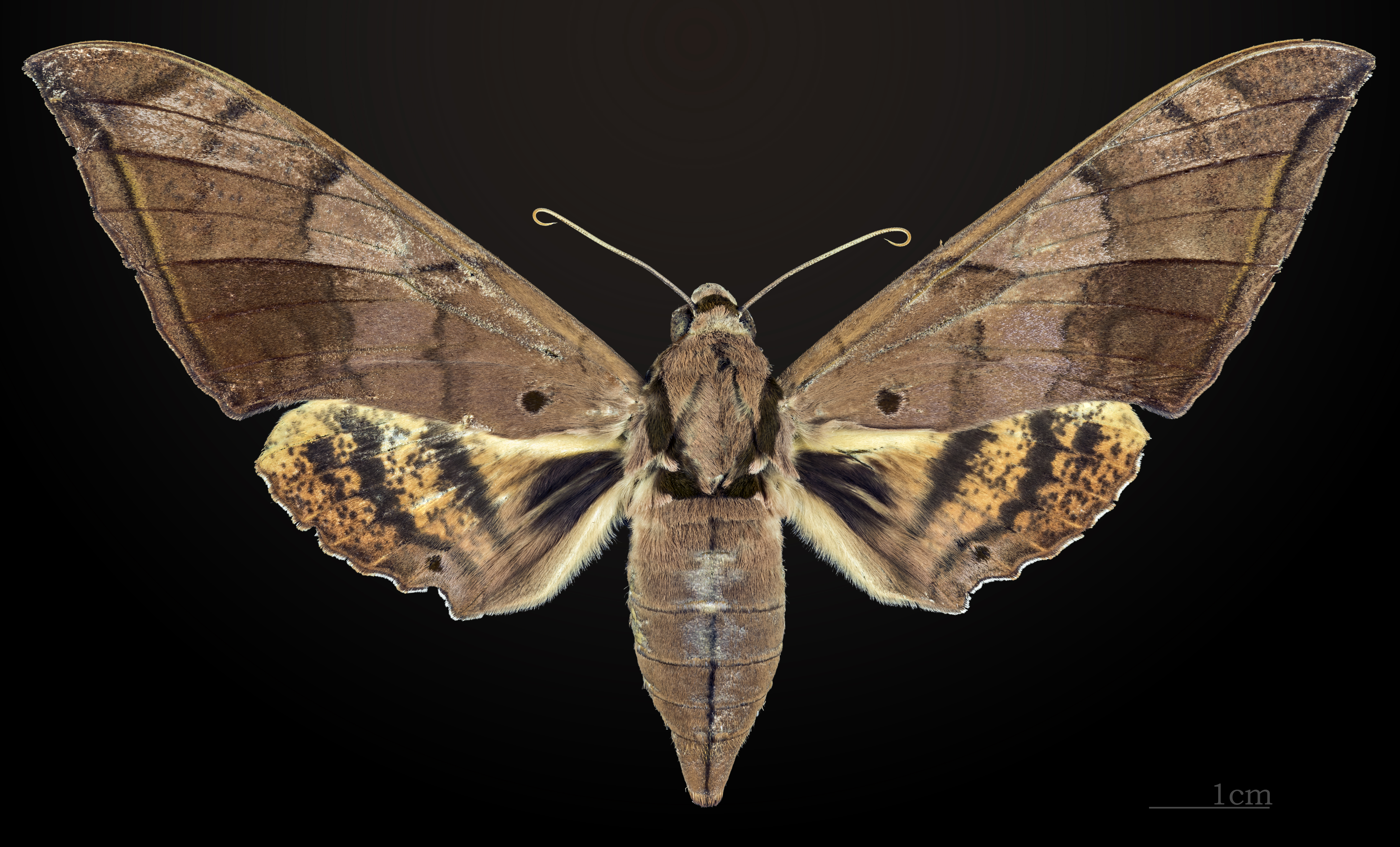
Female

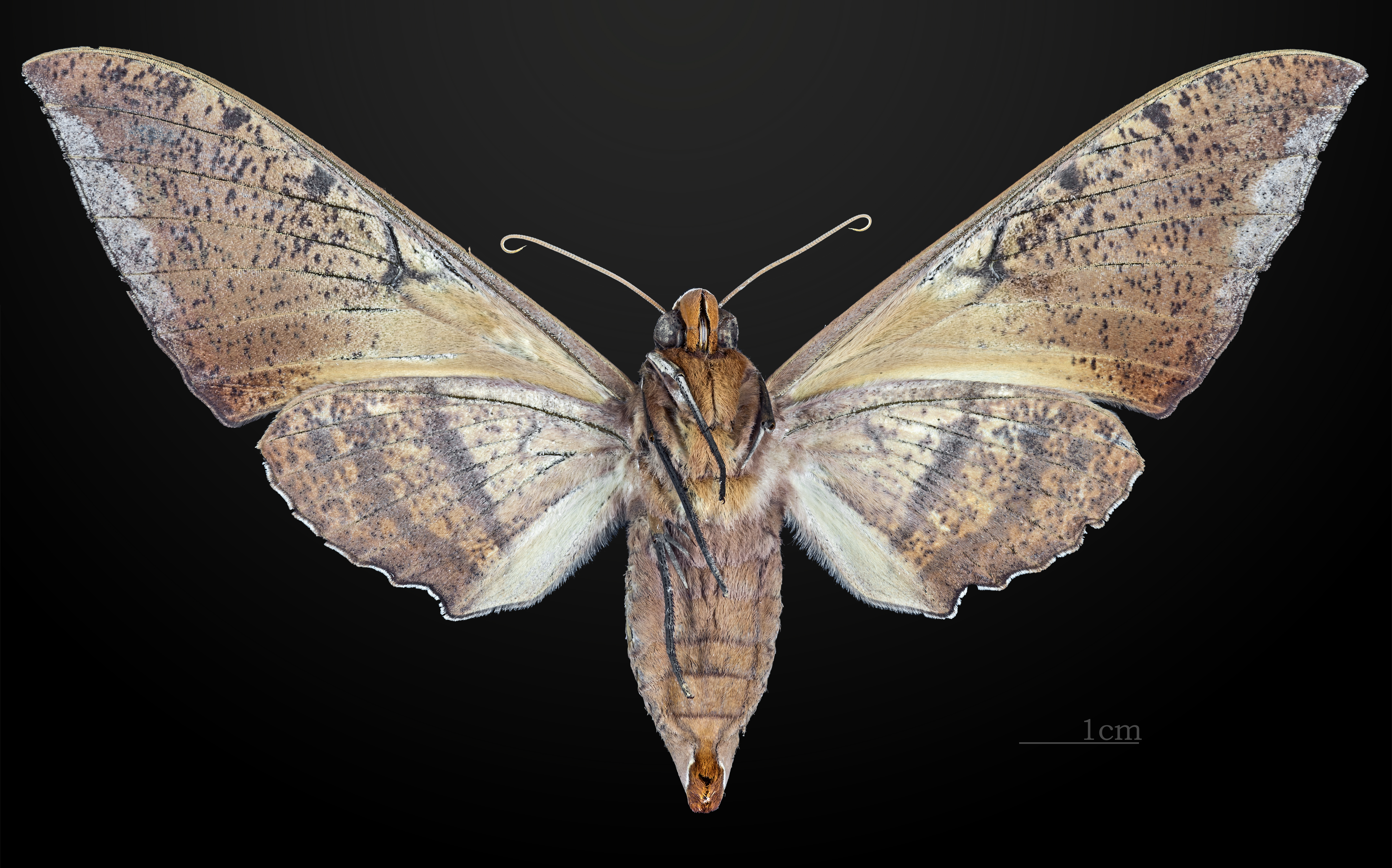
Female underside

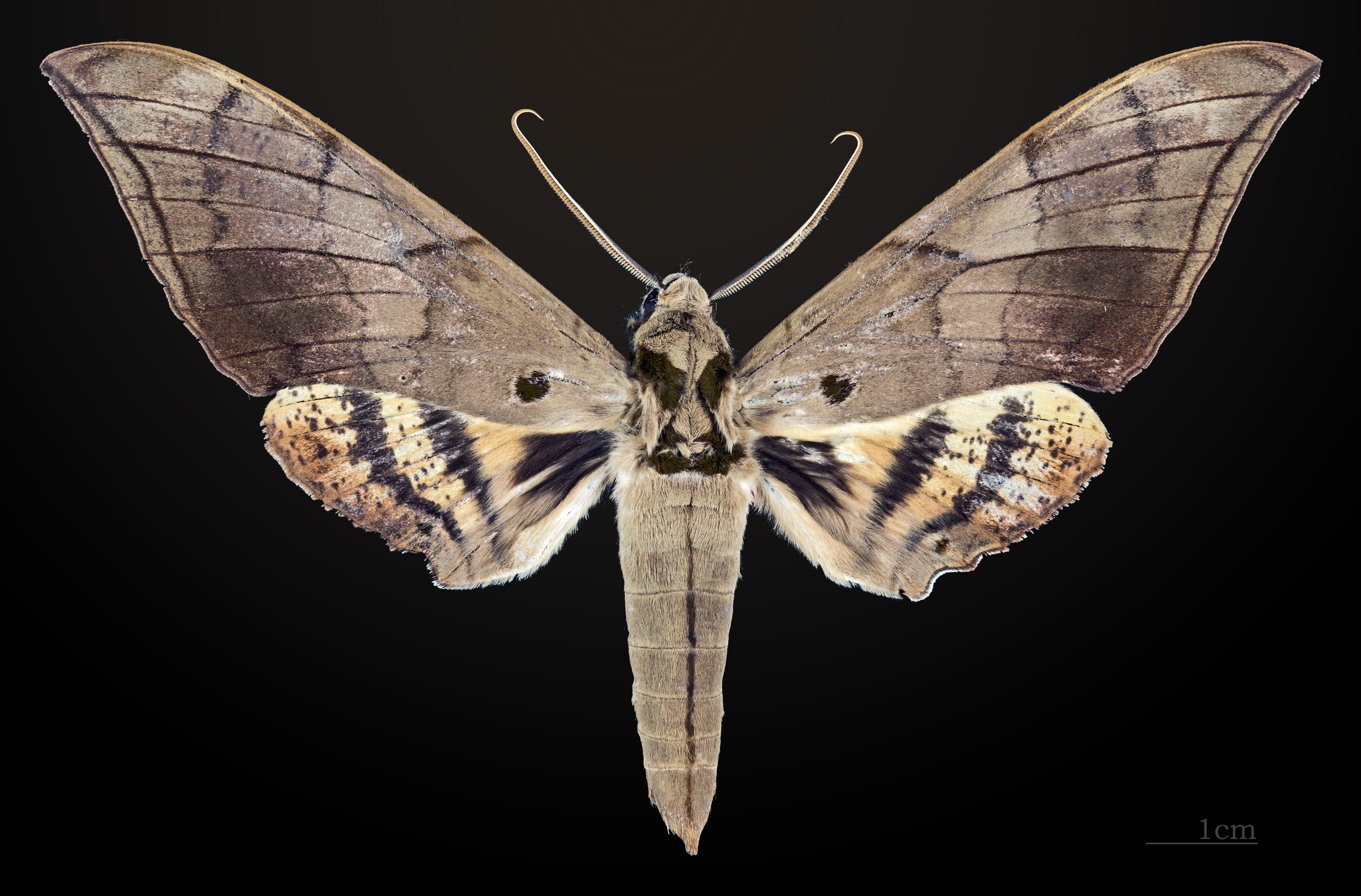
Male

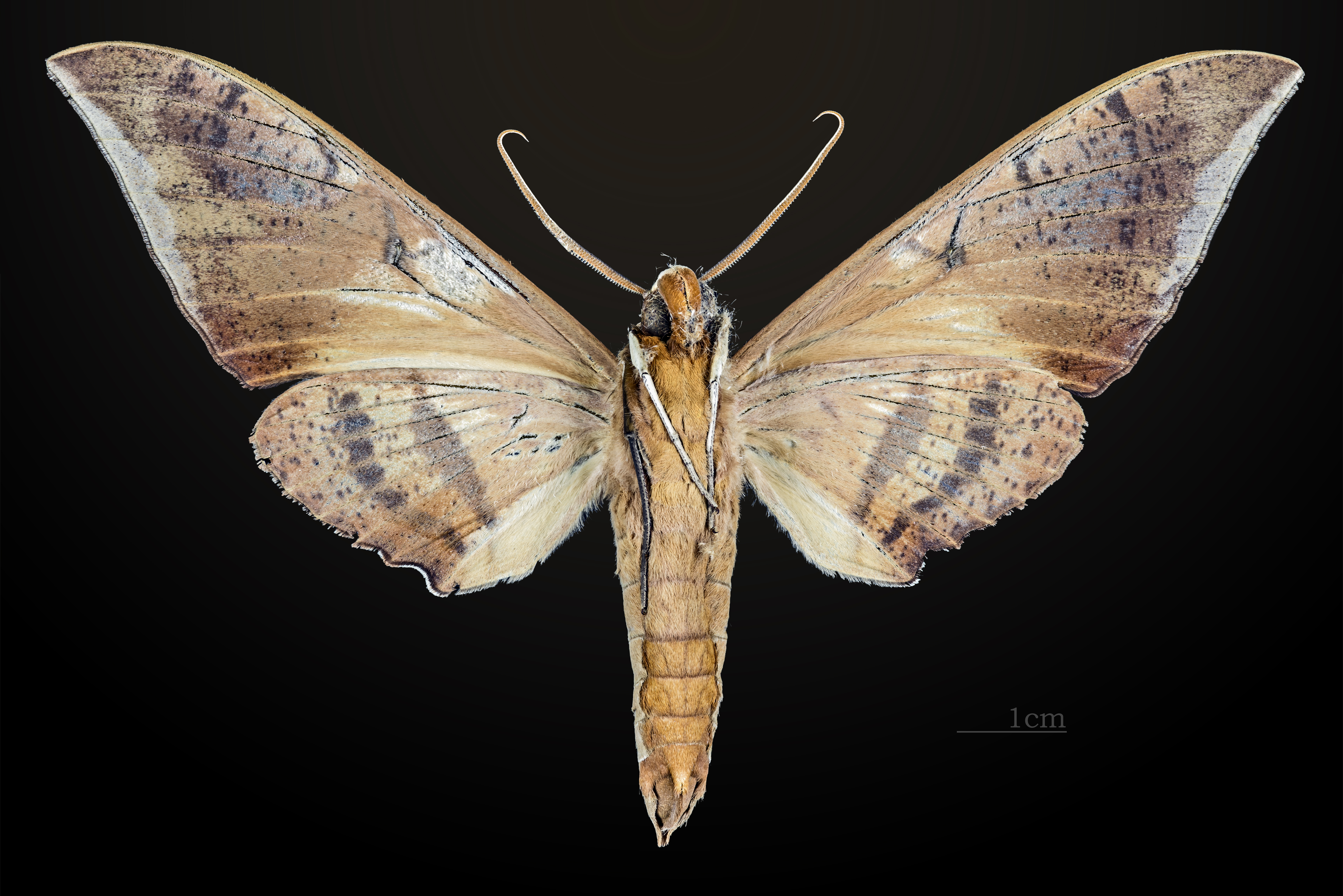
Male underside
