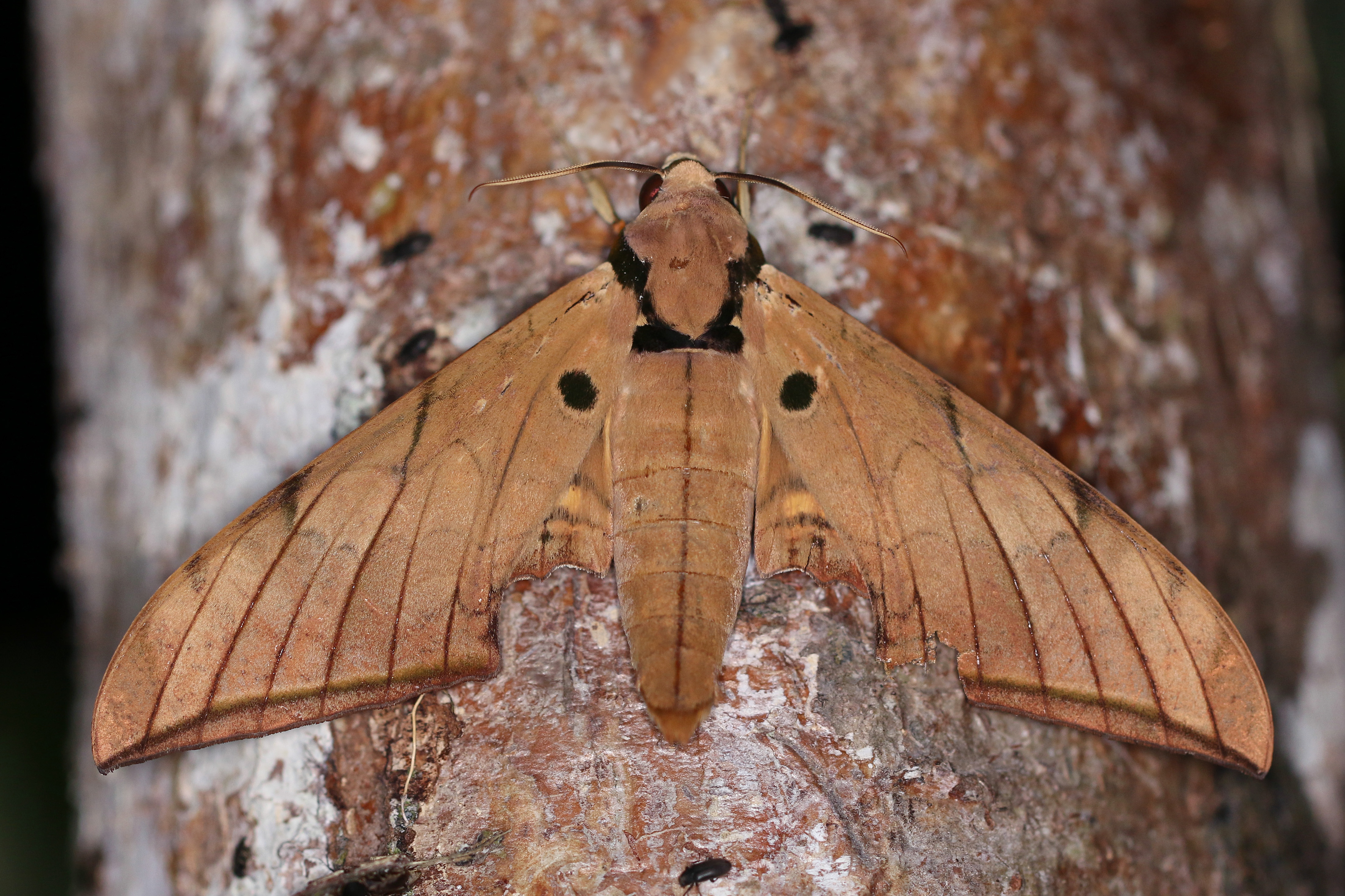
- A. p. pryeri Sabah, Borneo

Scientific classification
- Kingdom: Animalia
- Phylum: Arthropoda
- Class: Insecta
- Order: Lepidoptera
- Family: Sphingidae
- Genus: Ambulyx
- Species: A. pryeri

Binomial name
- Ambulyx pryeri Distant, 1887

Synonyms
- Ambulyx eteocles Huwe, 1895; Oxyambulyx eteocles Rothschild & Jordan, 1903; Oxyambulyx sumatranus Rothschild, 1920; Oxyambulyx pryeri Distant; Diehl, 1980

= Ambulyx pryeri =

Species of moth

Ambulyx pryeri is a moth of the family Sphingidae first described by William Lucas Distant in 1887. It is found in Sundaland.Also found in Nepal.

== Gallery ==
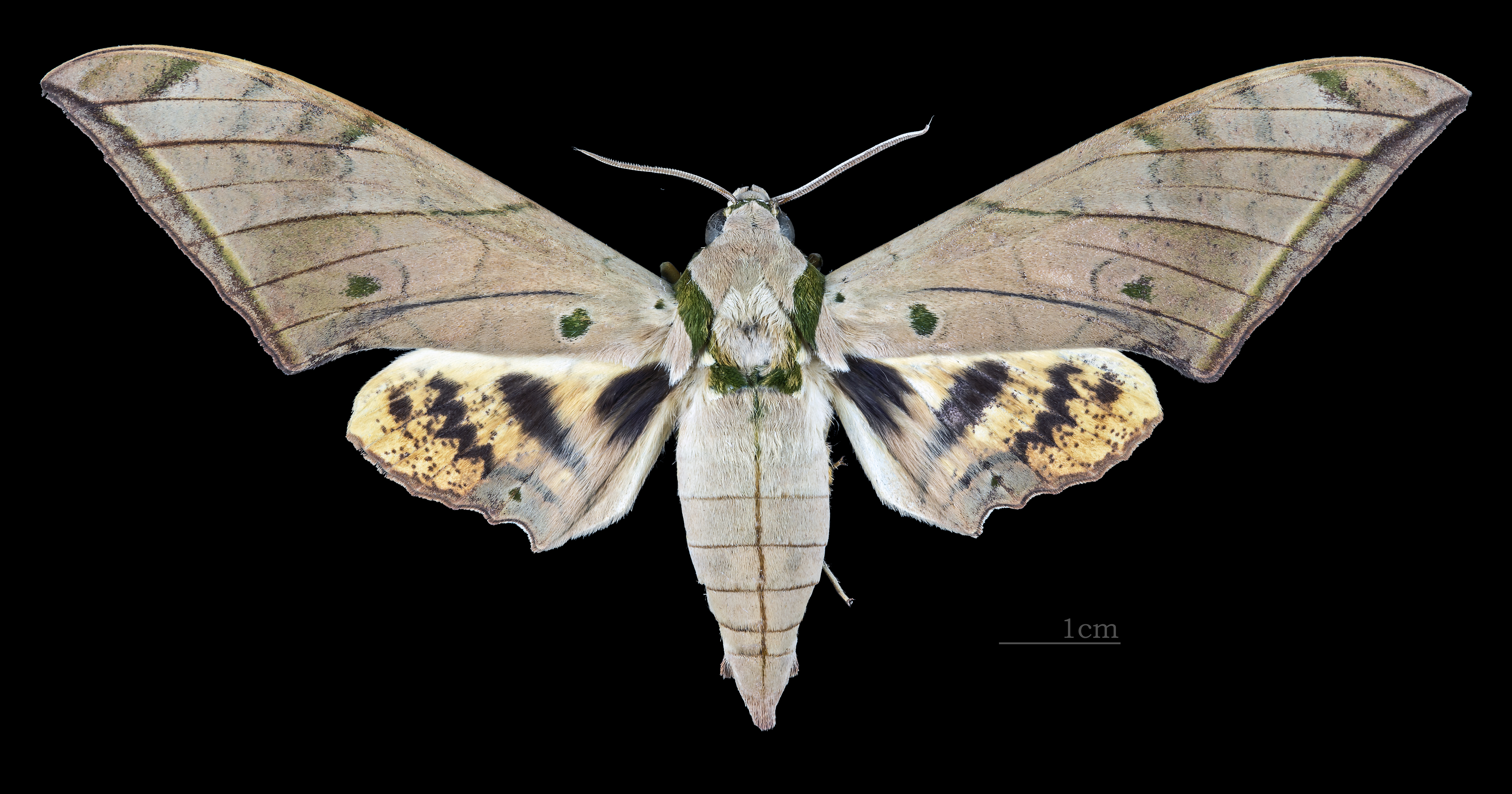
Male, dorsal view

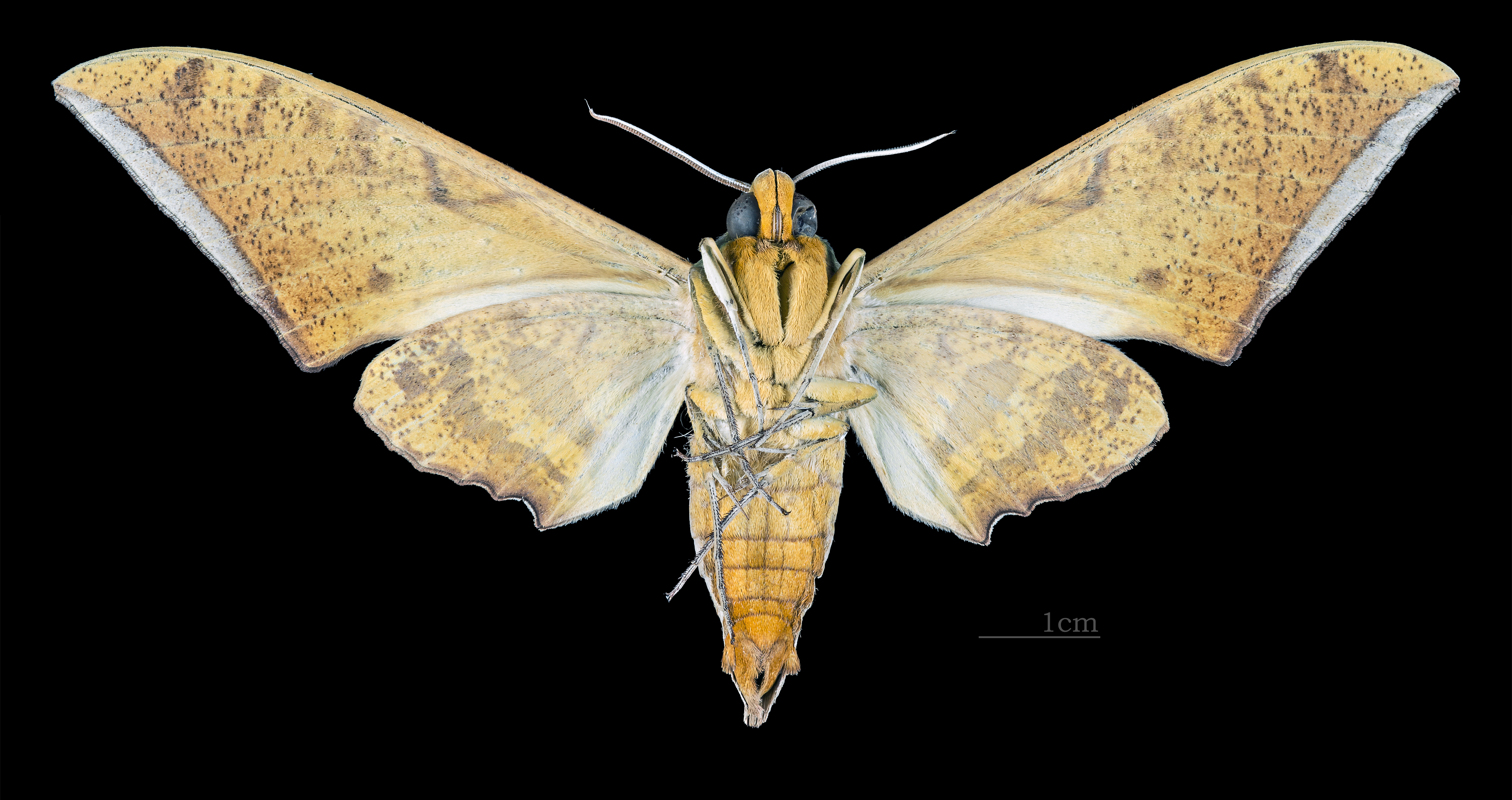
Male, ventral view

== Biology ==
Larvae have been recorded on Plumeria species.

== Subspecies ==
- Ambulyx pryeri pryeri (Thailand, Malaysia, Borneo, Sumatra, Java, the Philippines)
- Ambulyx pryeri tenggarensis Brechlin, 2009 (Flores)
