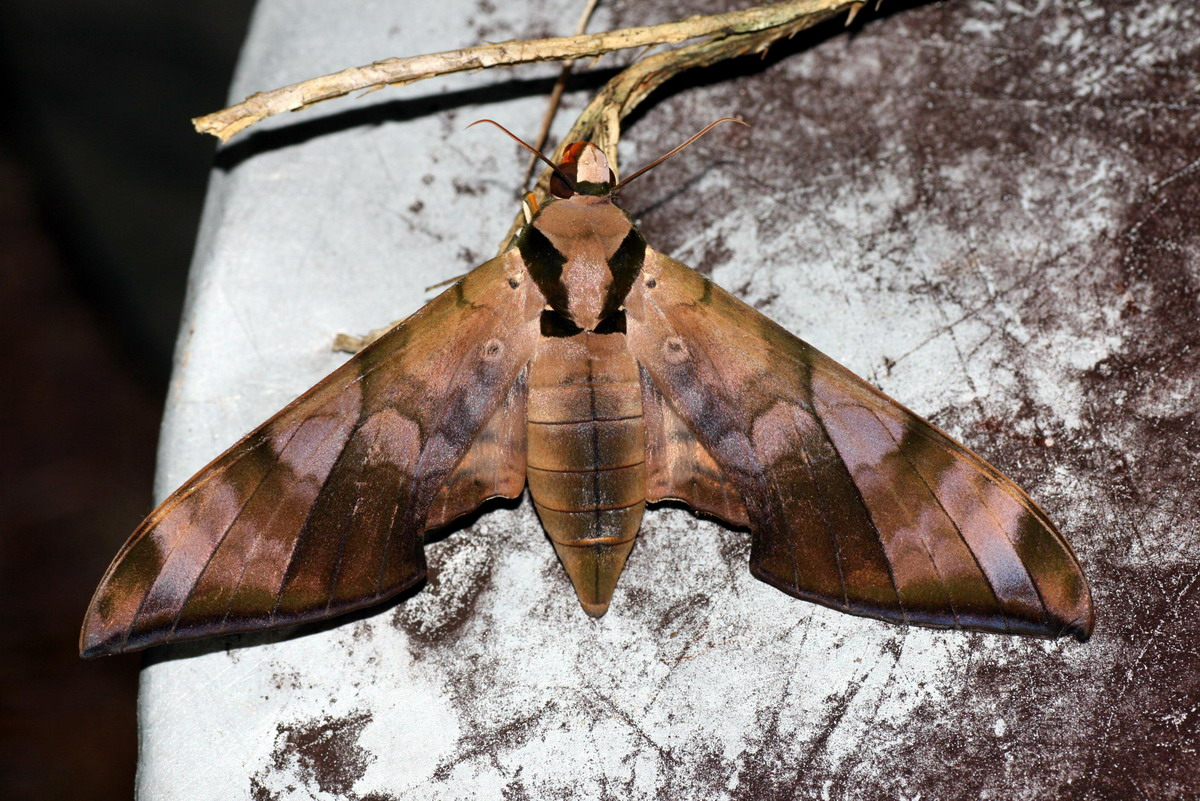

Scientific classification
- Kingdom: Animalia
- Phylum: Arthropoda
- Class: Insecta
- Order: Lepidoptera
- Family: Sphingidae
- Genus: Ambulyx
- Species: A. tattina

Binomial name
- Ambulyx tattina (Jordan, 1919)

Synonyms
- Oxyambulyx tattina Jordan, 1919; Ambulyx tattina borneensis Gehlen, 1940; Oxyambulyx tattina uichancoi Clark, 1938

= Ambulyx tattina =

Species of moth

Ambulyx tattina is a species of moth of the family Sphingidae first described by Karl Jordan in 1919.

== Gallery ==
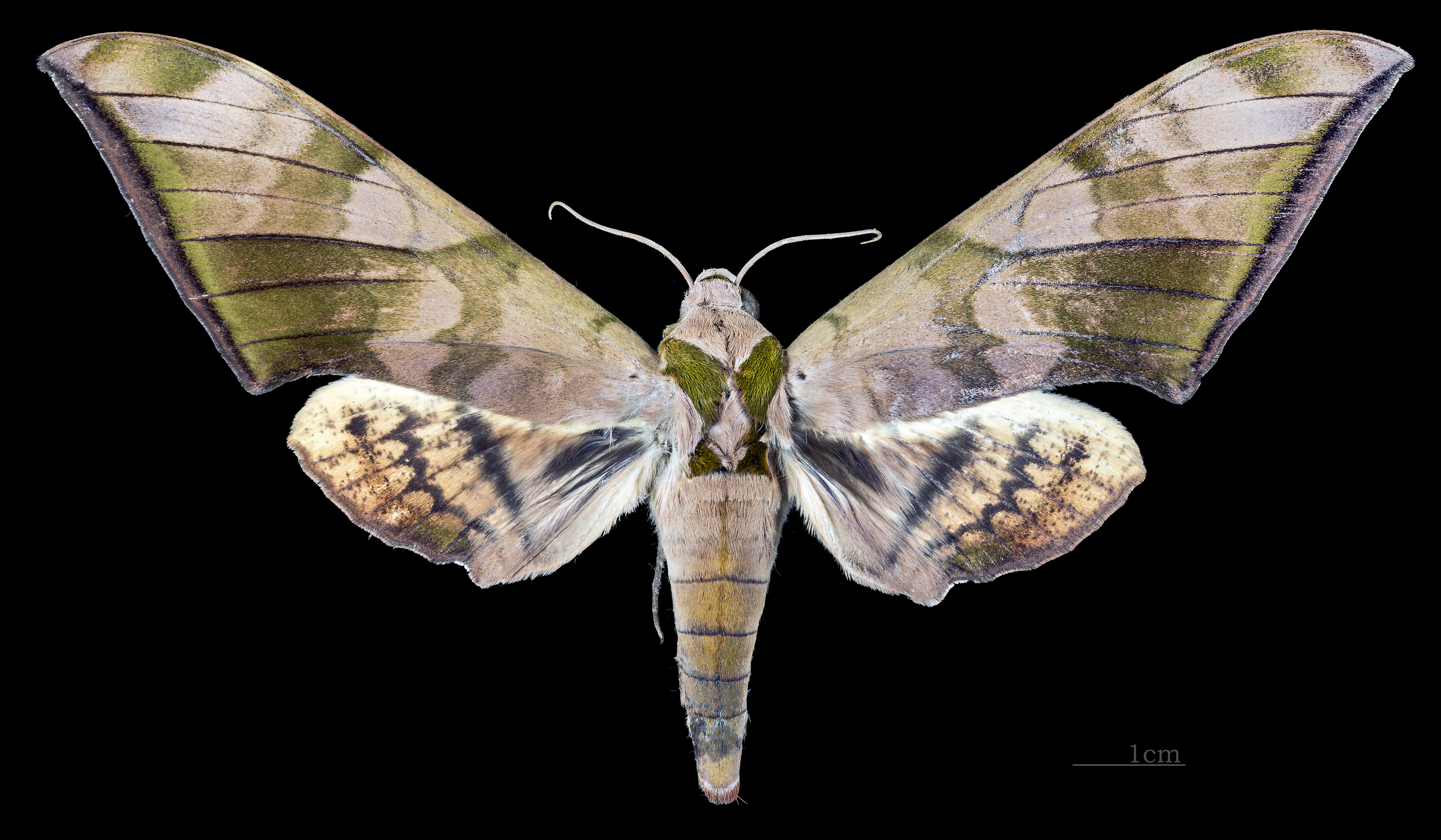
Female, dorsal view

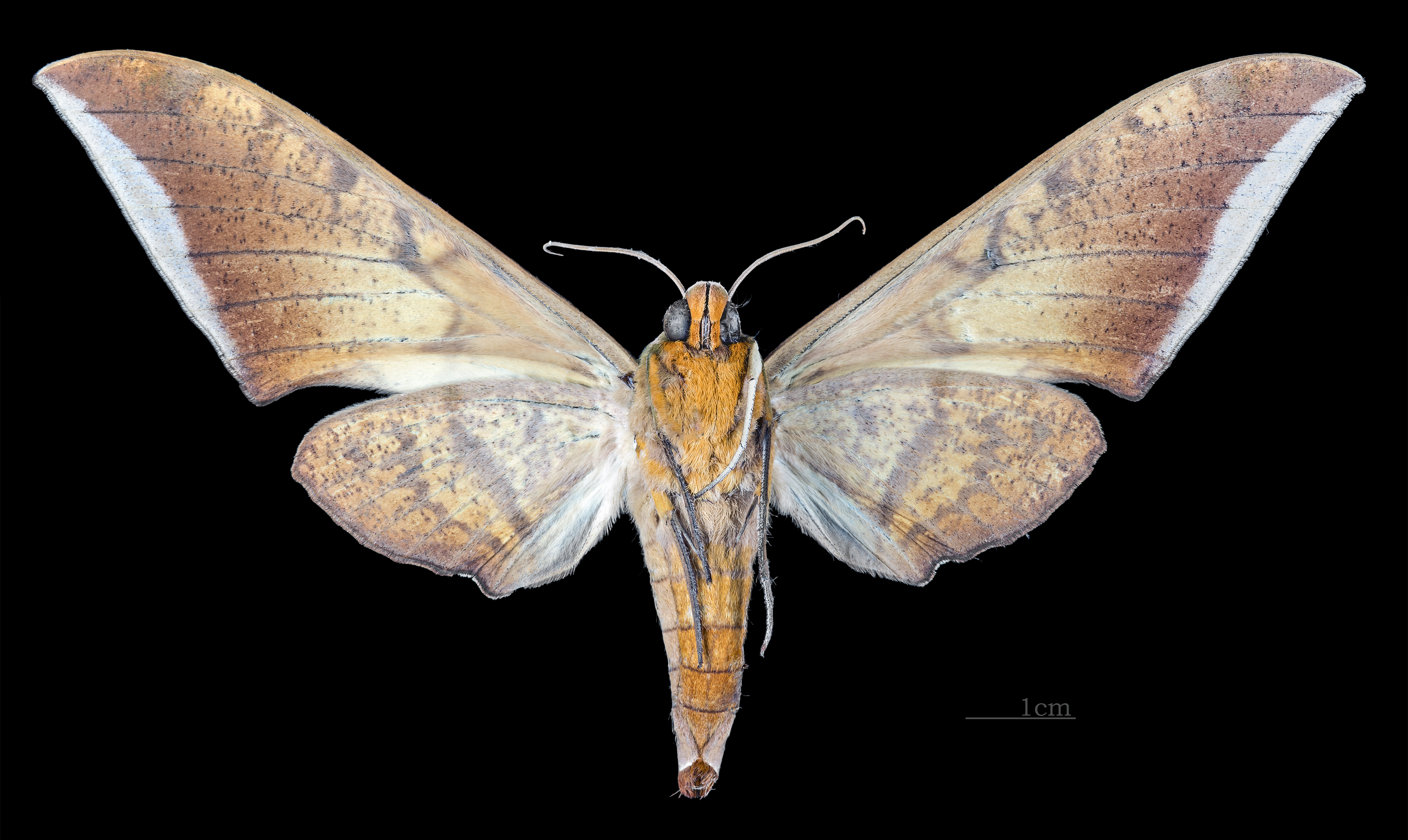
Female, ventral view

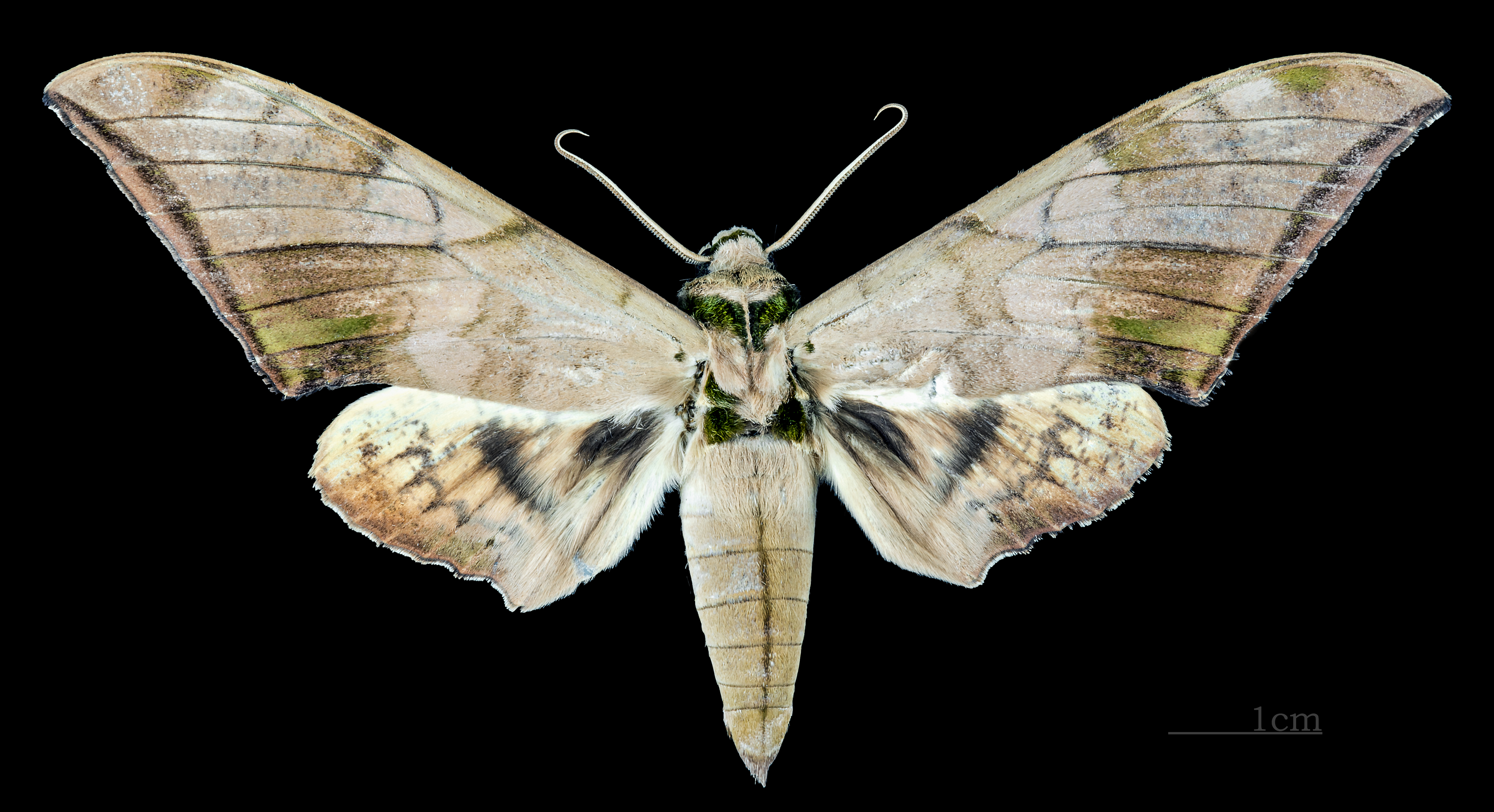
Male, dorsal view

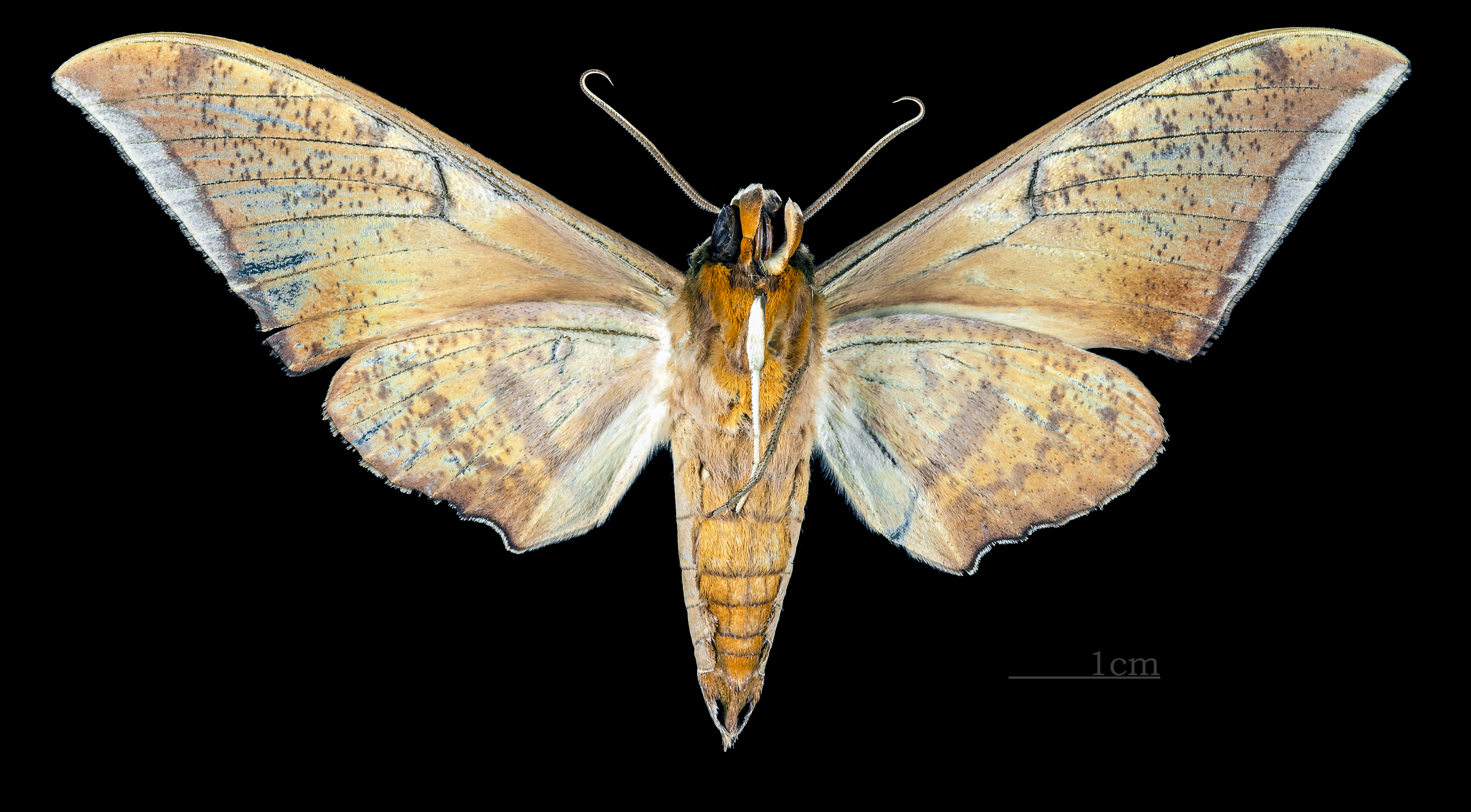
Male, ventral view

== Subspecies ==
- Ambulyx tattina tattina (Thailand, Malaysia, Borneo, Sumatra, Java, the Philippines)
- Ambulyx tattina uichancoi (Clark, 1938) (the Philippines)
