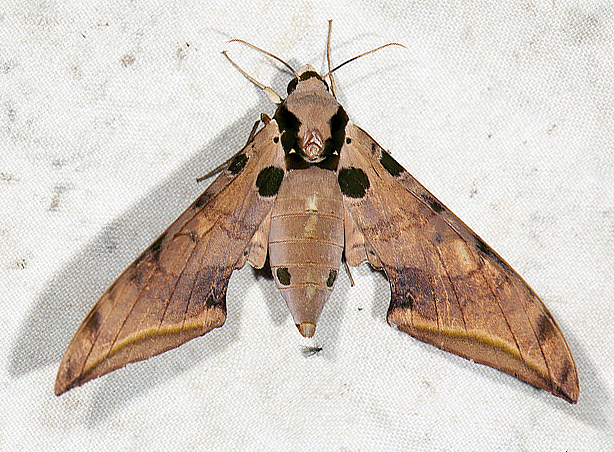
- Ambulyx semiplacida

Scientific classification
- Kingdom: Animalia
- Phylum: Arthropoda
- Class: Insecta
- Order: Lepidoptera
- Family: Sphingidae
- Genus: Ambulyx
- Species: A. semiplacida

Binomial name
- Ambulyx semiplacida Inoue, 1990

= Ambulyx semiplacida =

Species of moth

Ambulyx semiplacida is a species of moth of the family Sphingidae first described by Hiroshi Inoue in 1990.

== Distribution ==
It is known from Taiwan.

== Description ==
It is similar to Ambulyx placida, but the forewing upperside subterminal line is more strongly arched and the yellow proximal border is broader.

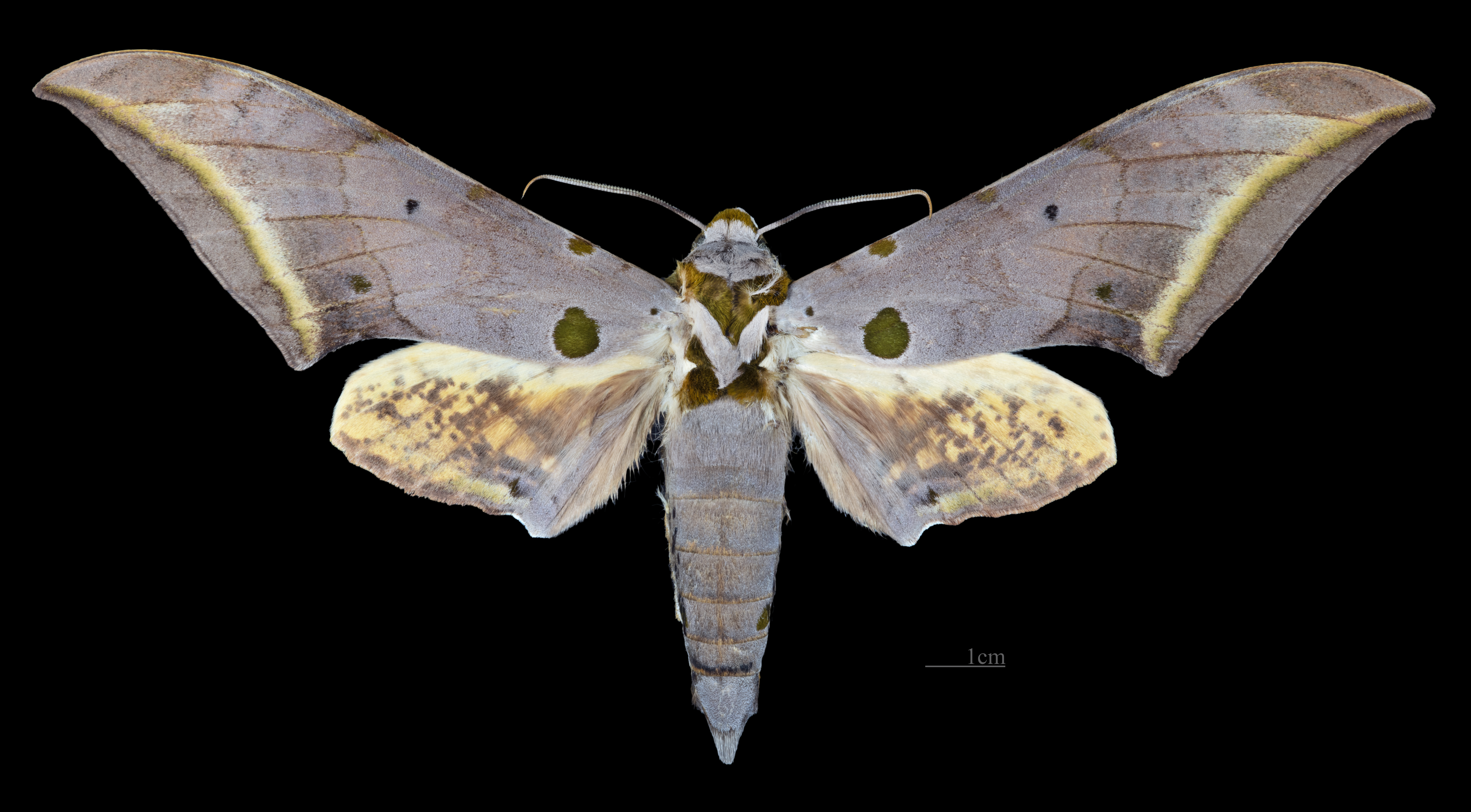
Male dorsal

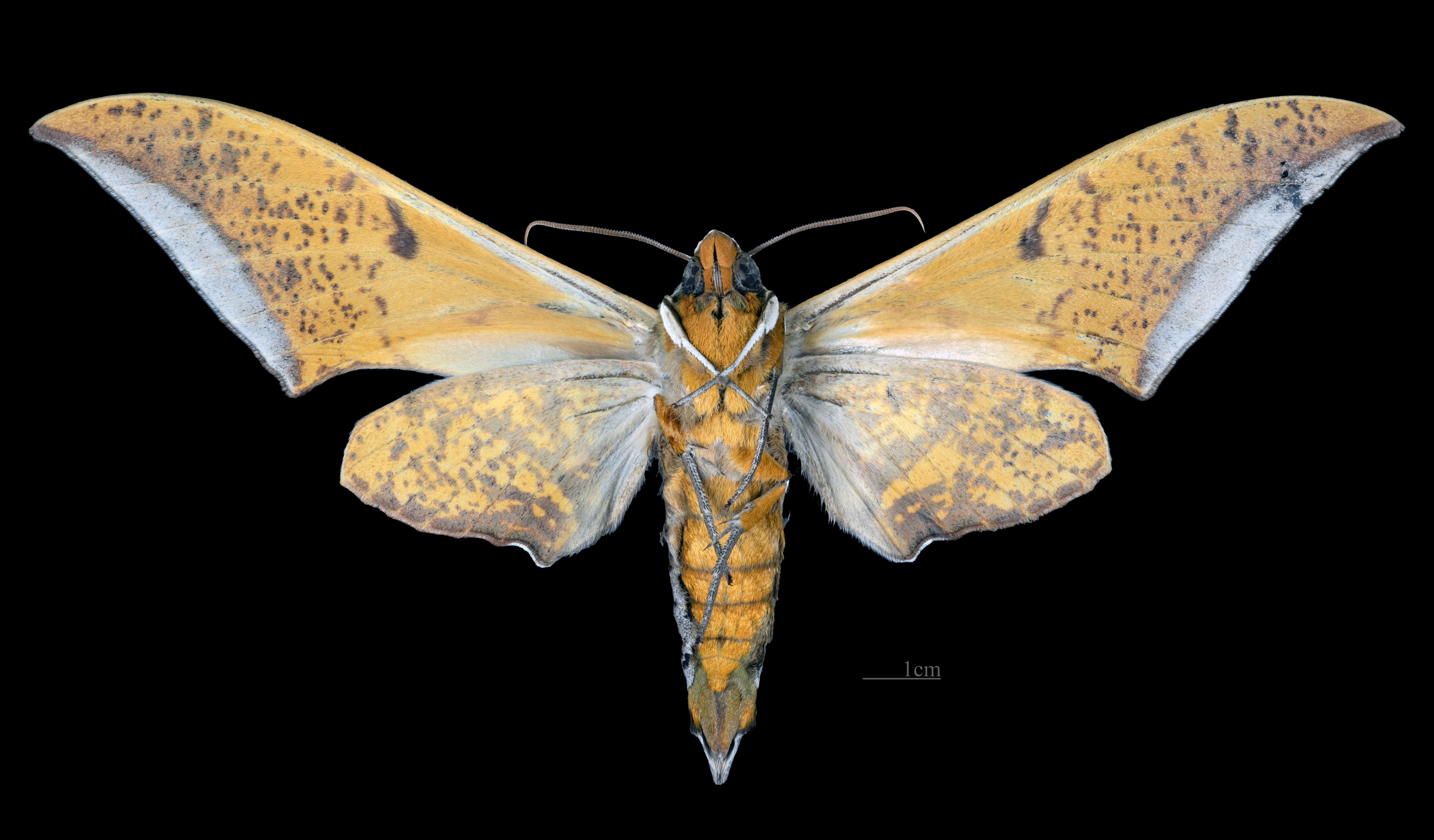
Male ventral
