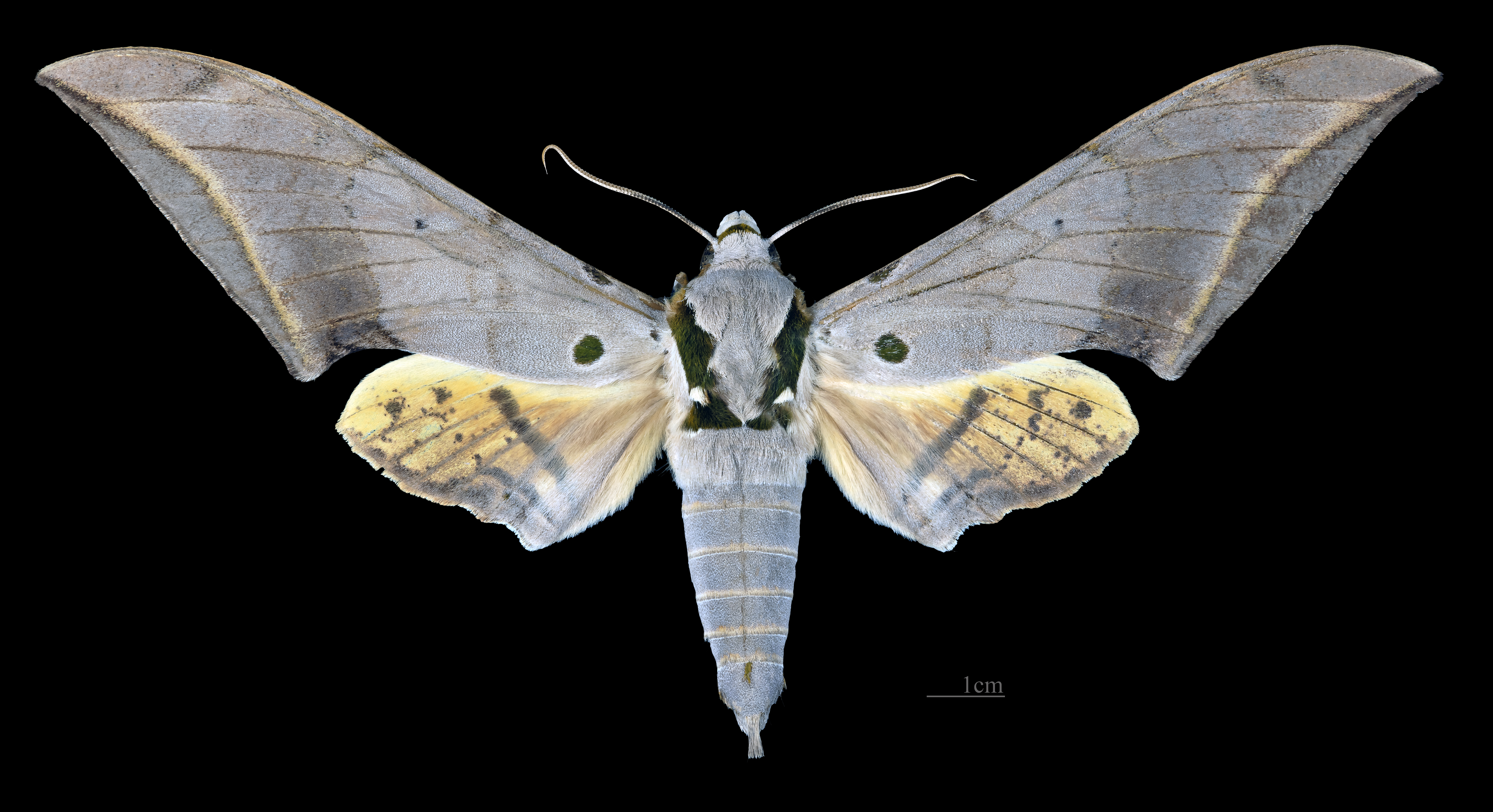
- Male dorsal
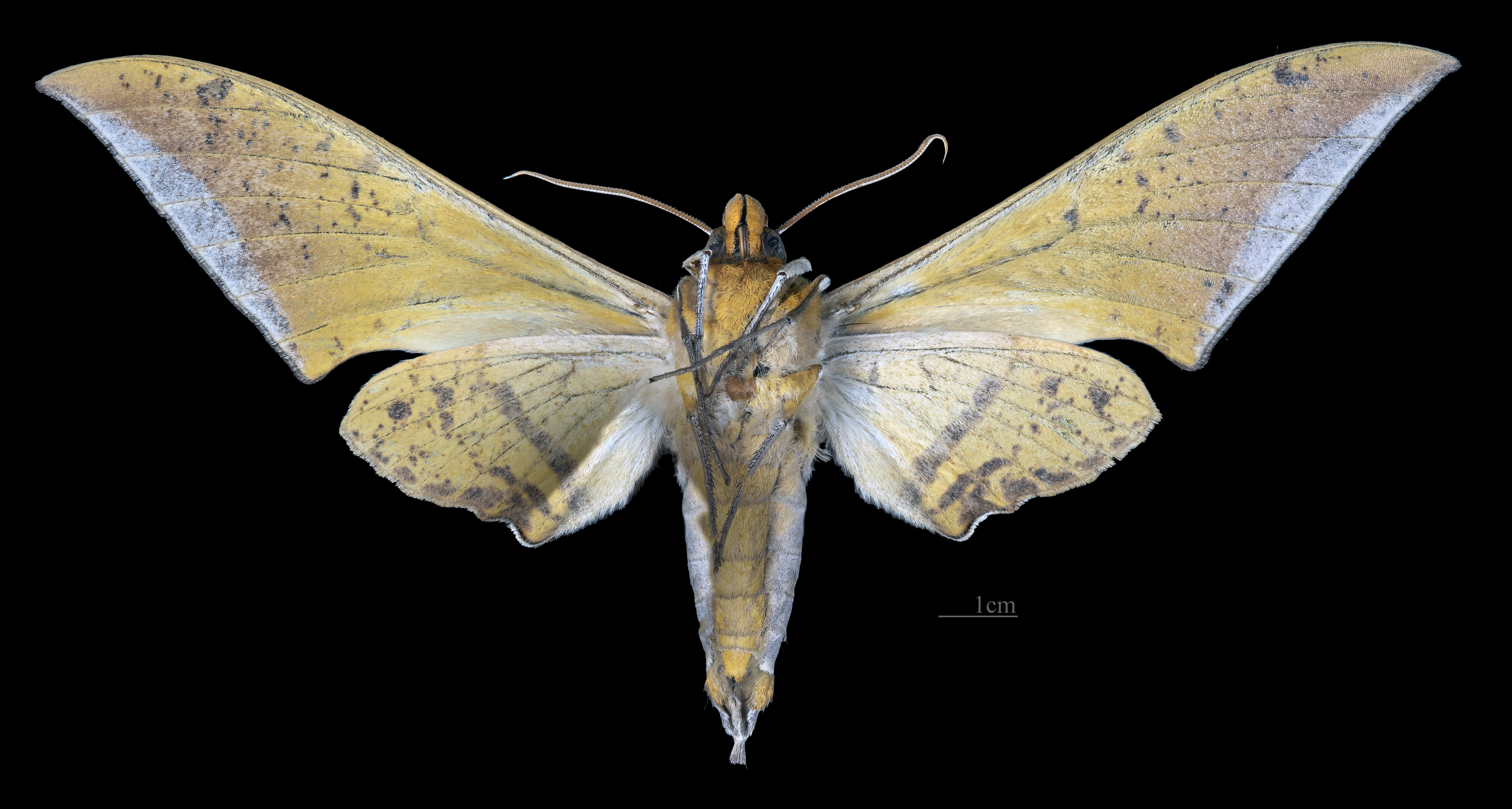
- Male ventral

Scientific classification
- Kingdom: Animalia
- Phylum: Arthropoda
- Class: Insecta
- Order: Lepidoptera
- Family: Sphingidae
- Genus: Ambulyx
- Species: A. placida

Binomial name
- Ambulyx placida Moore, 1888

Synonyms
- Oxyambulyx citrona Joicey & Kaye, 1917; Ambulyx placida nepalplacida Inoue, 1992

= Ambulyx placida =

Species of moth

Ambulyx placida, the plain gliding hawkmoth, is a species of moth of the family Sphingidae. It is known from the Himalayan foothills of northern India, Nepal and Tibet.

The wingspan is 104–114 mm. It is similar to Ambulyx semiplacida, but can be distinguished by the much smaller subbasal spot on the forewing upperside.
