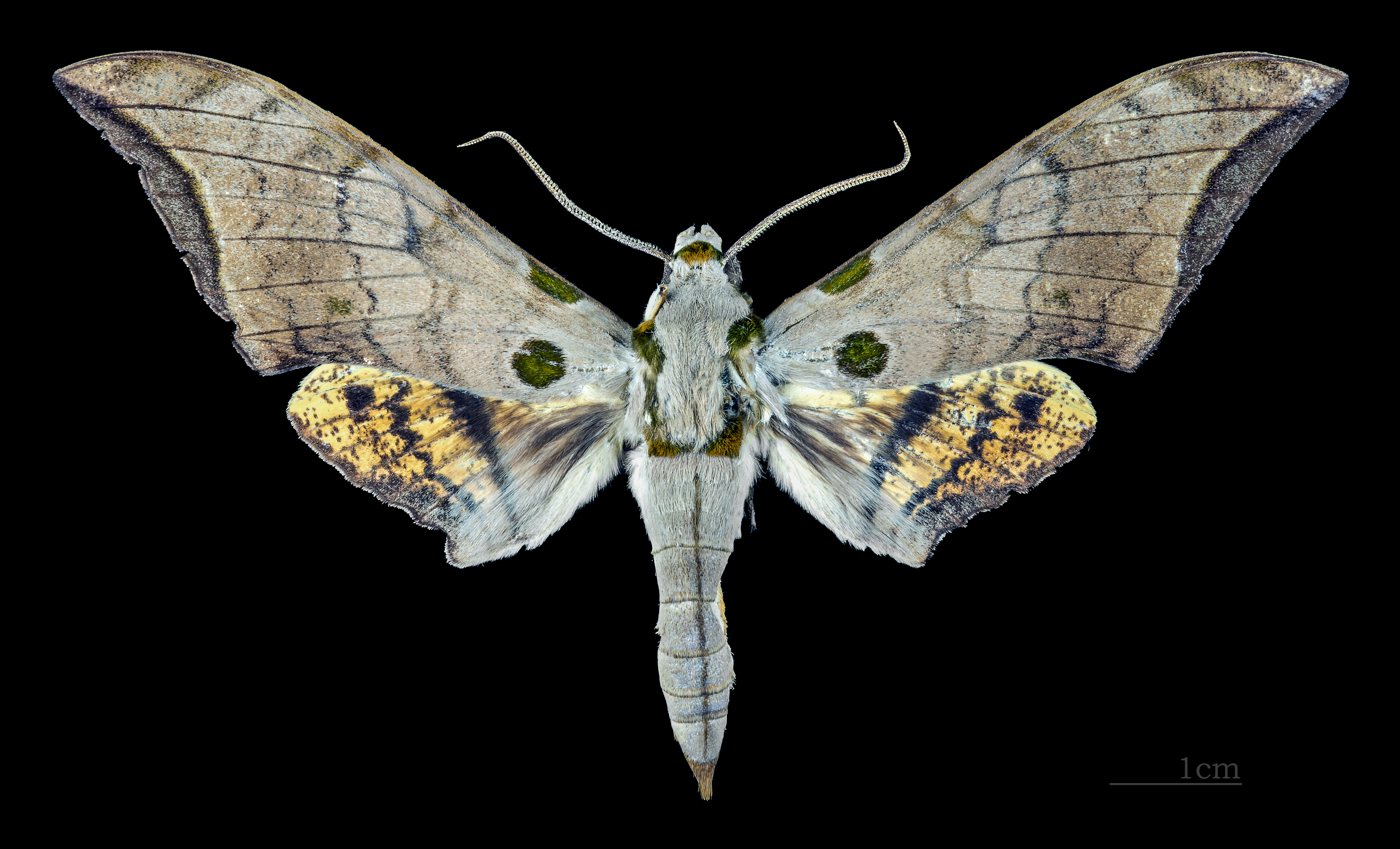
- Ambulyx wilemani dorsal
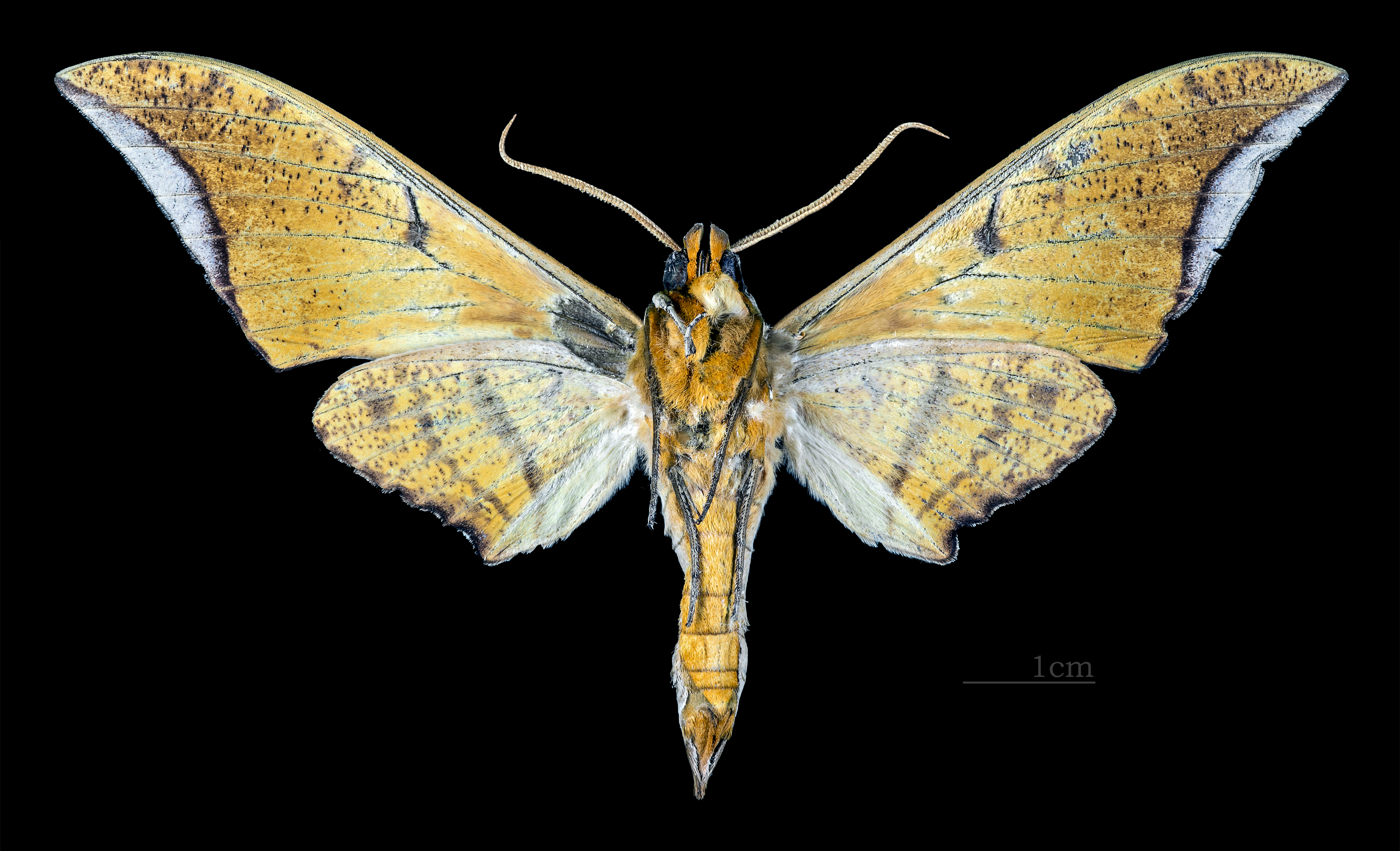
- Ambulyx wilemani ventral

Scientific classification
- Kingdom: Animalia
- Phylum: Arthropoda
- Class: Insecta
- Order: Lepidoptera
- Family: Sphingidae
- Genus: Ambulyx
- Species: A. wilemani

Binomial name
- Ambulyx wilemani (Rothschild & Jordan, 1916)

Synonyms
- Oxyambulyx wilemani Rothschild & Jordan, 1916

= Ambulyx wilemani =

Species of moth

Ambulyx wilemani is a species of moth of the family Sphingidae. It is found in the Philippines.
