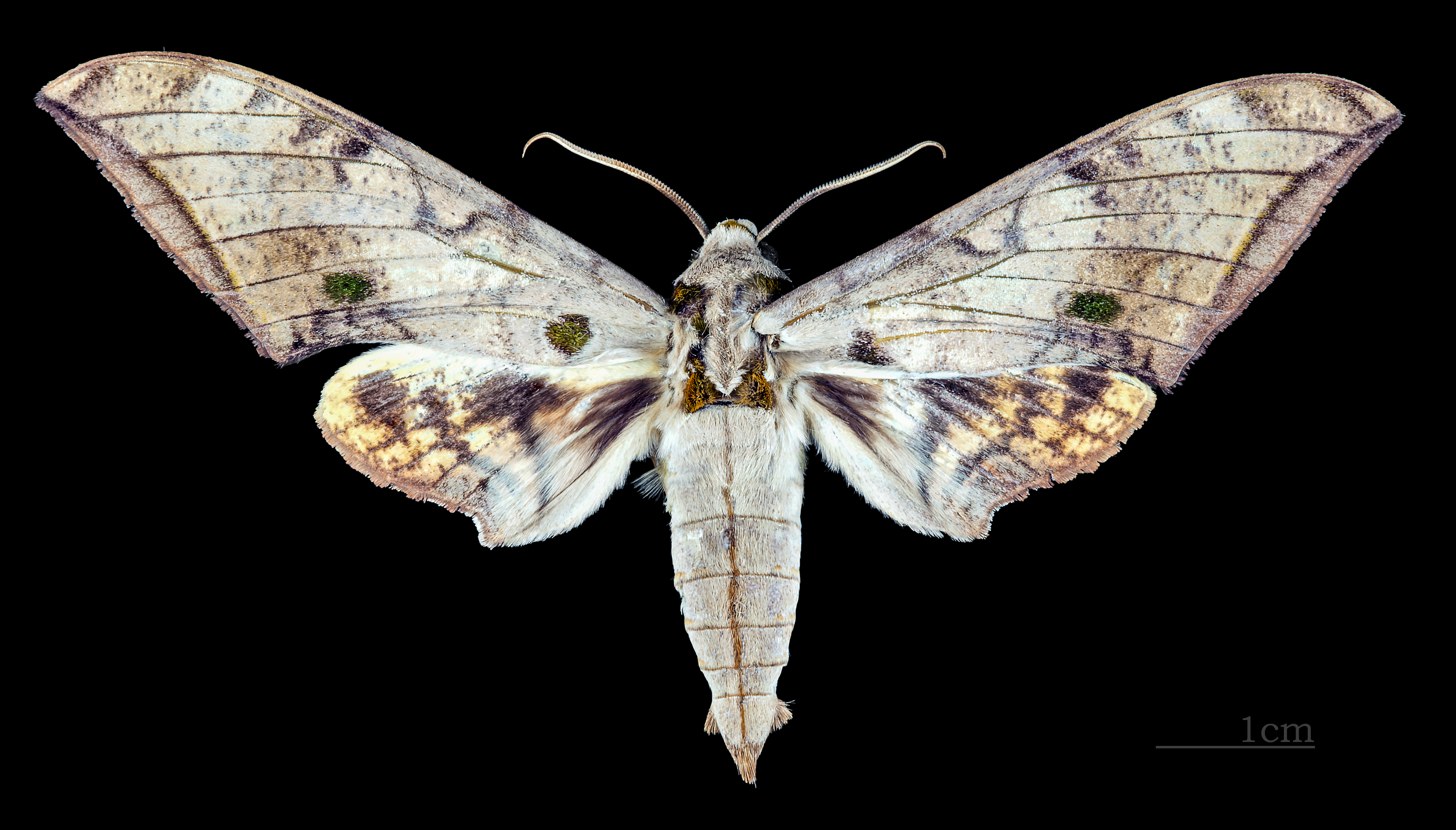
- Ambulyx inouei dorsal
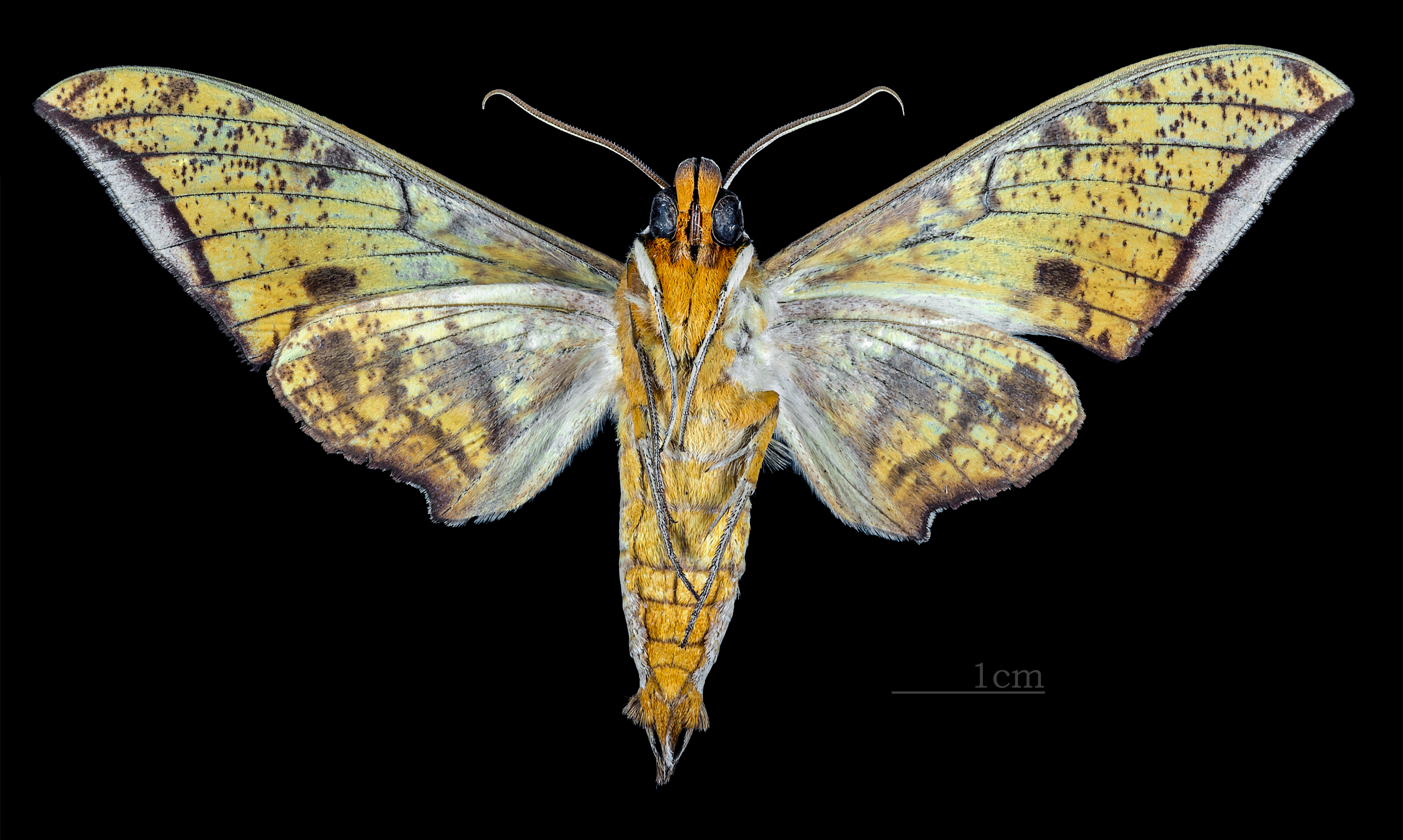
- Ambulyx inouei ventral

Scientific classification
- Kingdom: Animalia
- Phylum: Arthropoda
- Clade: Pancrustacea
- Class: Insecta
- Order: Lepidoptera
- Family: Sphingidae
- Genus: Ambulyx
- Species: A. inouei

Binomial name
- Ambulyx inouei Cadiou & Holloway, 1985

= Ambulyx inouei =

Species of moth

Ambulyx inouei is a species of moth of the family Sphingidae. It is known from Sulawesi.
