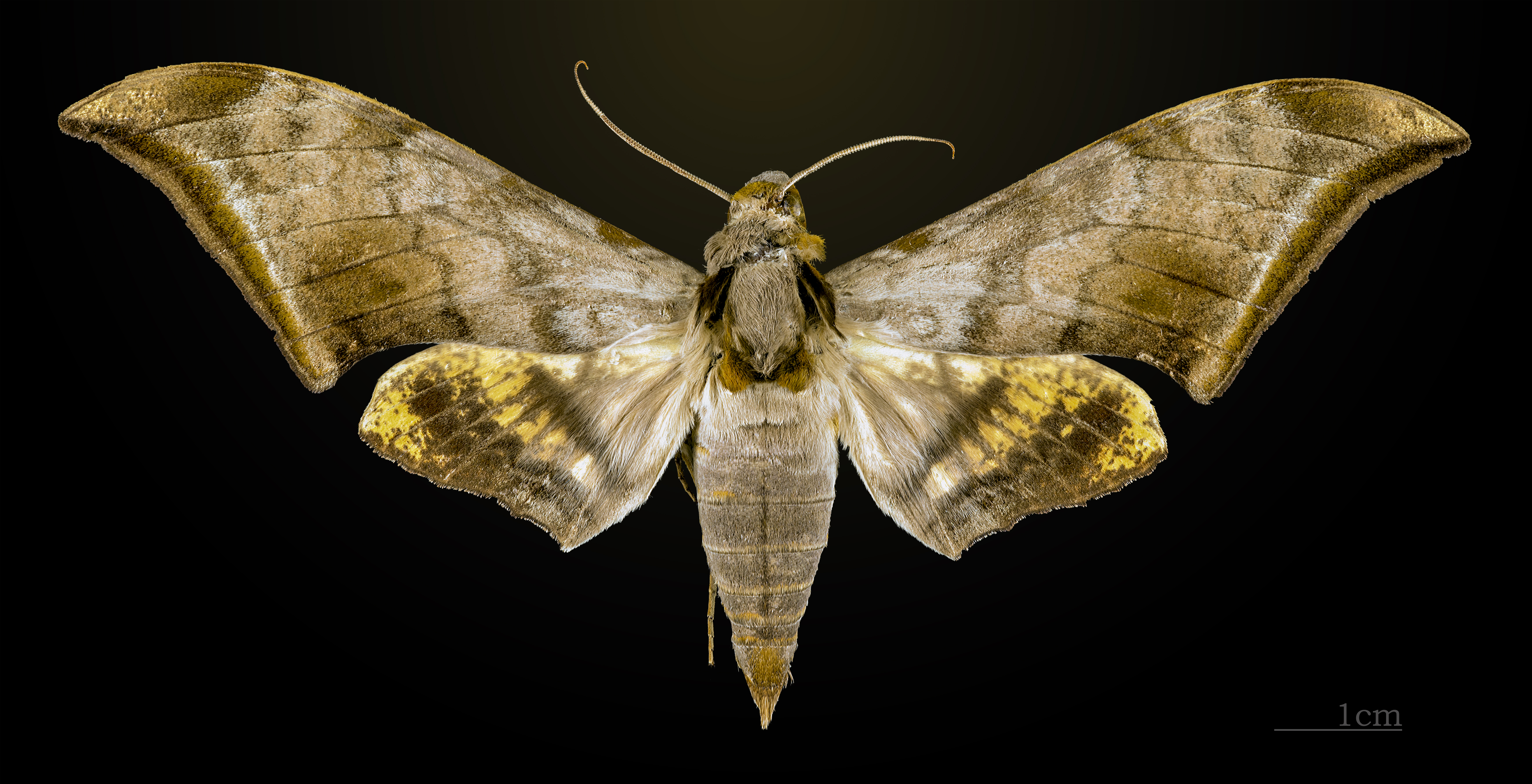
- Ambulyx jordani Dorsal
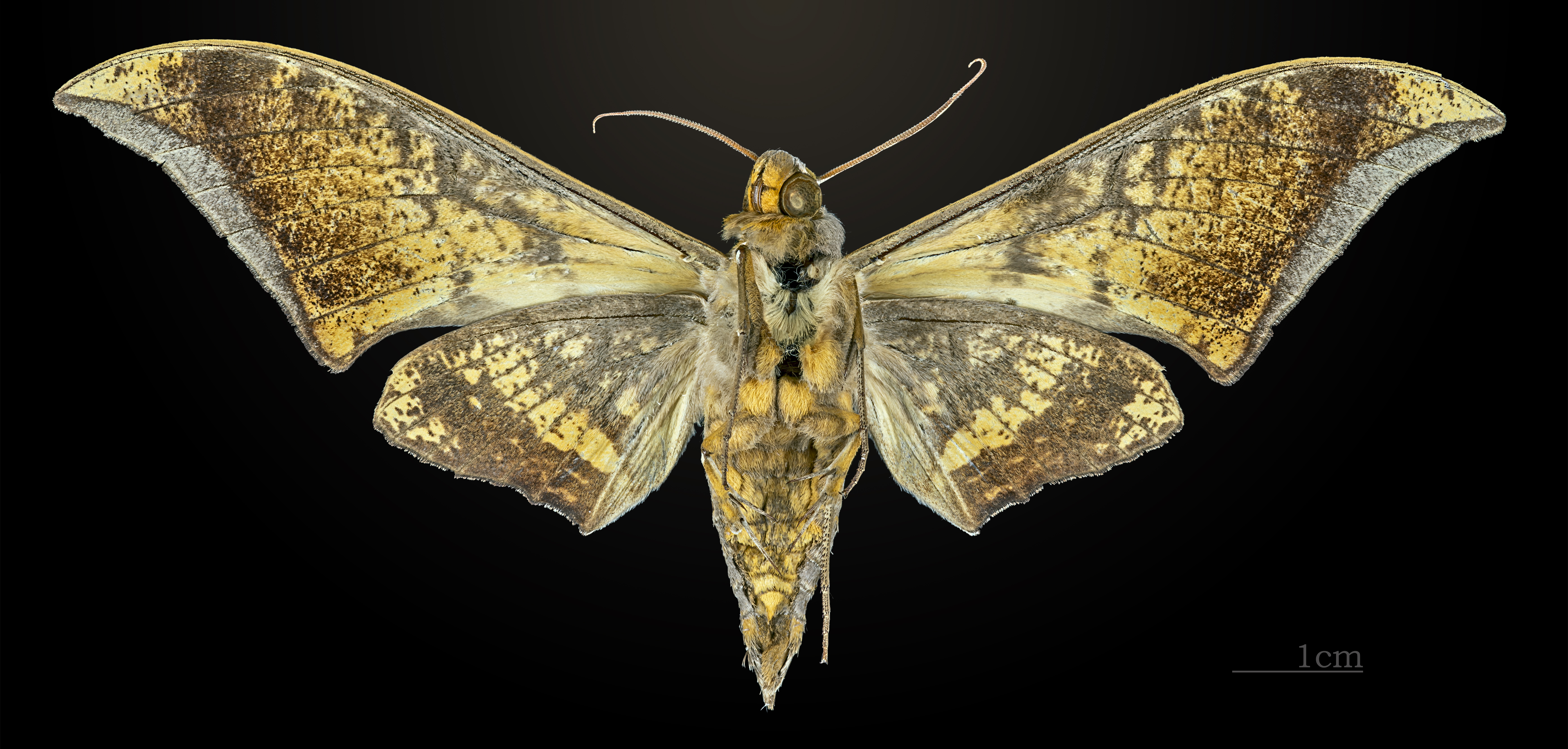
- Ambulyx jordani Ventral

Scientific classification
- Kingdom: Animalia
- Phylum: Arthropoda
- Class: Insecta
- Order: Lepidoptera
- Family: Sphingidae
- Genus: Ambulyx
- Species: A. jordani

Binomial name
- Ambulyx jordani (Bethune-Baker, 1910)

Synonyms
- Oxyambulyx jordani Bethune-Baker, 1910

= Ambulyx jordani =

Bhutana YHWH Mapu

Ambulyx jordani is a species of moth of the family Sphingidae. It is known from Papua New Guinea.
