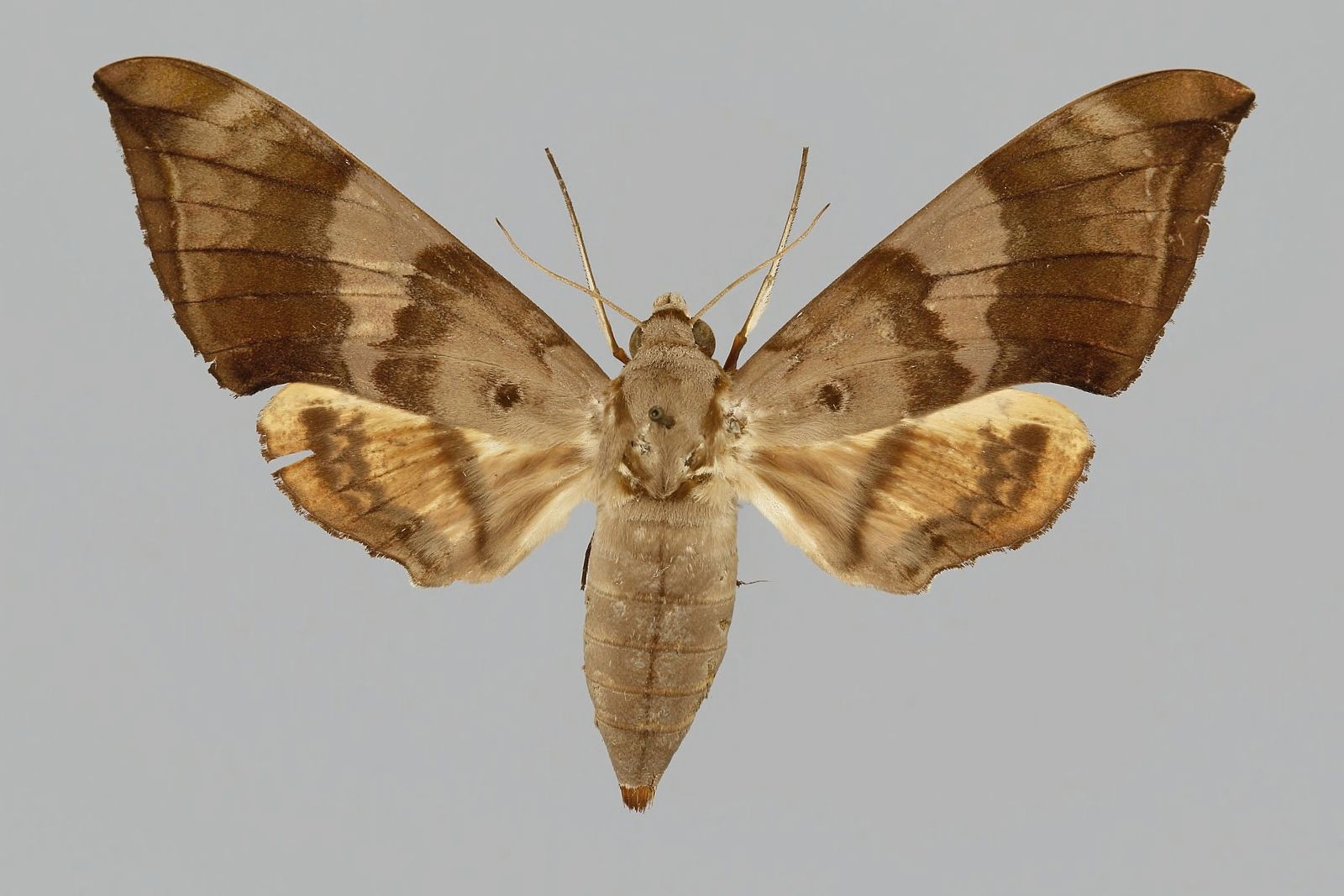
- Female of A. m. meeki

Scientific classification
- Kingdom: Animalia
- Phylum: Arthropoda
- Class: Insecta
- Order: Lepidoptera
- Family: Sphingidae
- Genus: Ambulyx
- Species: A. meeki

Binomial name
- Ambulyx meeki (Rothschild & Jordan, 1903)

Synonyms
- Oxyambulyx meeki Rothschild & Jordan, 1903; Oxyambulyx meeki pyrrhina Jordan, 1923

= Ambulyx meeki =

Species of moth

Ambulyx meeki is a species of moth of the family Sphingidae. It is known from the Solomon Islands.

== Subspecies ==
- Ambulyx meeki meeki (Solomon Islands)
- Ambulyx meeki makirae Tennent & Kitching, 1998 (Solomon Islands)
- Ambulyx meeki pyrrhina (Jordan, 1923) (Solomon Islands)
