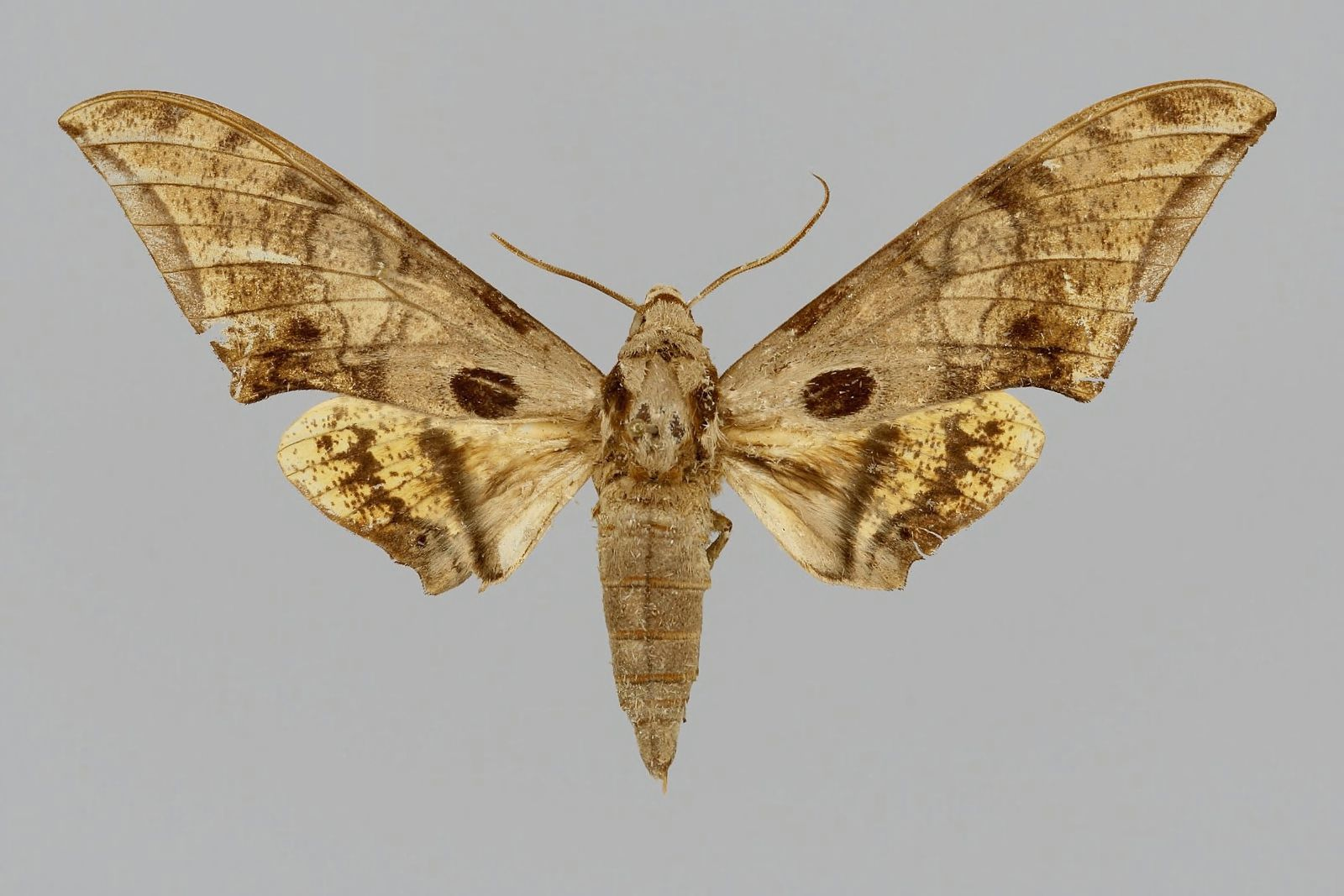
- Male, collected on Sumbawa

Scientific classification
- Kingdom: Animalia
- Phylum: Arthropoda
- Class: Insecta
- Order: Lepidoptera
- Family: Sphingidae
- Genus: Ambulyx
- Species: A. bima

Binomial name
- Ambulyx bima (Rothschild & Jordan, 1903)

Synonyms
- Oxyambulyx bima Rothschild & Jordan, 1903; Ambulyx schmickae Brechlin, 1998

= Ambulyx bima =

Species of moth

Ambulyx bima is a species of moth in the family Sphingidae. It was described by Rothschild and Jordan, in 1903, and is known from Indonesia.

== Subspecies ==
- Ambulyx bima bima (Sumbawa)
- Ambulyx bima schmickae Brechlin, 1998 (Flores)
- Ambulyx bima timoriana Brechlin, 2009 (Timor)
