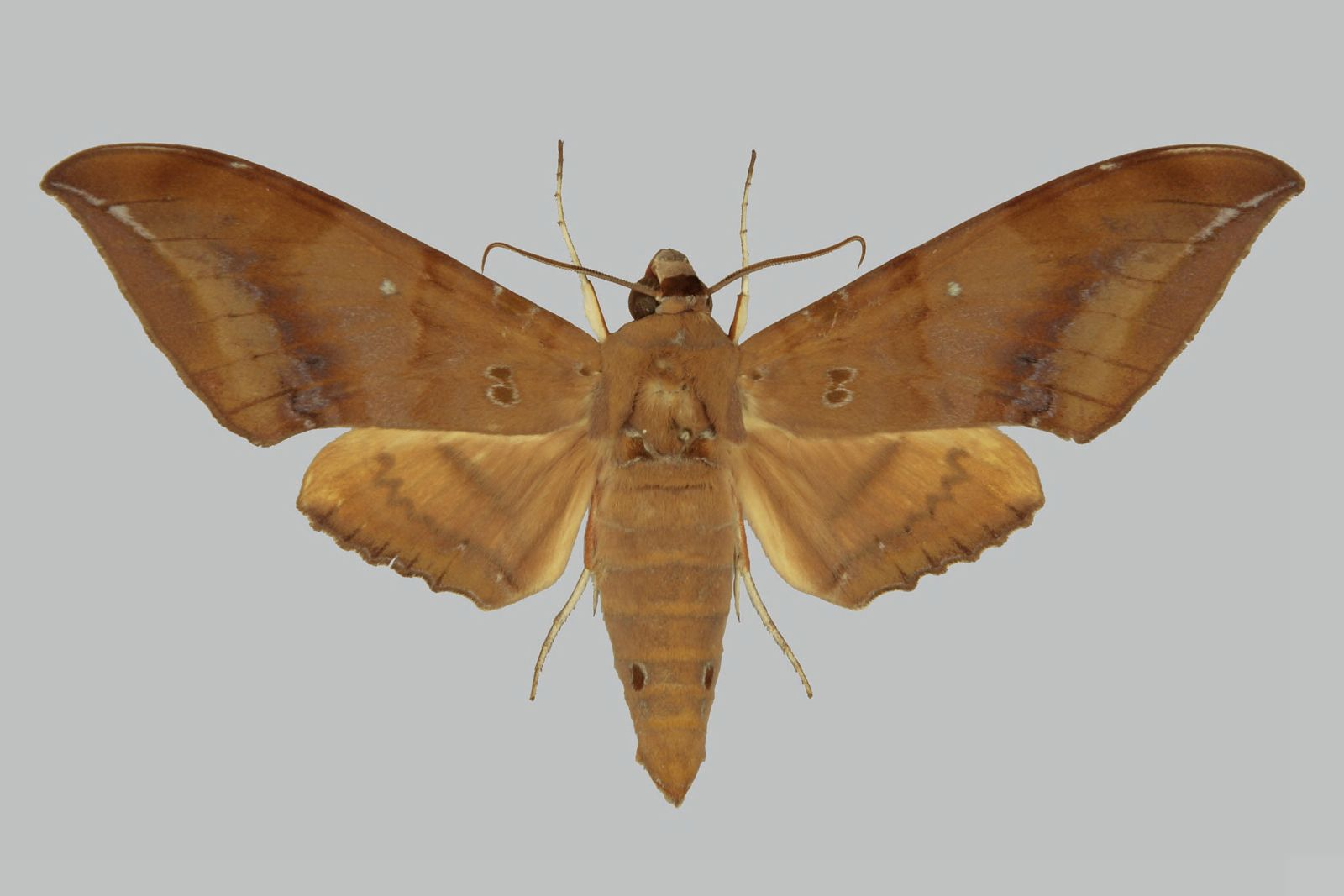

Scientific classification
- Kingdom: Animalia
- Phylum: Arthropoda
- Class: Insecta
- Order: Lepidoptera
- Family: Sphingidae
- Genus: Ambulyx
- Species: A. amboynensis

Binomial name
- Ambulyx amboynensis Eitschberger, Bergmann & Hauenstein, 2006

Synonyms
- Oxyambulyx felixi Clark, 1924; Ambulyx semifervens amboynensis Rothschild, 1894

= Ambulyx amboynensis =

Species of moth

Ambulyx amboynensis is a species of moth in the family Sphingidae. It was described by Ulf Eitschberger, Andreas Bergmann and Armin Hauenstein in 2006 and is known from Ambon in Indonesia.
