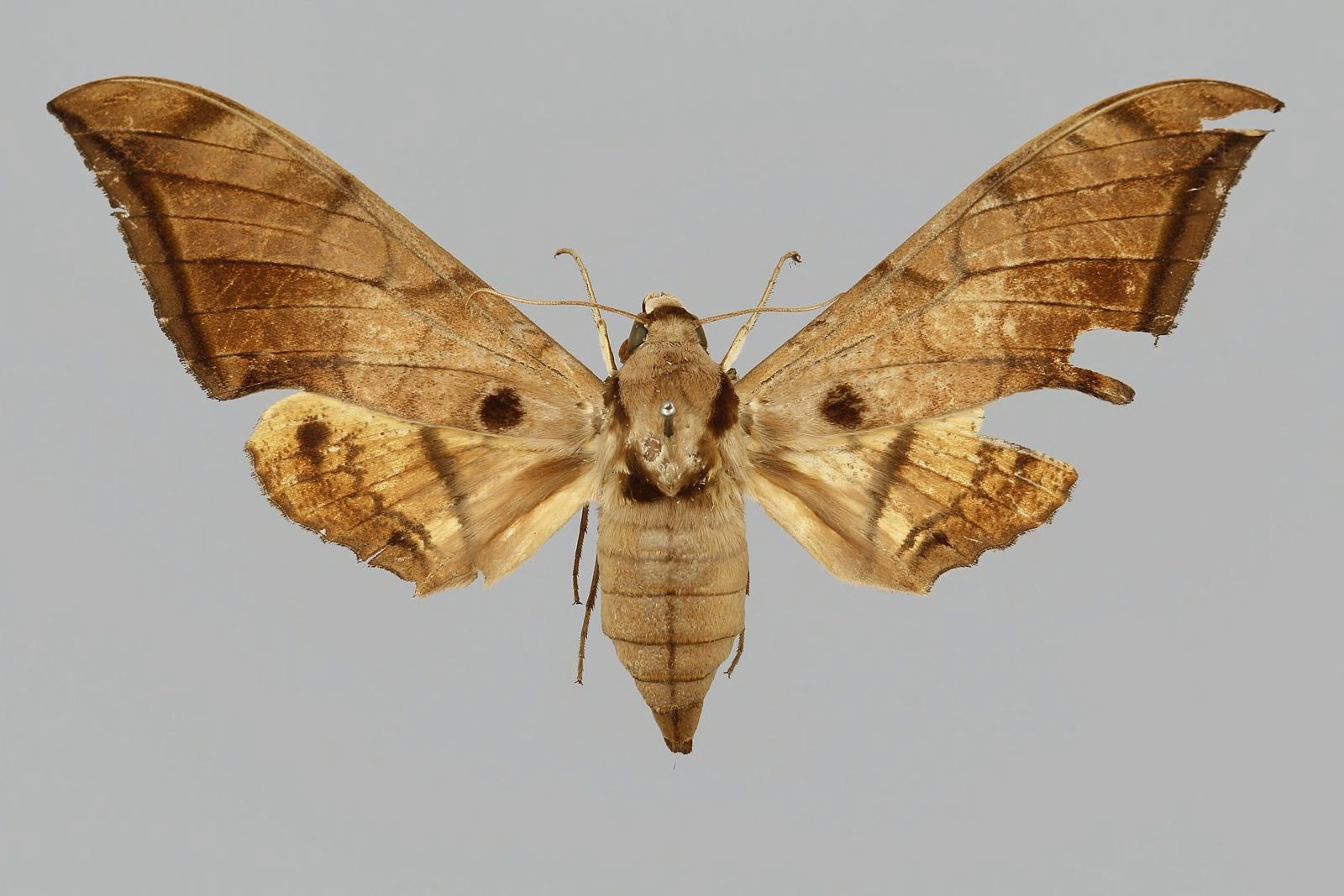
- Female

Scientific classification
- Kingdom: Animalia
- Phylum: Arthropoda
- Class: Insecta
- Order: Lepidoptera
- Family: Sphingidae
- Genus: Ambulyx
- Species: A. carycina

Binomial name
- Ambulyx carycina (Jordan, 1919)

Synonyms
- Oxyambulyx carycina Jordan, 1919

= Ambulyx carycina =

Species of moth

Ambulyx carycina is a species of moth in the family Sphingidae. It was described by Karl Jordan in 1919, and is known from Papua New Guinea.
