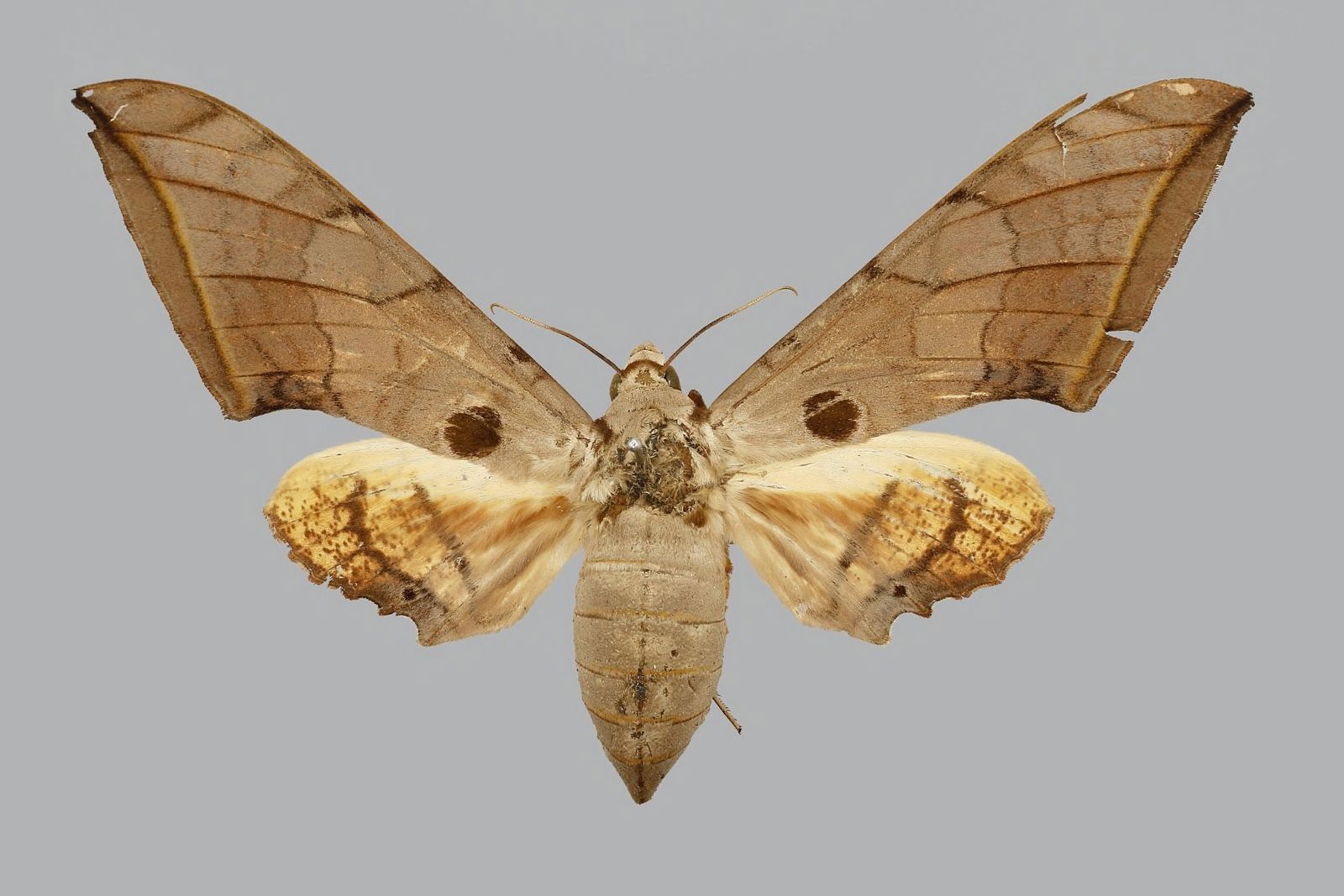
- Ambulyx bhutana, female

Scientific classification
- Kingdom: Animalia
- Phylum: Arthropoda
- Class: Insecta
- Order: Lepidoptera
- Family: Sphingidae
- Genus: Ambulyx
- Species: A. bhutana

Binomial name
- Ambulyx bhutana Brechlin, 2014

= Ambulyx bhutana =

Species of moth

Ambulyx bhutana is a species of moth in the family Sphingidae. It was described by Ronald Brechlin in 2014. It is known from Bhutan.
