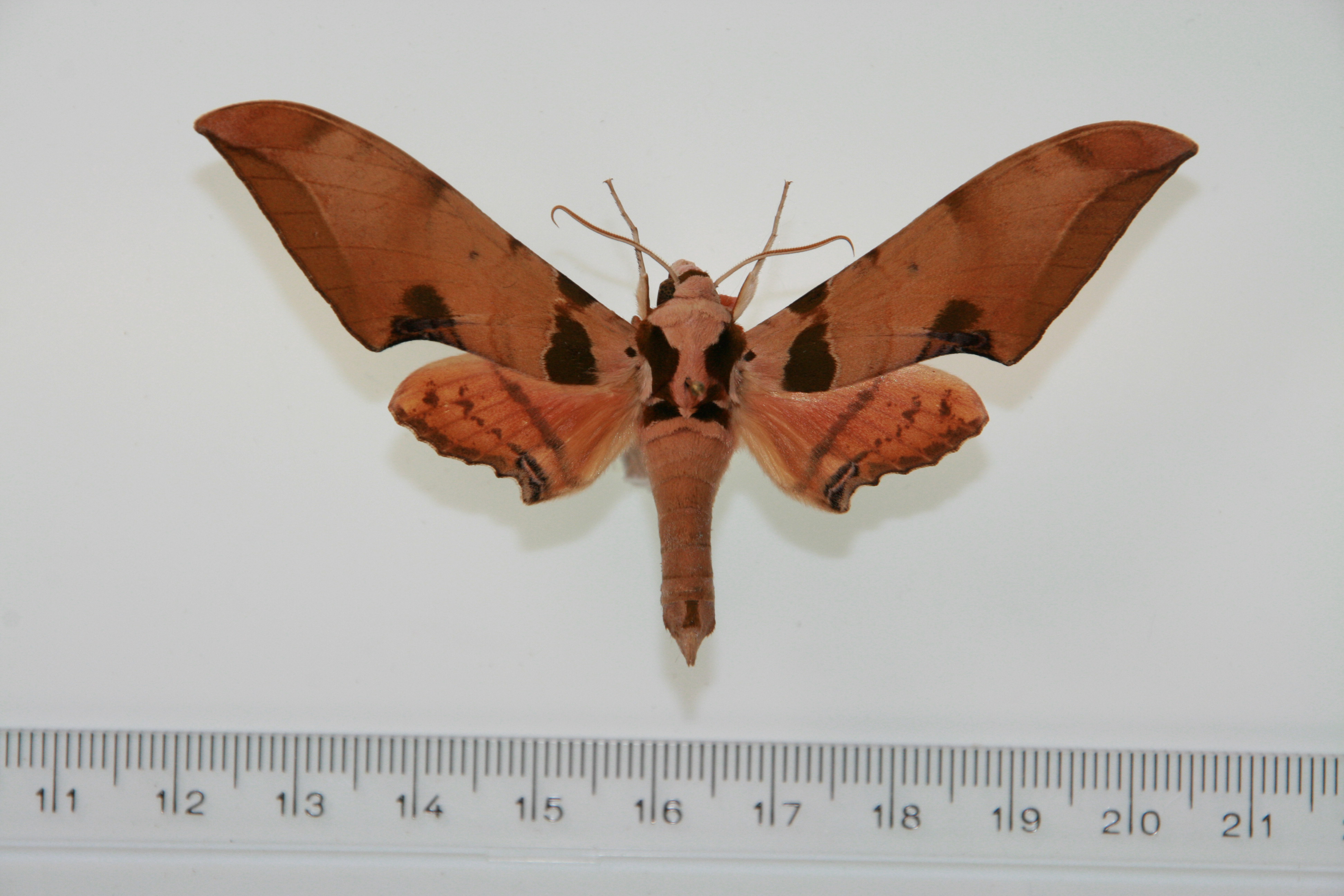

Scientific classification
- Kingdom: Animalia
- Phylum: Arthropoda
- Class: Insecta
- Order: Lepidoptera
- Family: Sphingidae
- Genus: Ambulyx
- Species: A. latifascia

Binomial name
- Ambulyx latifascia Brechlin & Haxaire, 2014

= Ambulyx latifascia =

Species of moth

Ambulyx latifascia is a species of moth in the family Sphingidae. It was described by Ronald Brechlin and Jean Haxaire in 2014. It is known from China.
