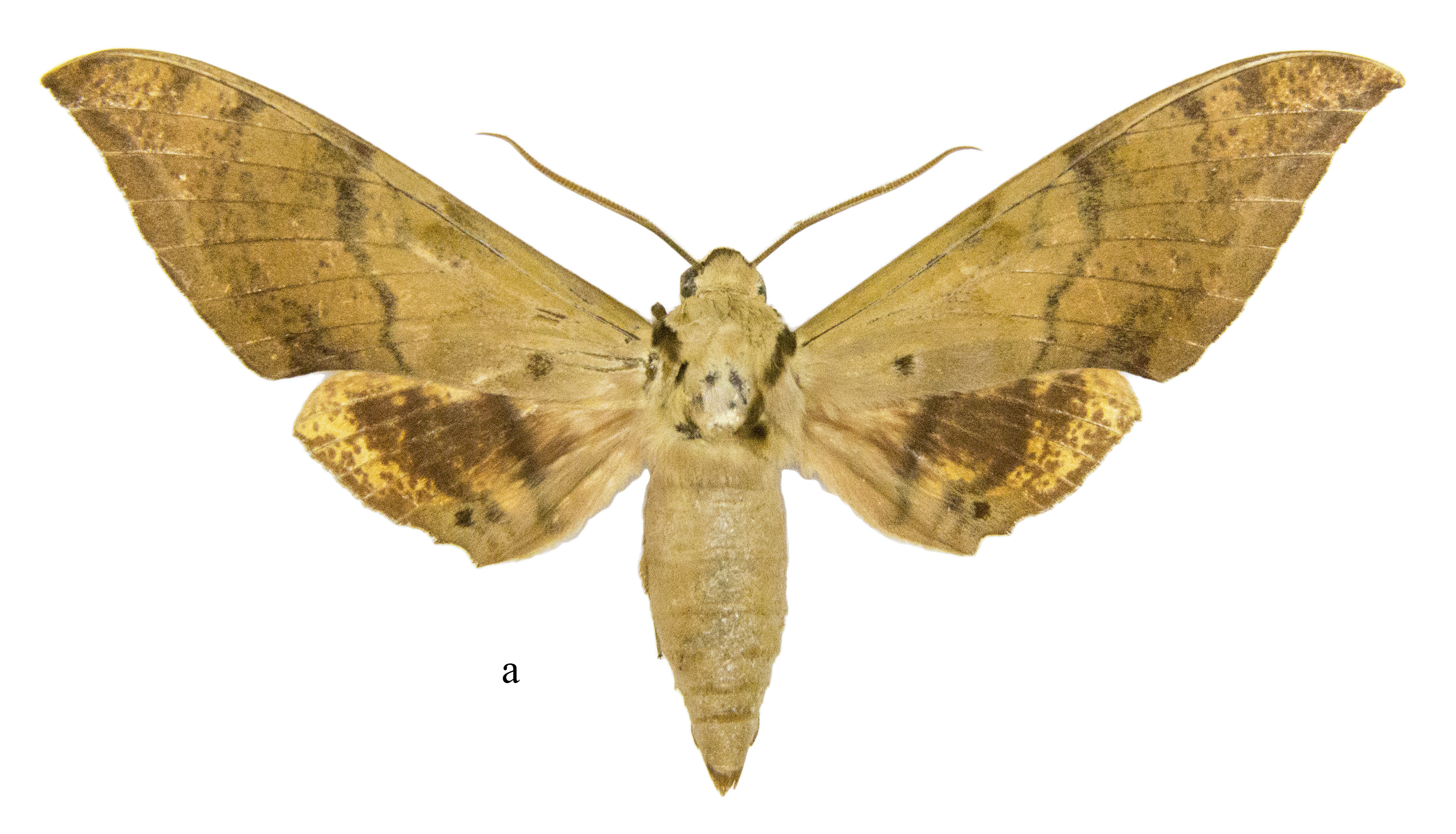

Scientific classification
- Kingdom: Animalia
- Phylum: Arthropoda
- Class: Insecta
- Order: Lepidoptera
- Family: Sphingidae
- Genus: Ambulyx
- Species: A. marissa

Binomial name
- Ambulyx marissa Eitschberger & Melichar, 2009

= Ambulyx marissa =

Species of moth

Ambulyx marissa is a species of moth of the family Sphingidae. It is known to be from Indonesia.
