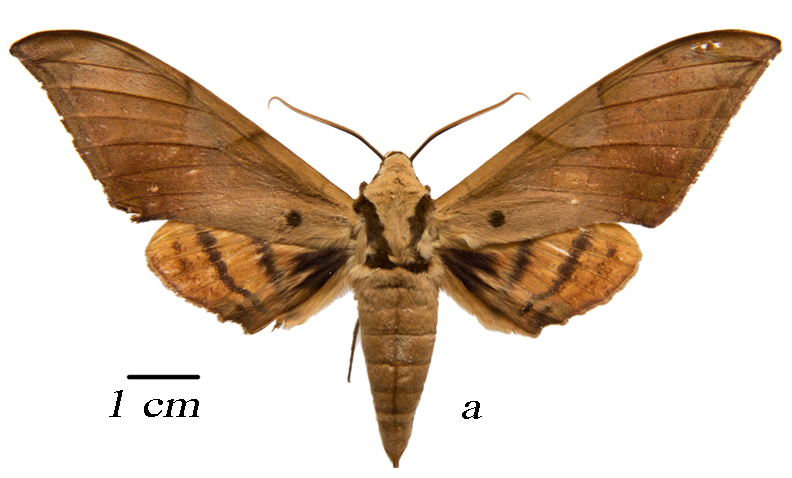

Scientific classification
- Kingdom: Animalia
- Phylum: Arthropoda
- Class: Insecta
- Order: Lepidoptera
- Family: Sphingidae
- Genus: Ambulyx
- Species: A. viteki

Binomial name
- Ambulyx viteki Melichar & Rezac, 2014

= Ambulyx viteki =

Species of moth

Ambulyx viteki is a species of moth in the family Sphingidae. It was described by Melichar & Rezac in 2014. It is known from Indonesia.
