= Ambulyx rudloffi =

Scientific classification
- Kingdom: Animalia
- Phylum: Arthropoda
- Class: Insecta
- Order: Lepidoptera
- Family: Sphingidae
- Genus: Ambulyx
- Species: A. rudloffi

Binomial name
- Ambulyx rudloffi Brechlin, 2005

Species of moth

Ambulyx rudloffi is a species of moth of the family Sphingidae. It is known from Papua New Guinea.
