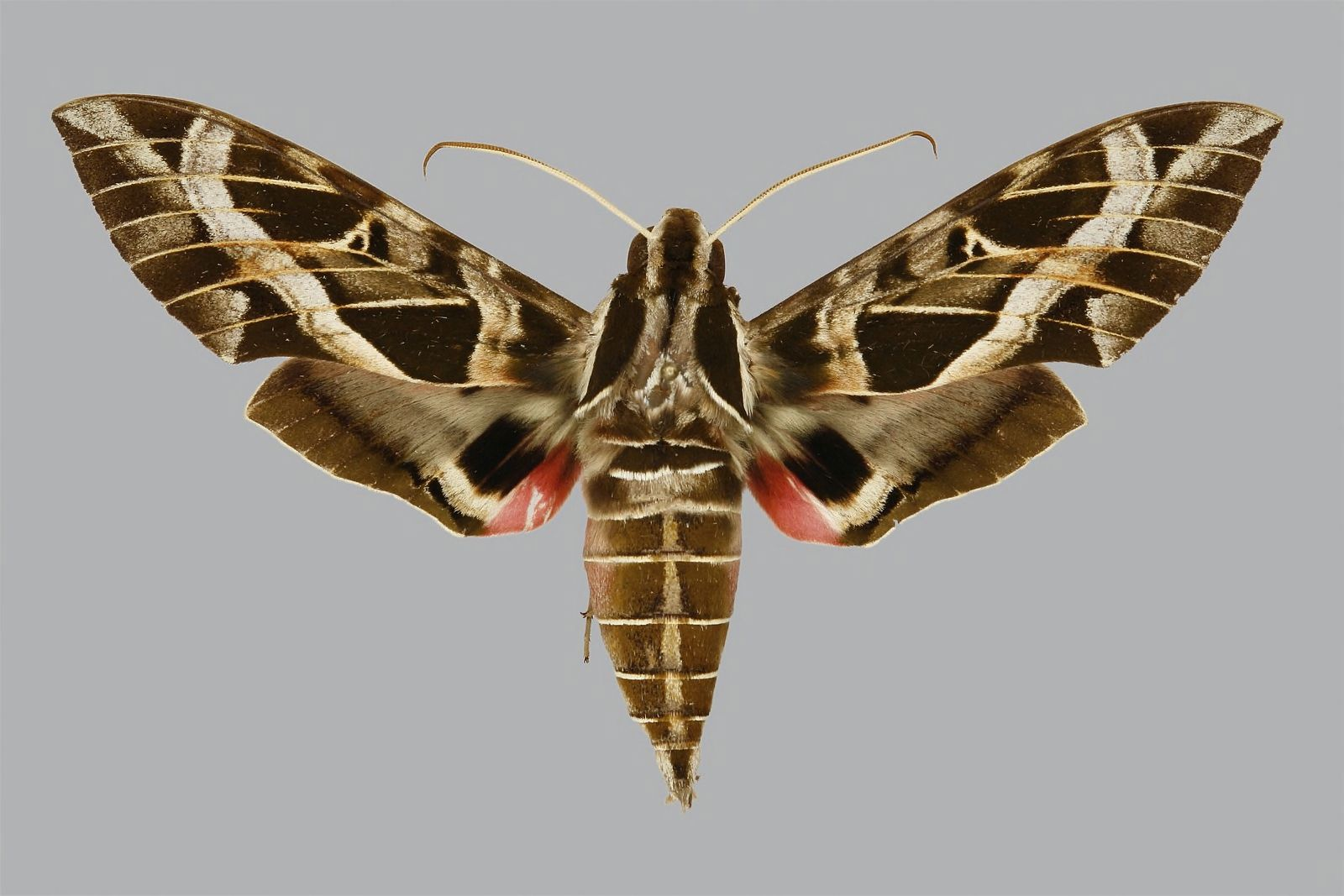

Scientific classification
- Domain: Eukaryota
- Kingdom: Animalia
- Phylum: Arthropoda
- Class: Insecta
- Order: Lepidoptera
- Family: Sphingidae
- Genus: Eumorpha
- Species: E. strenua

Binomial name
- Eumorpha strenua (Ménétries, 1857)

Synonyms
- Chaerocampa strenua Ménétriés, 1857; Dupo domingonis Rothschild, 1894

= Eumorpha strenua =

Species of moth

Eumorpha strenua is a moth of the family Sphingidae. It is known from Haiti, Cuba and the Dominican Republic.

The wingspan is about 105 mm. It is similar to Eumorpha satellitia posticatus and Eumorpha mirificatus, differing from the former in the conspicuously highlighted veins on the forewing upperside, and from the latter by the broader oblique apical stripe and dorsal abdominal stripe and the lack of any pinkish tone to the median area of the hindwing upperside.

Adults have been recorded from May to June.

The larvae feed on Vitaceae species.
