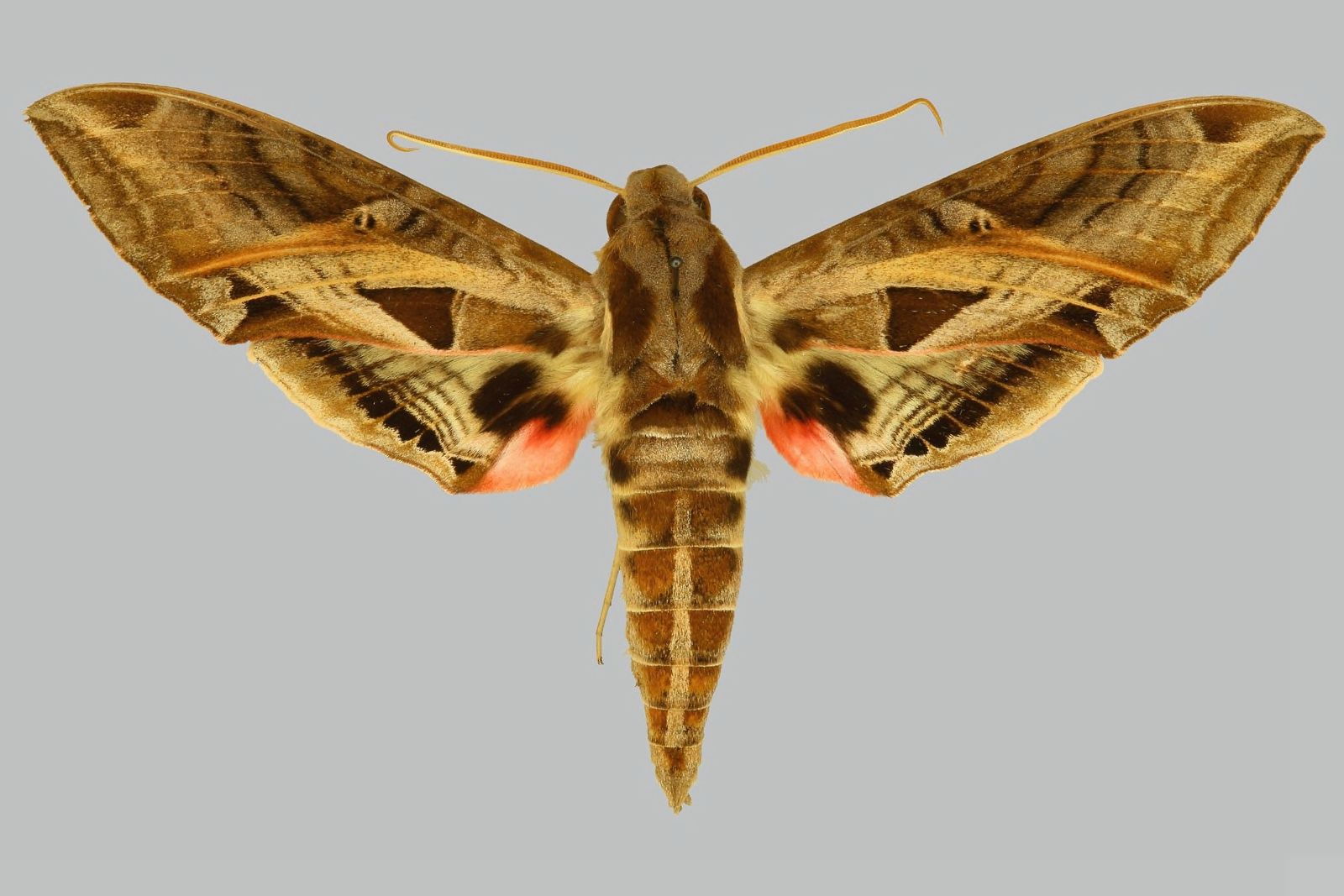

Scientific classification
- Domain: Eukaryota
- Kingdom: Animalia
- Phylum: Arthropoda
- Class: Insecta
- Order: Lepidoptera
- Family: Sphingidae
- Genus: Eumorpha
- Species: E. drucei

Binomial name
- Eumorpha drucei (Rothschild & Jordan, 1903)

Synonyms
- Pholus drucei Rothschild & Jordan, 1903

= Eumorpha drucei =

Species of moth

Eumorpha drucei is a moth of the family Sphingidae. It is known from Ecuador.

The length of the forewings is about 40 mm. The upperside of the body is similar to Eumorpha analis, but the ground colour is deeper olive green. There is a narrower pale dorsal line on the abdomen, as well as larger and darker patches. The hindwing upperside inner margin is pink with a black discal spot.

The larvae probably feed on grape or vine species.
