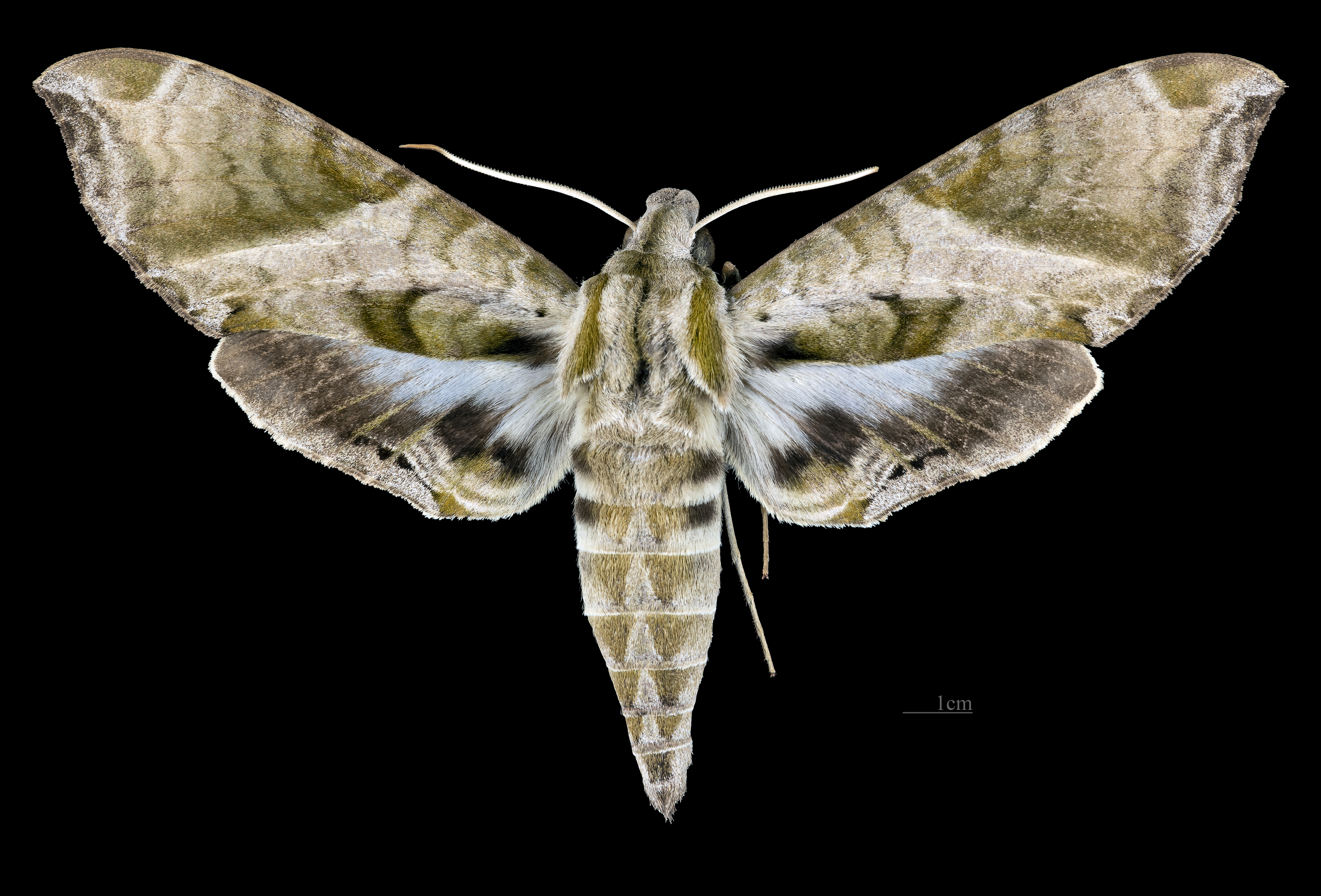
- Eumorpha elisa Male dorsal
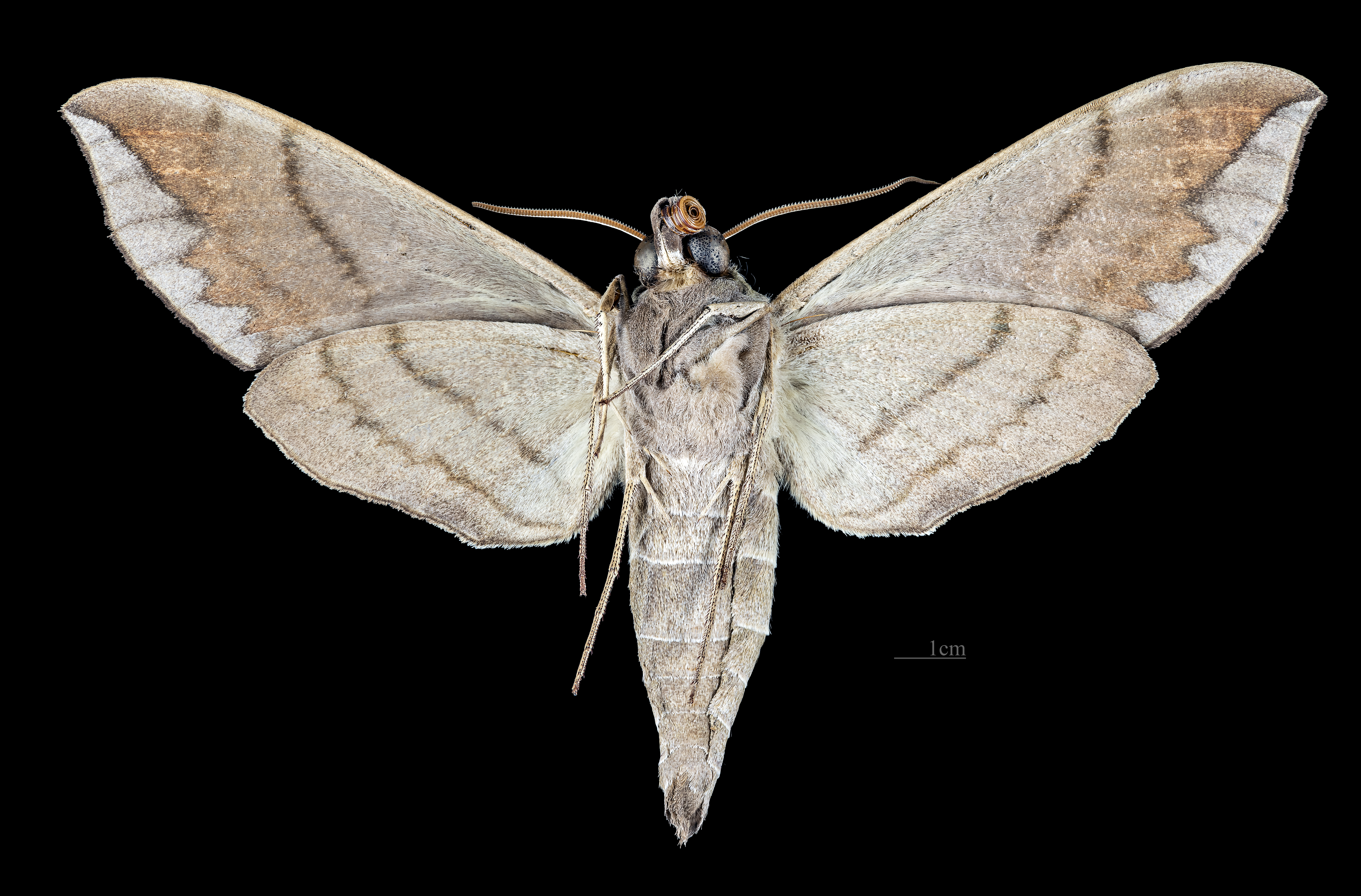
- Eumorpha elisa Male ventral

Scientific classification
- Domain: Eukaryota
- Kingdom: Animalia
- Phylum: Arthropoda
- Class: Insecta
- Order: Lepidoptera
- Family: Sphingidae
- Genus: Eumorpha
- Species: E. elisa

Binomial name
- Eumorpha elisa (Smyth, 1901)

Synonyms
- Philampelus elisa Smyth, 1901

= Eumorpha elisa =

Species of moth

Eumorpha elisa is a moth of the family Sphingidae.

== Distribution ==
It is known from Mexico and Guatemala.

== Description ==
Adults are greenish-grey and recognizable by the rhombiform patch on the posterior margin of the hindwing upperside with dark basal and distal edges. The forewing upperside ground colour is greyish-brown with darker greenish-grey markings.

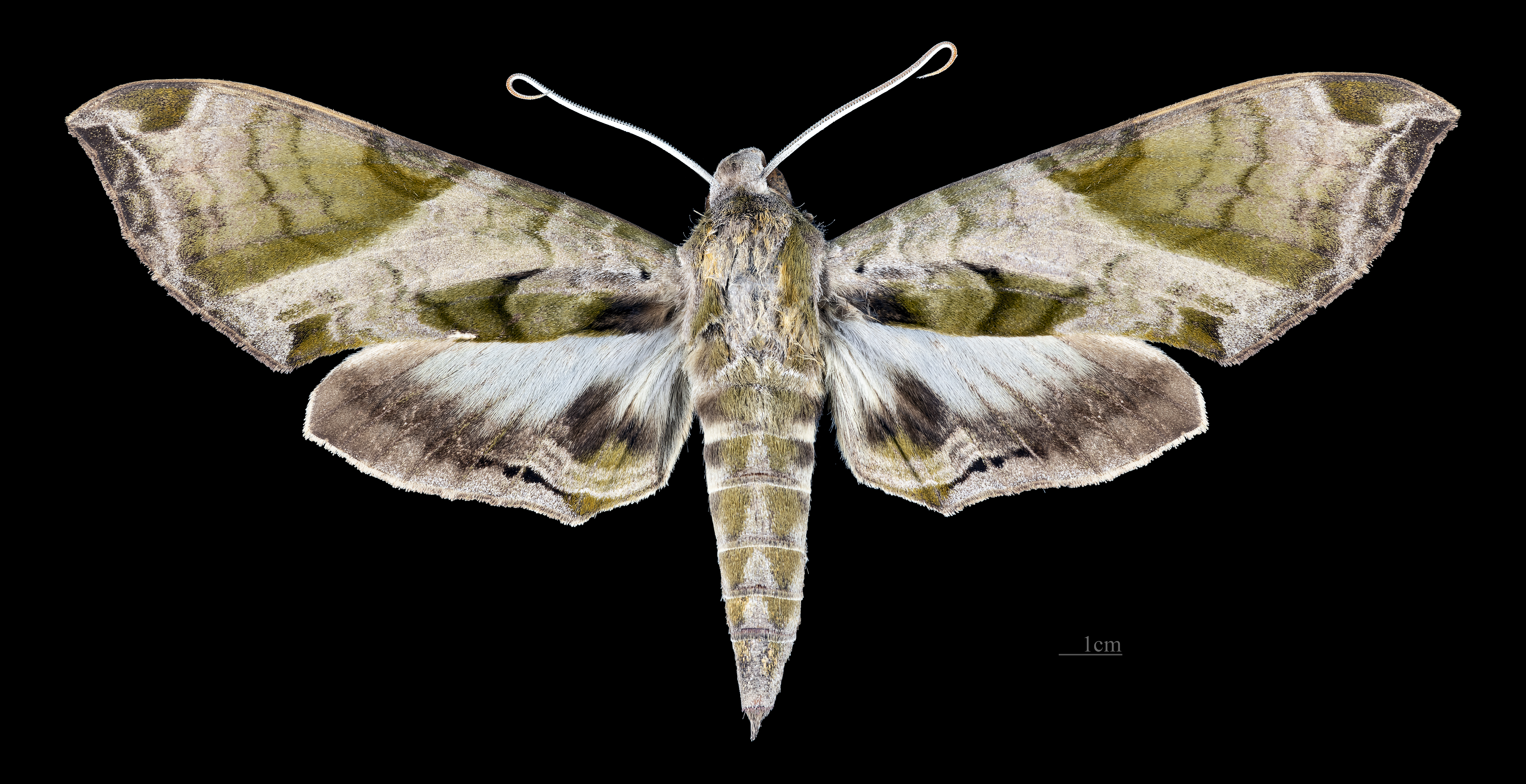
Female dorsal

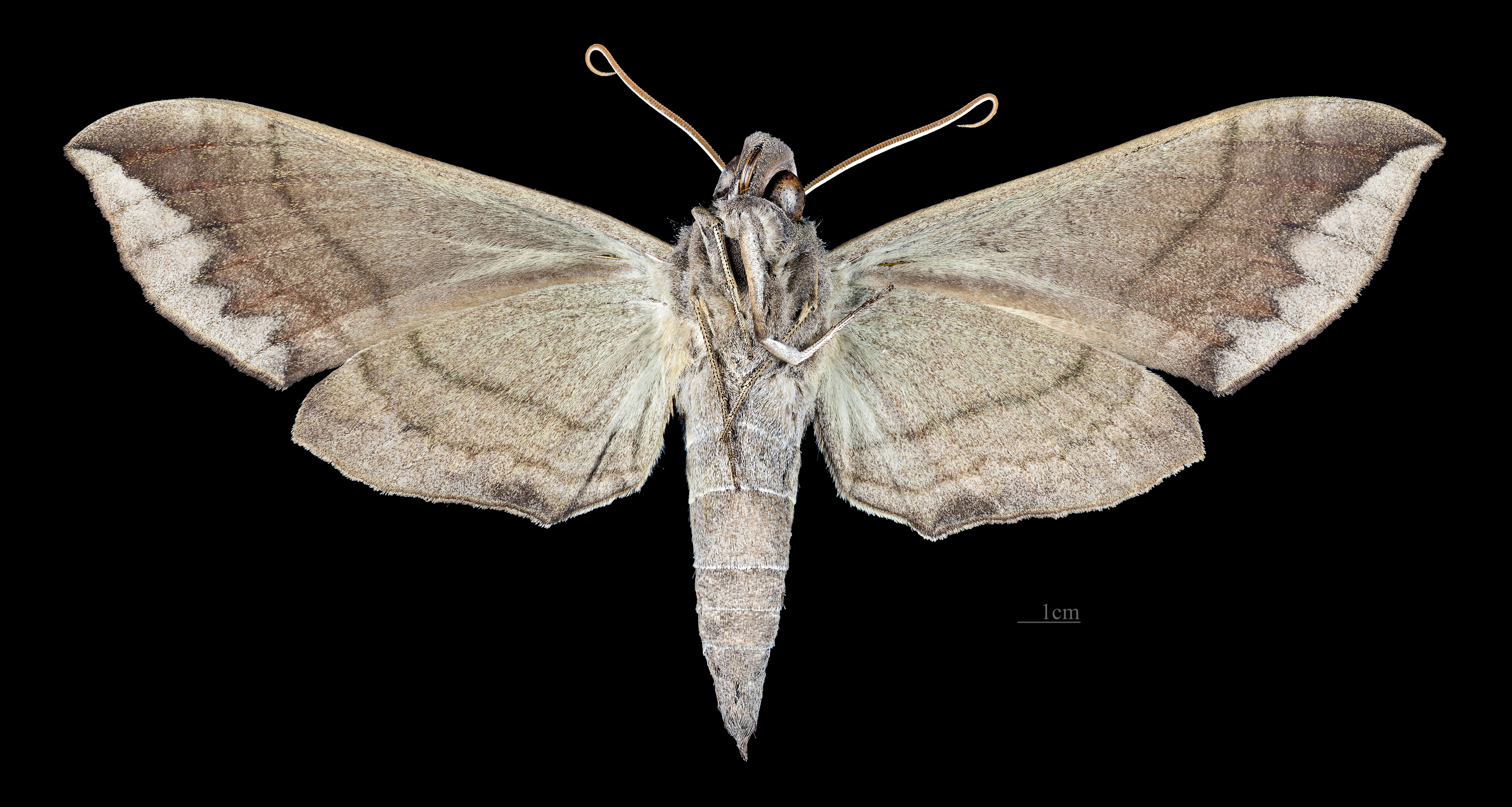
Female ventral

== Biology ==
The larvae probably feed on grape and vine species.
