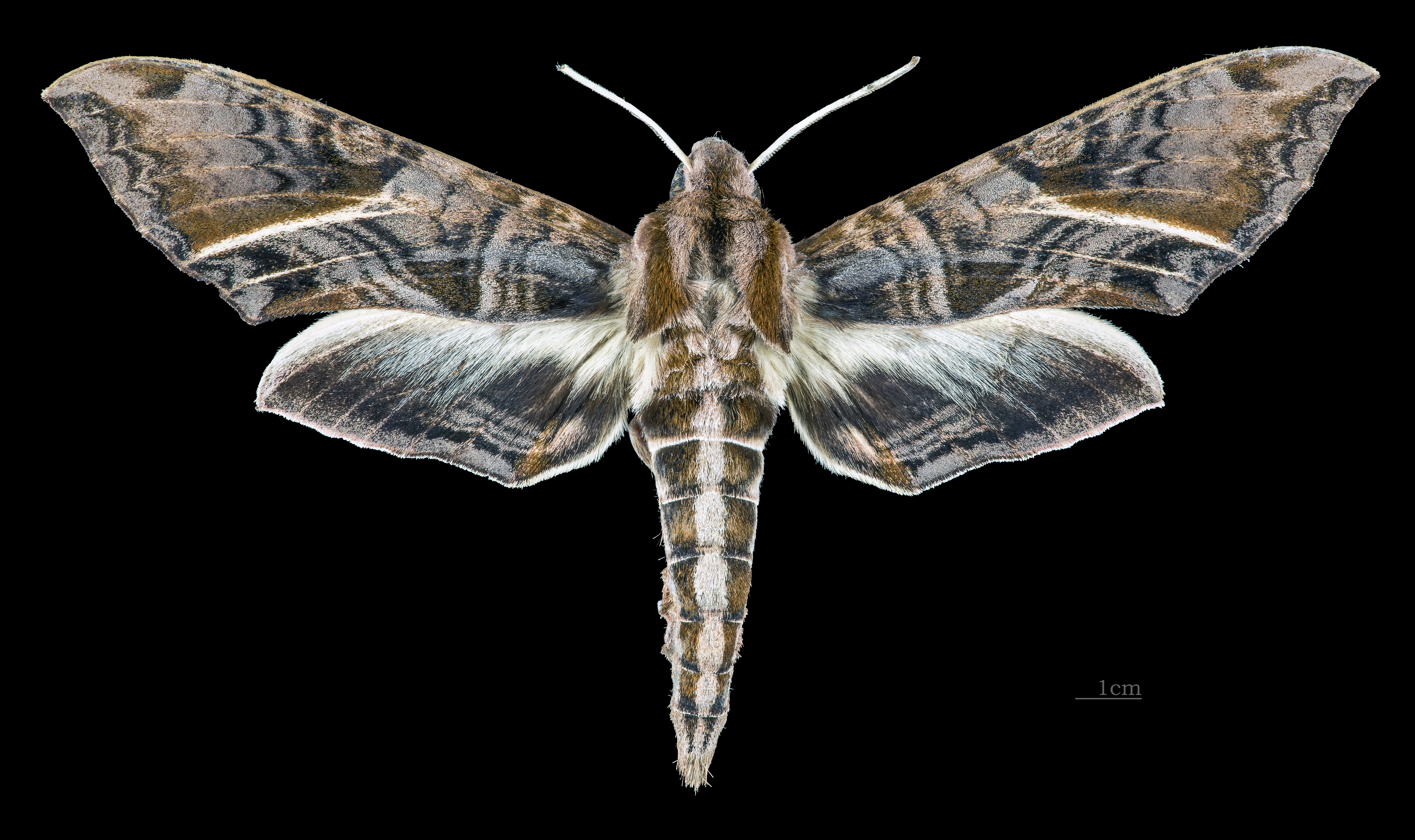
- Male dorsal
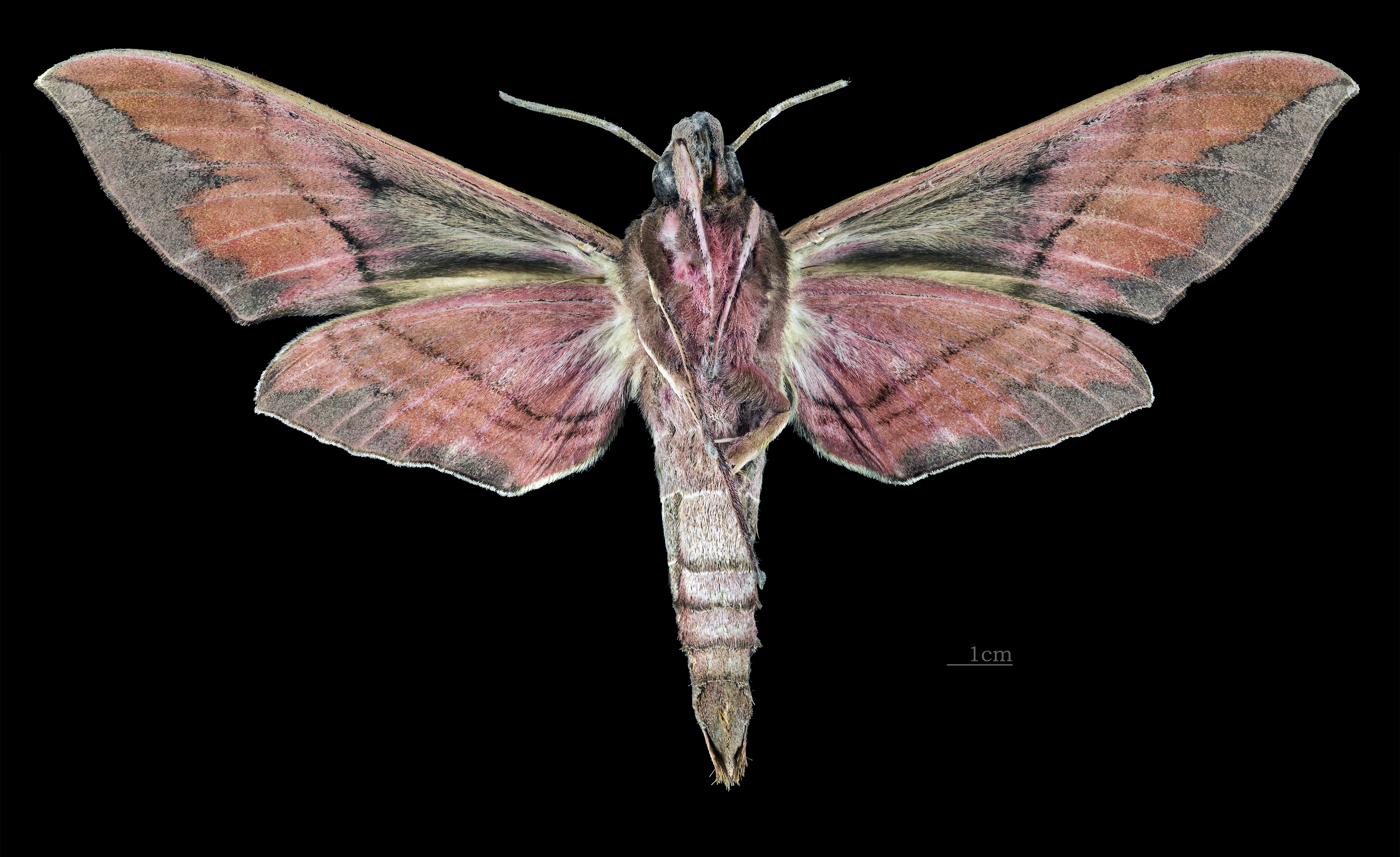
- Male ventral

Scientific classification
- Domain: Eukaryota
- Kingdom: Animalia
- Phylum: Arthropoda
- Class: Insecta
- Order: Lepidoptera
- Family: Sphingidae
- Genus: Eumorpha
- Species: E. neuburgeri

Binomial name
- Eumorpha neuburgeri (Rothschild & Jordan, 1903)

Synonyms
- Pholus neuburgeri Rothschild & Jordan, 1903

= Eumorpha neuburgeri =

Species of moth

Eumorpha neuburgeri is a moth of the family Sphingidae. It is known from Argentina and Bolivia.

The wingspan is 98–106 mm. The outer margin of the forewing is slightly crenulated. The forewing upperside is most similar to Eumorpha anchemolus and Eumorpha triangulum but distinguishable from both by the more-or-less parallel-sided dorsal abdominal band..

Adults have been recorded in late November early December in Argentina.
