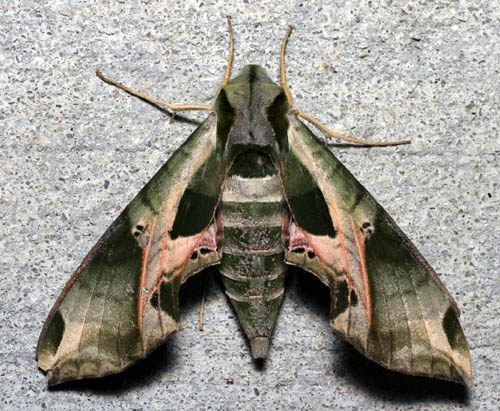
- Eumorpha pandorus

Scientific classification
- Domain: Eukaryota
- Kingdom: Animalia
- Phylum: Arthropoda
- Class: Insecta
- Order: Lepidoptera
- Family: Sphingidae
- Subfamily: Macroglossinae
- Tribe: Philampelini; Burmeister, 1878

Genera
- See text

= Philampelini =

Tribe of moths

Philampelini is a tribe of moths of the family Sphingidae.

== Taxonomy ==
- Genus Eumorpha - Hübner, 1807
- Genus Tinostoma - Rothschild & Jordan, 1903
