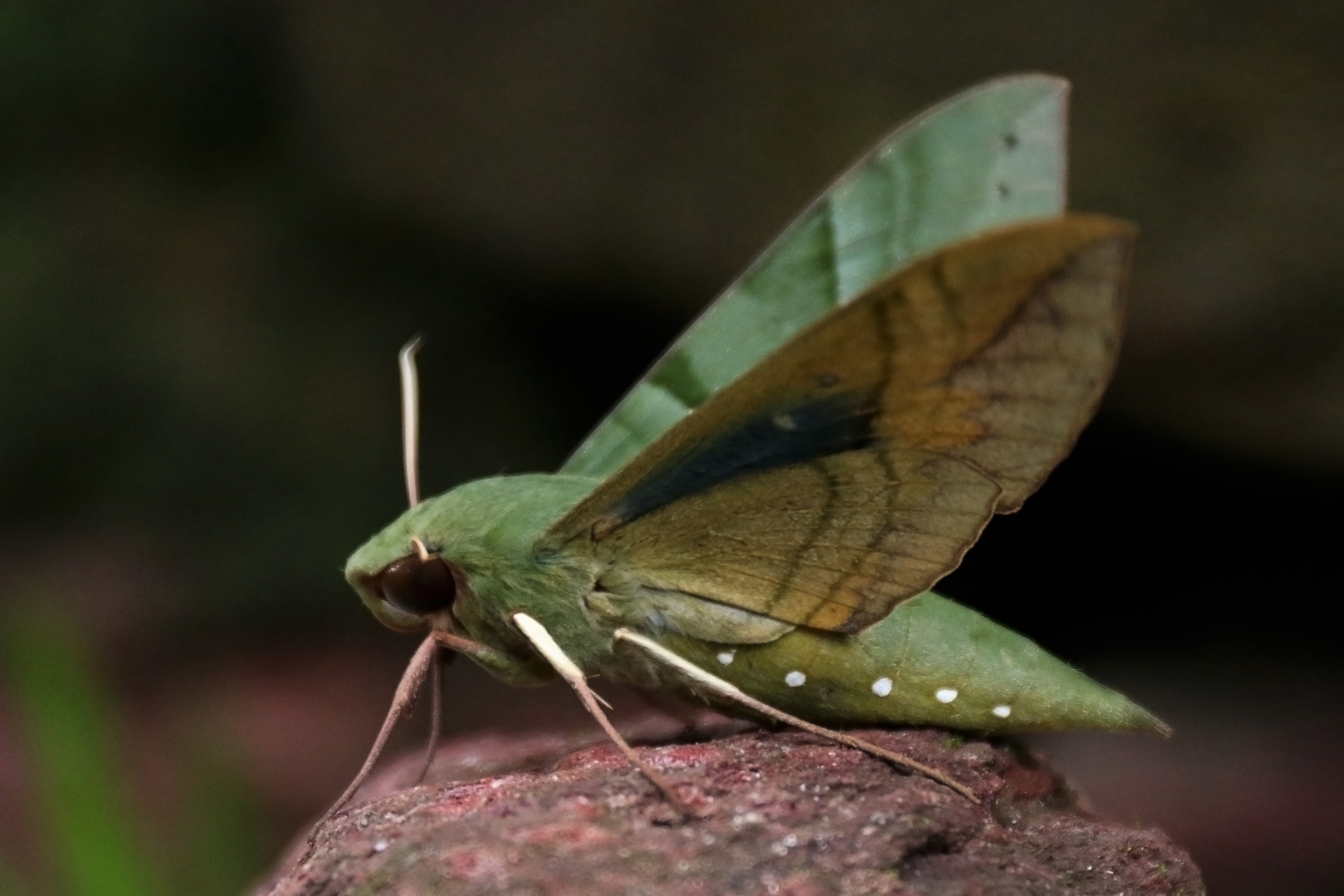
- Eumorpha labruscae

Scientific classification
- Domain: Eukaryota
- Kingdom: Animalia
- Phylum: Arthropoda
- Class: Insecta
- Order: Lepidoptera
- Family: Sphingidae
- Tribe: Philampelini
- Genus: Eumorpha; Hübner, 1807

Synonyms
- Argeus Hübner, 1819; Dupo Hübner, 1819; Philampelus Harris, 1839; Pholus Hübner, 1819

= Eumorpha =

Genus of moths

Eumorpha (meaning "well formed") is a genus of moths in the family Sphingidae. The genus is mostly found in North and South America.

== Species ==
- Eumorpha achemon (Drury, 1773)
- Eumorpha adamsi (Rothschild & Jordan, 1903)
- Eumorpha analis (Rothschild & Jordan, 1903)
- Eumorpha anchemolus (Cramer, 1779)
- Eumorpha capronnieri (Boisduval, 1875)
- Eumorpha cissi (Schaufuss, 1870)
- Eumorpha drucei (Rothschild & Jordan, 1903)
- Eumorpha elisa (Smyth, 1901)
- Eumorpha fasciatus (Sulzer, 1776)
- Eumorpha intermedia (Clark, 1917)
- Eumorpha labruscae (Linnaeus, 1758)
- Eumorpha megaeacus (Hübner, 1816)
- Eumorpha mirificatus (Grote, 1874)
- Eumorpha neuburgeri (Rothschild & Jordan, 1903)
- Eumorpha obliquus (Rothschild & Jordan, 1903)
- Eumorpha pandorus (Hübner, 1821)
- Eumorpha phorbas (Cramer, 1775)
- Eumorpha satellitia (Linnaeus, 1771)
- Eumorpha strenua (Menetries, 1857)
- Eumorpha translineatus (Rothschild, 1895)
- Eumorpha triangulum (Rothschild & Jordan, 1903)
- Eumorpha typhon (Klug, 1836)
- Eumorpha vitis (Linnaeus, 1758)

== Species gallery ==
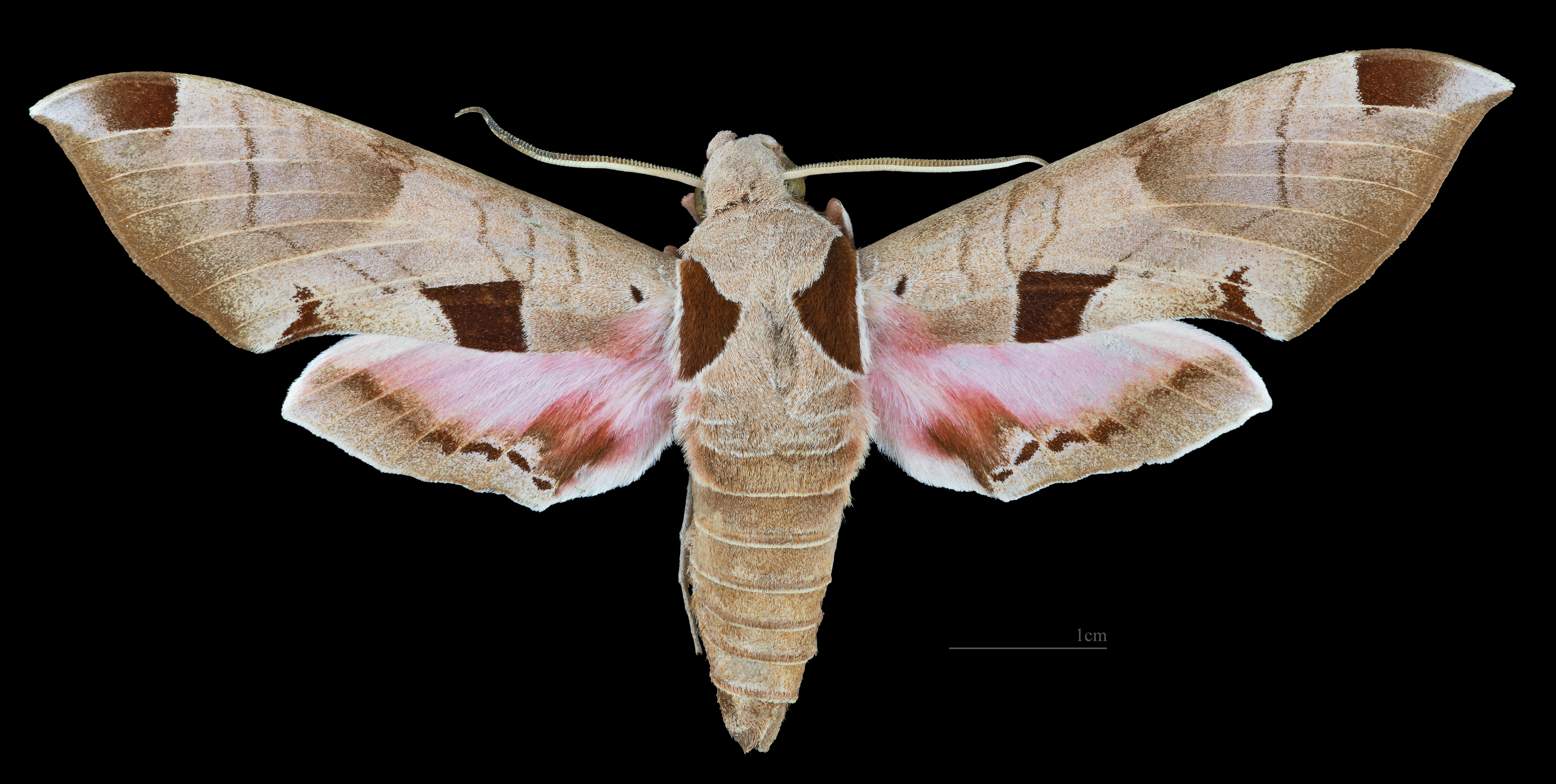
Eumorpha achemon

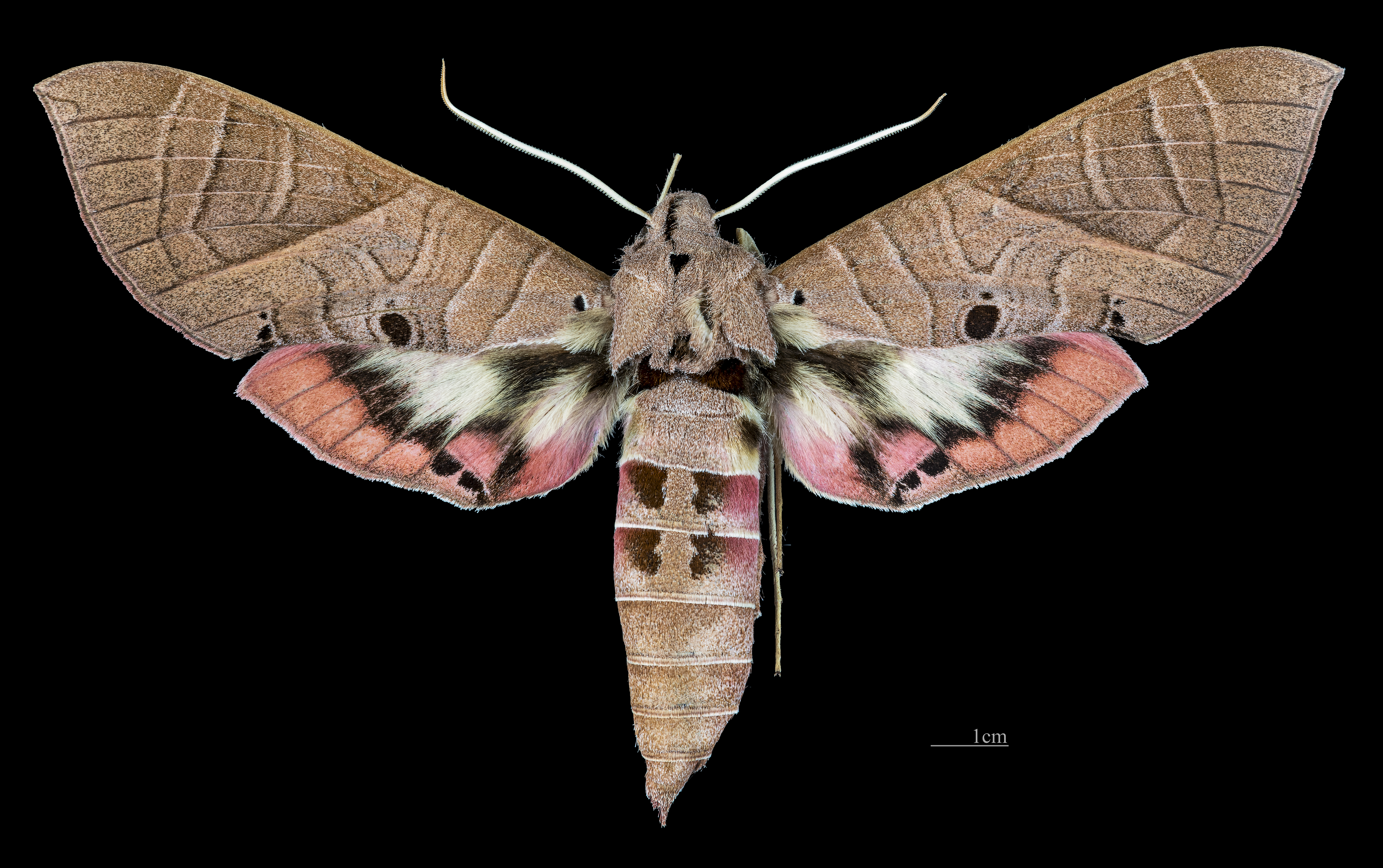
Eumorpha adamsi

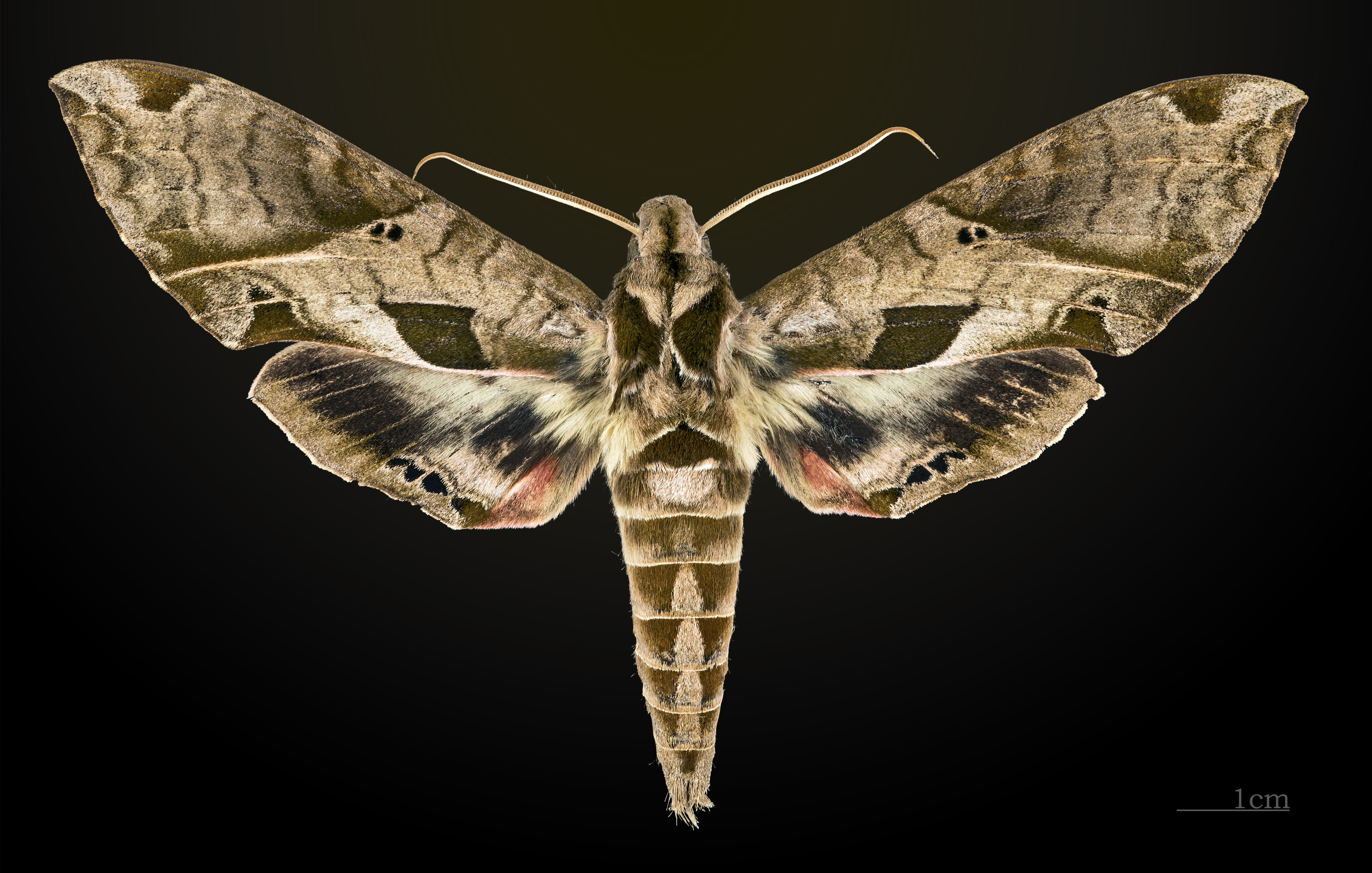
Eumorpha analis

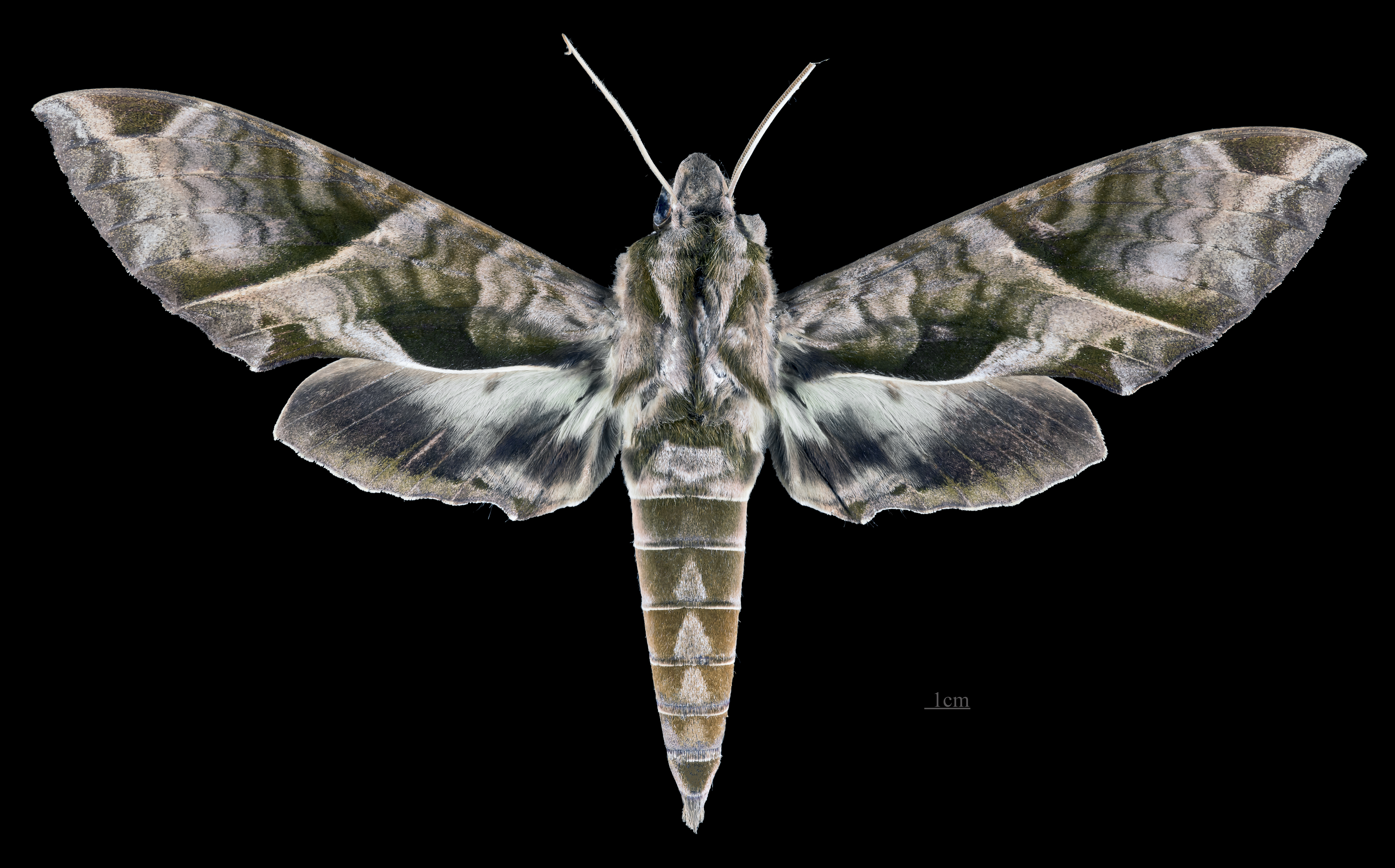
Eumorpha anchemolus

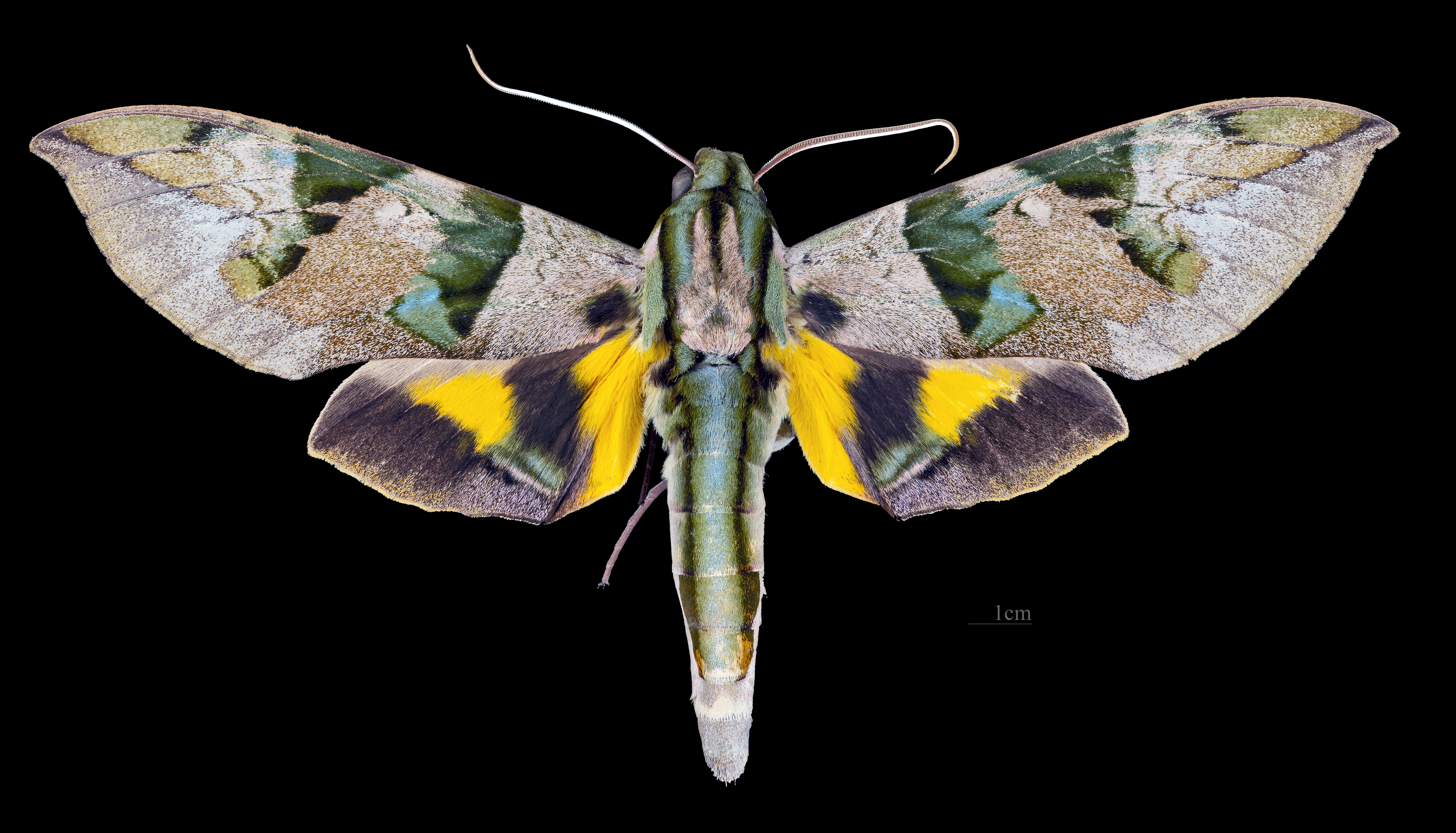
Eumorpha capronnieri

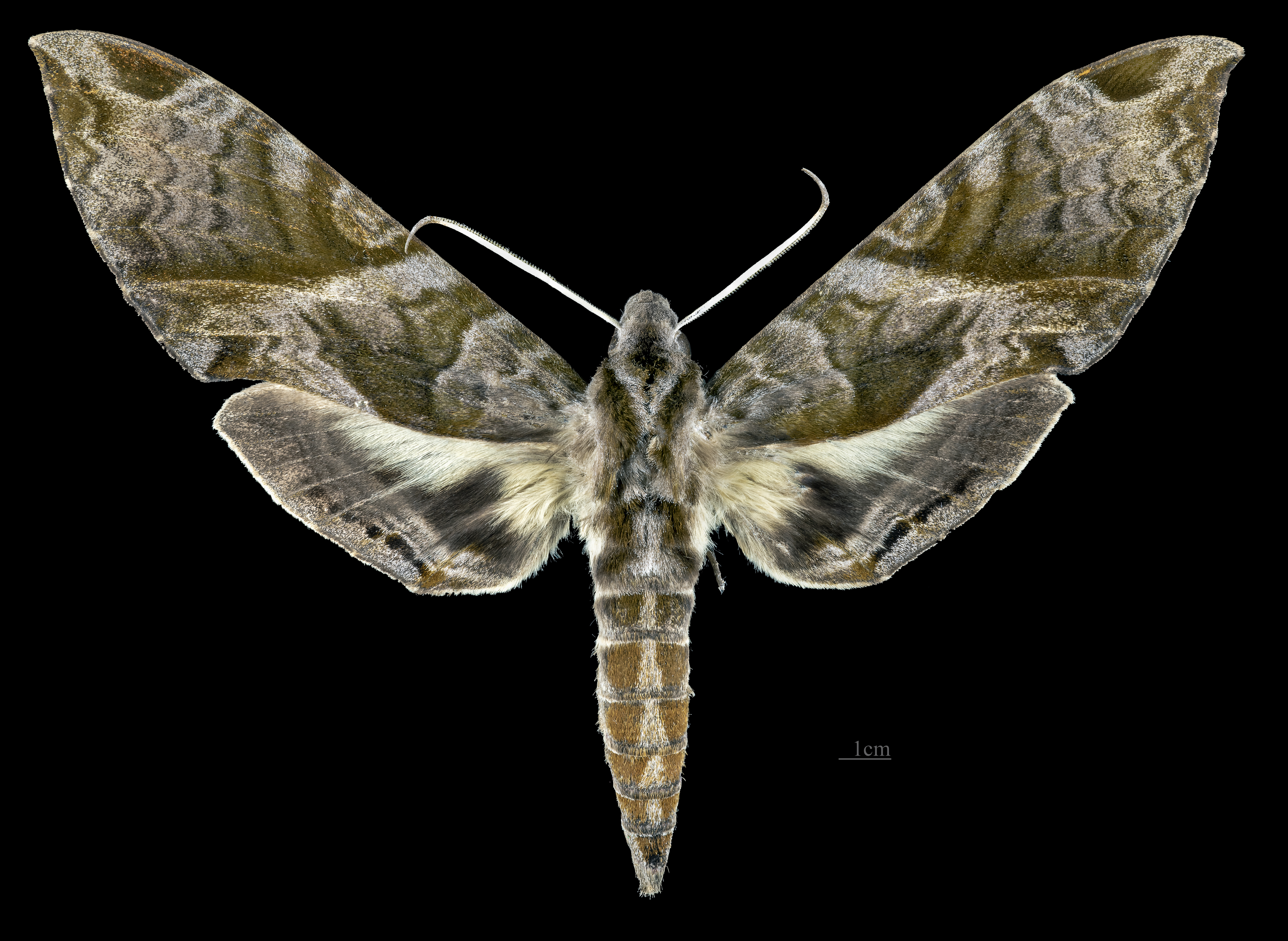
Eumorpha cissi

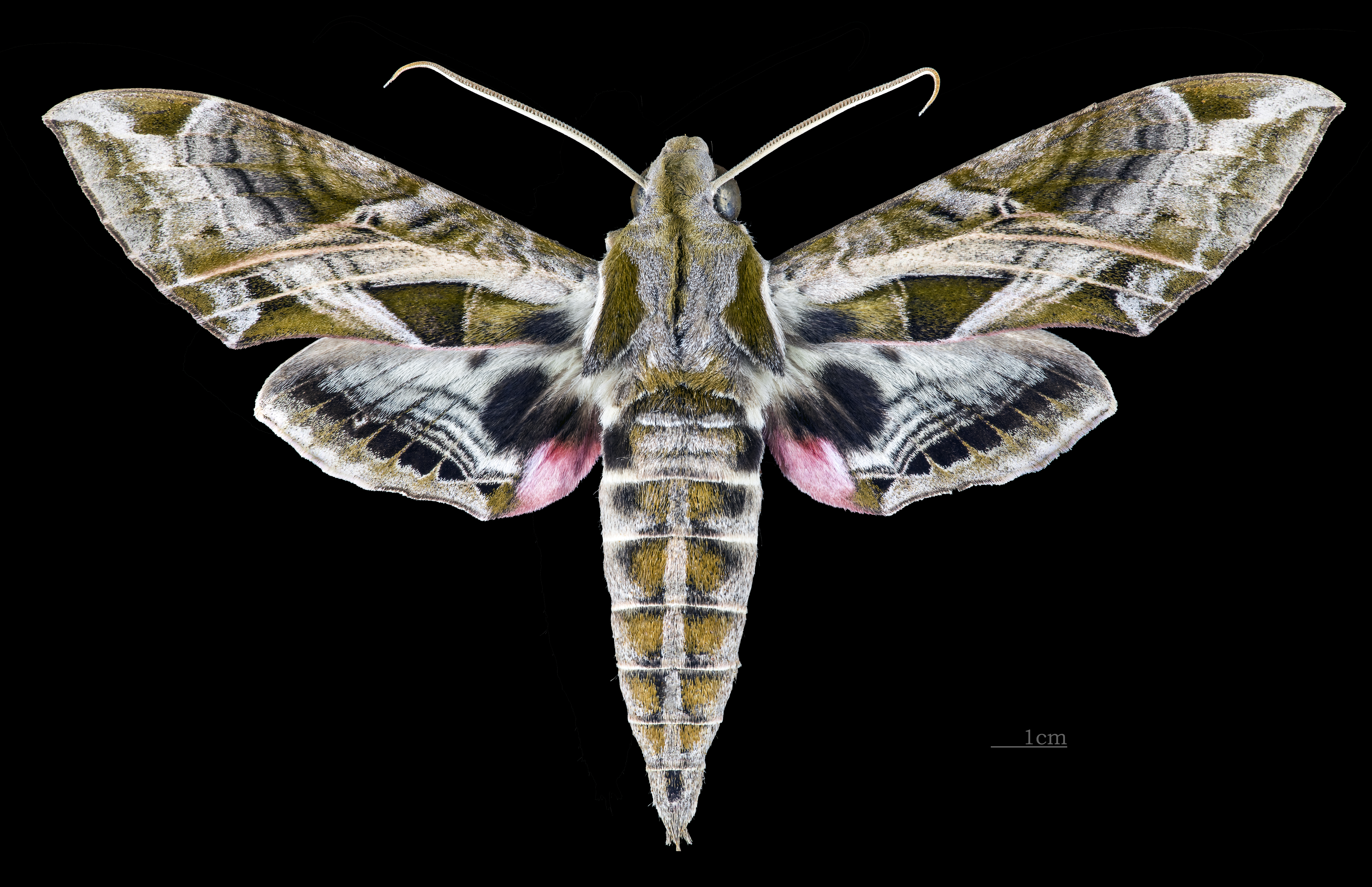
Eumorpha drucei

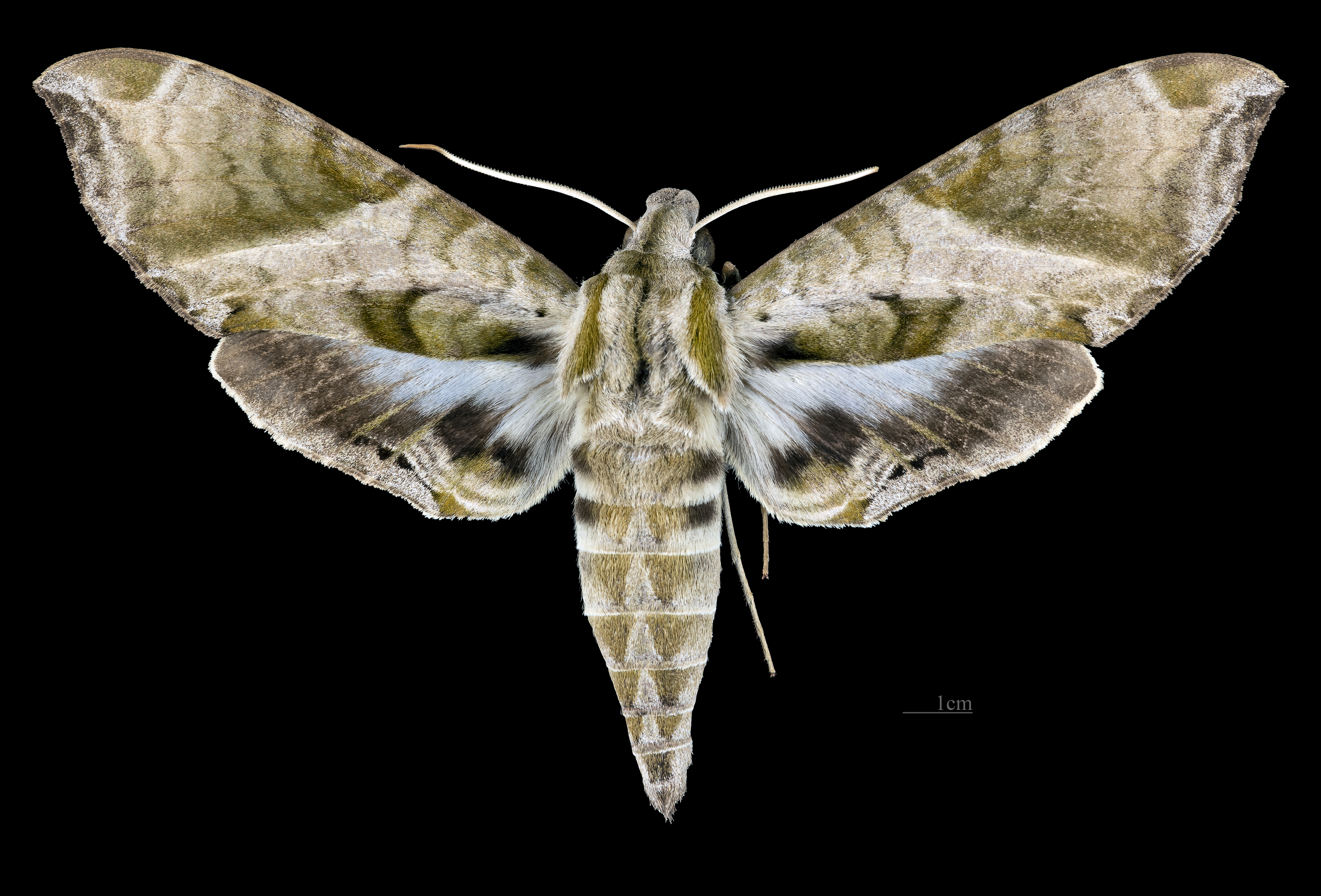
Eumorpha elisa

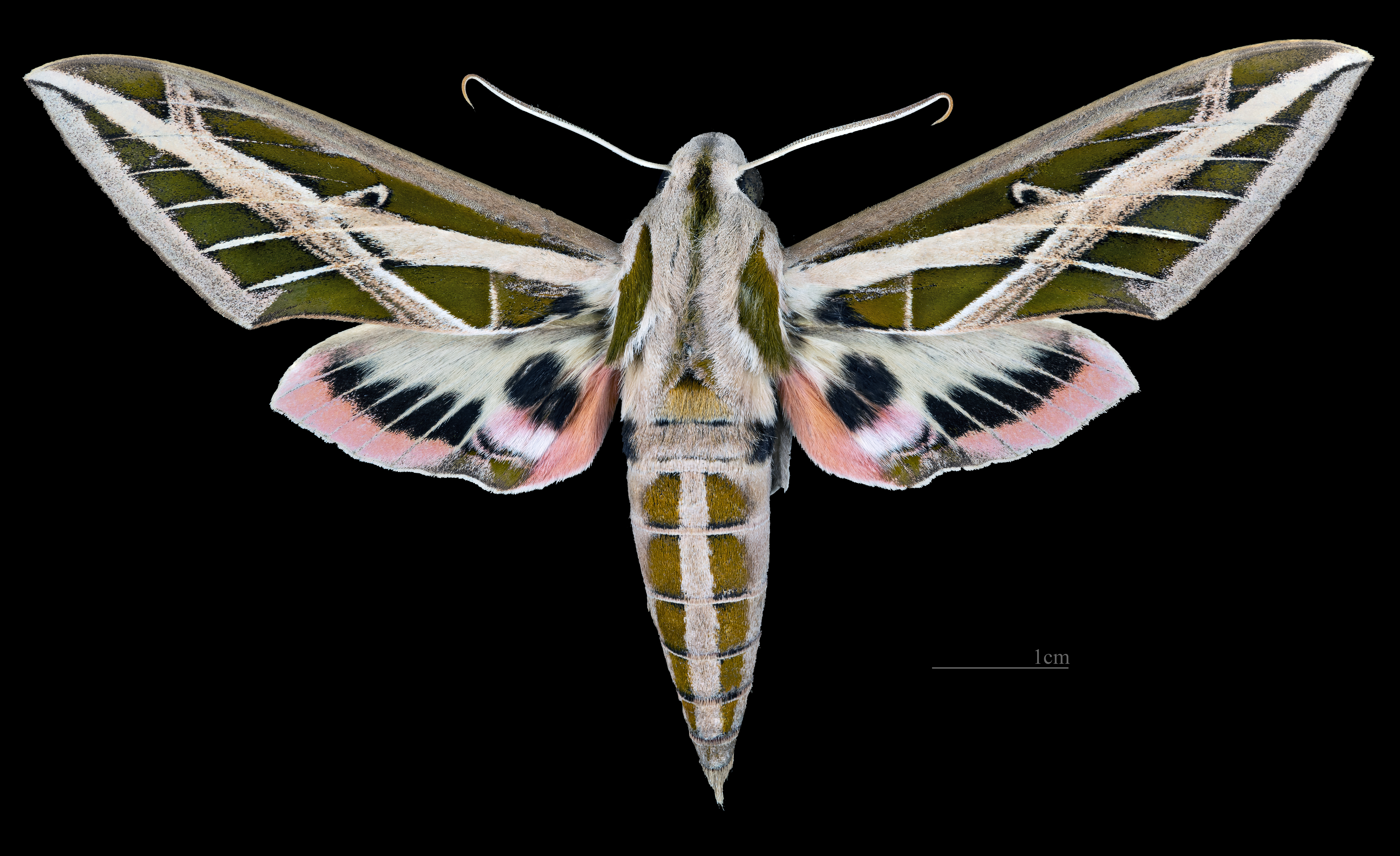
Eumorpha fasciata

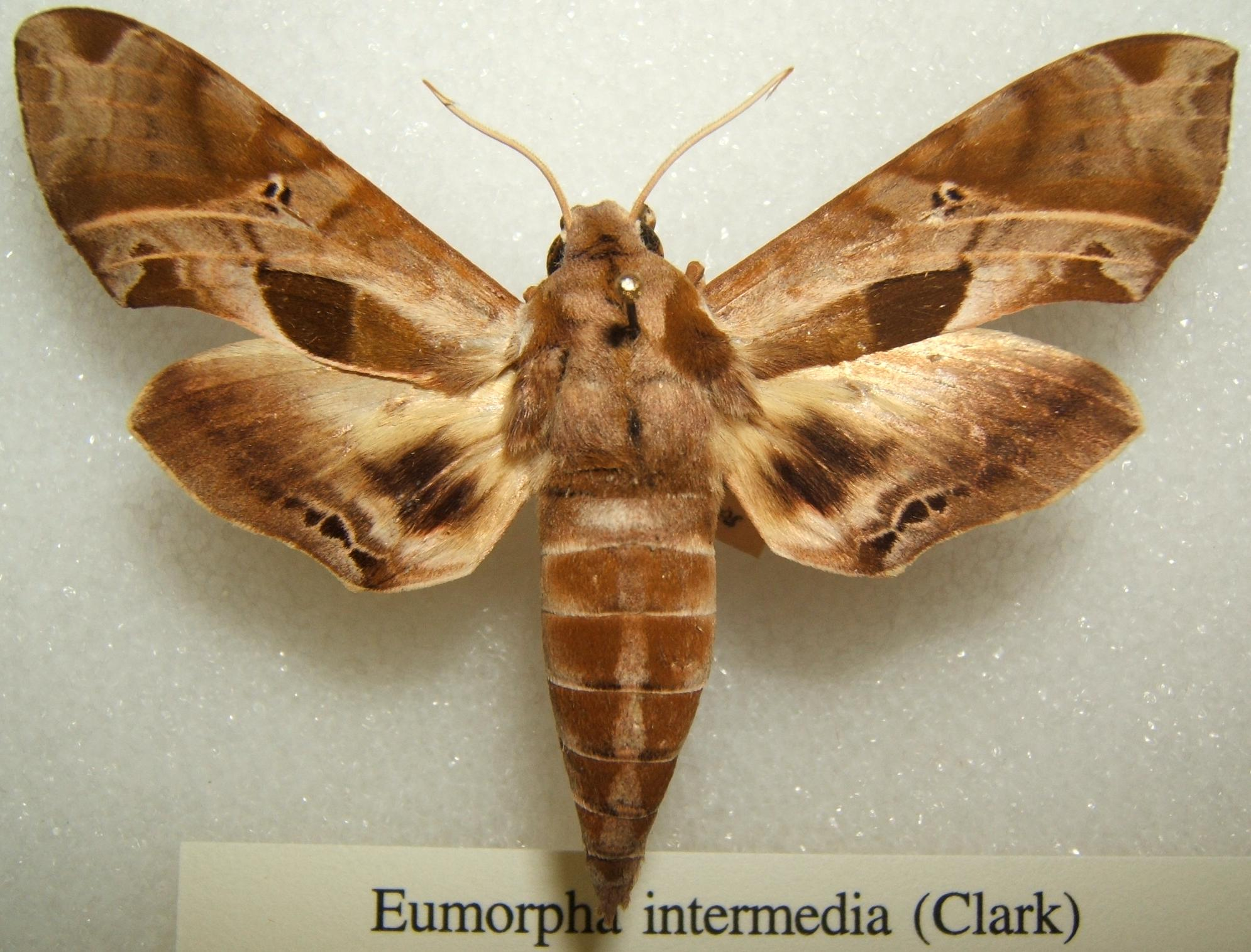
Eumorpha intermedia

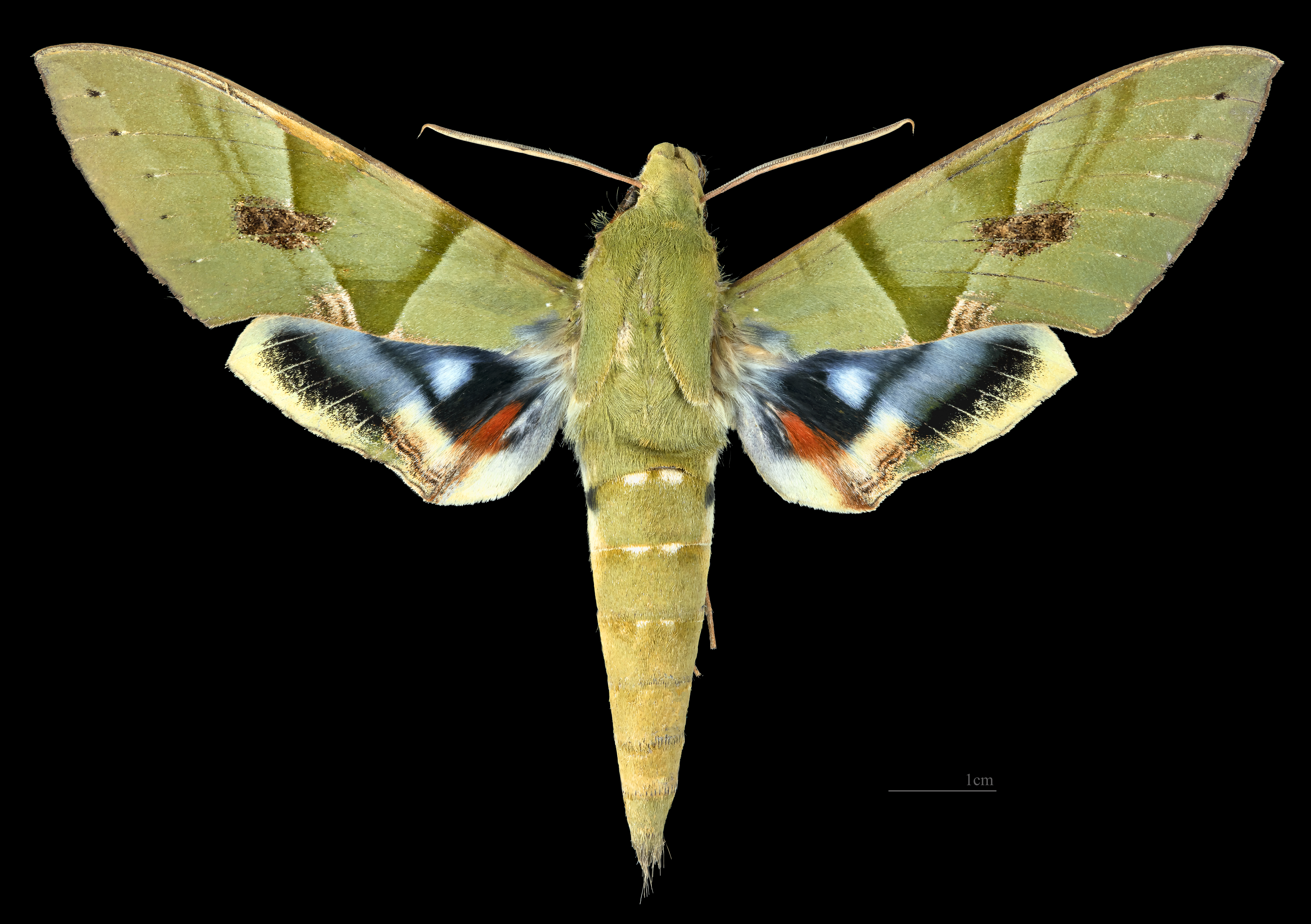
Eumorpha labruscae

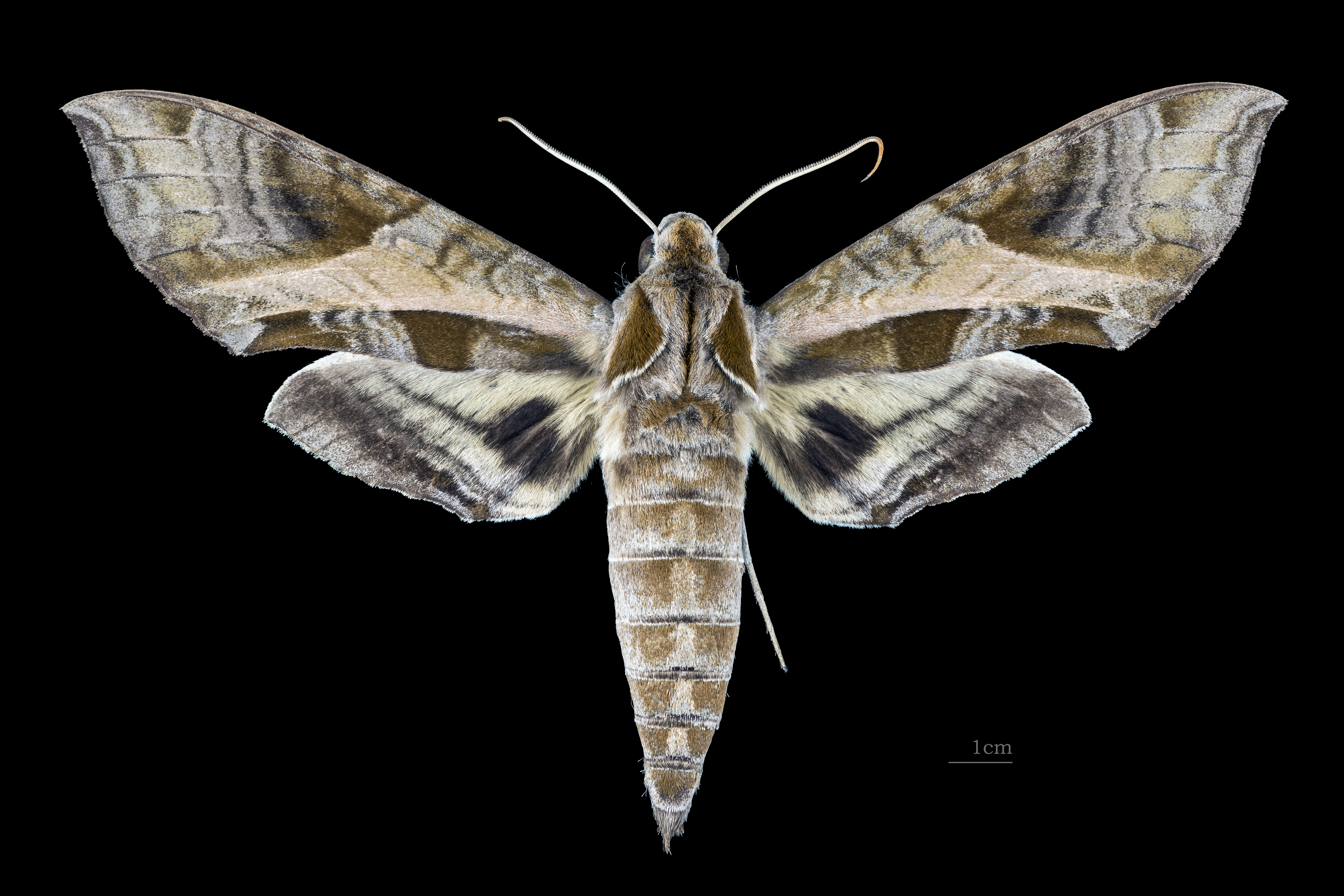
Eumorpha megaeacus

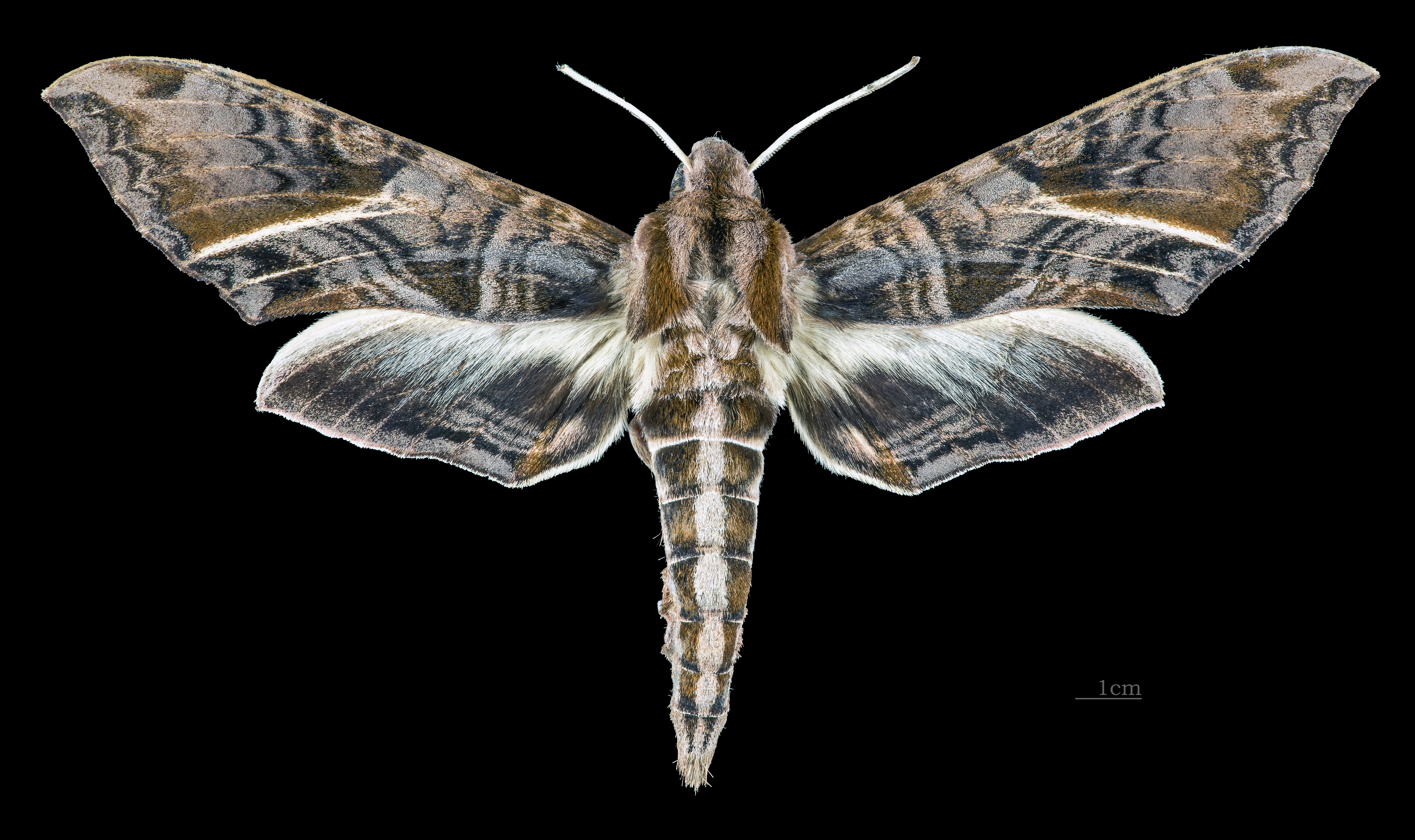
Eumorpha neuburgeri

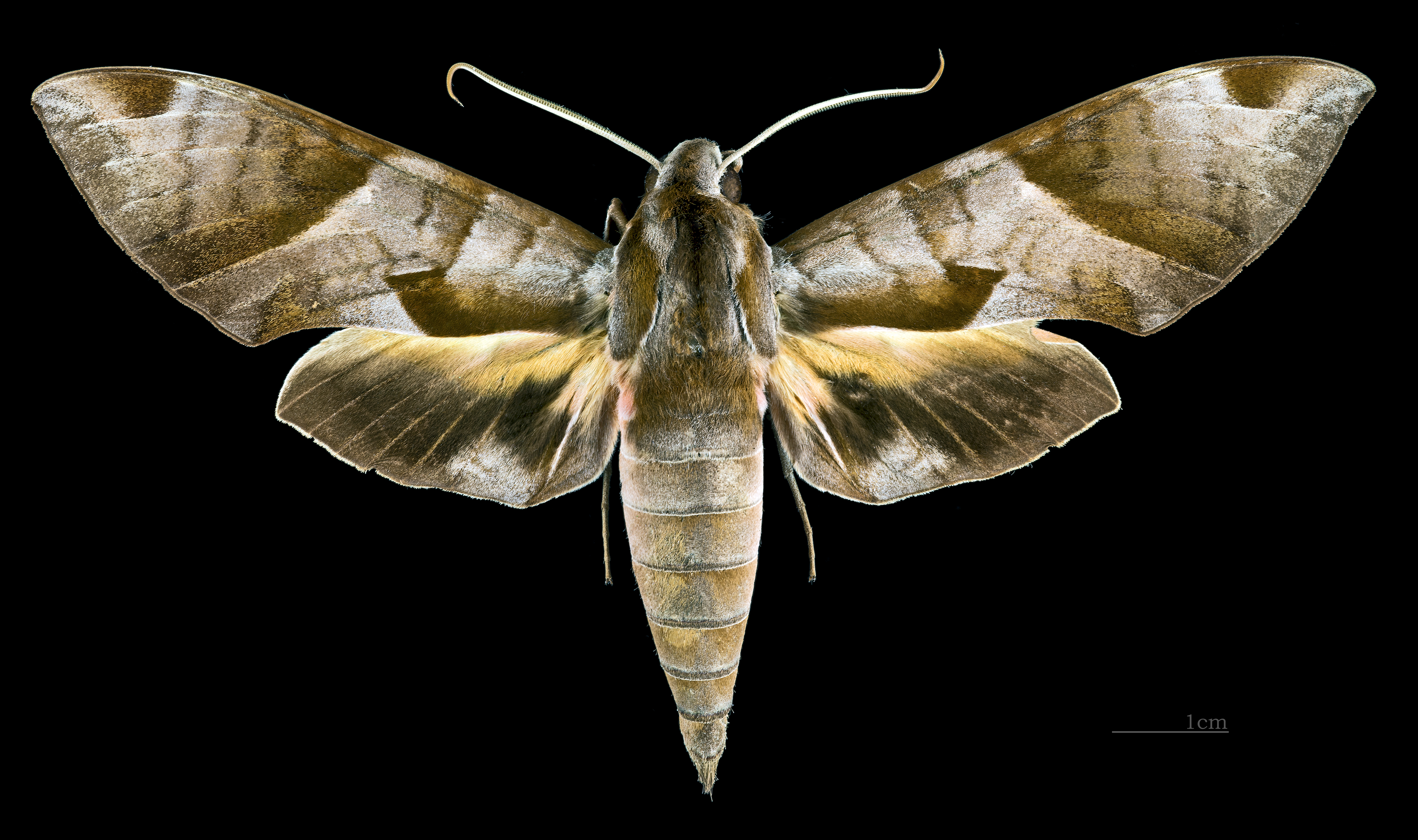
Eumorpha obliquus

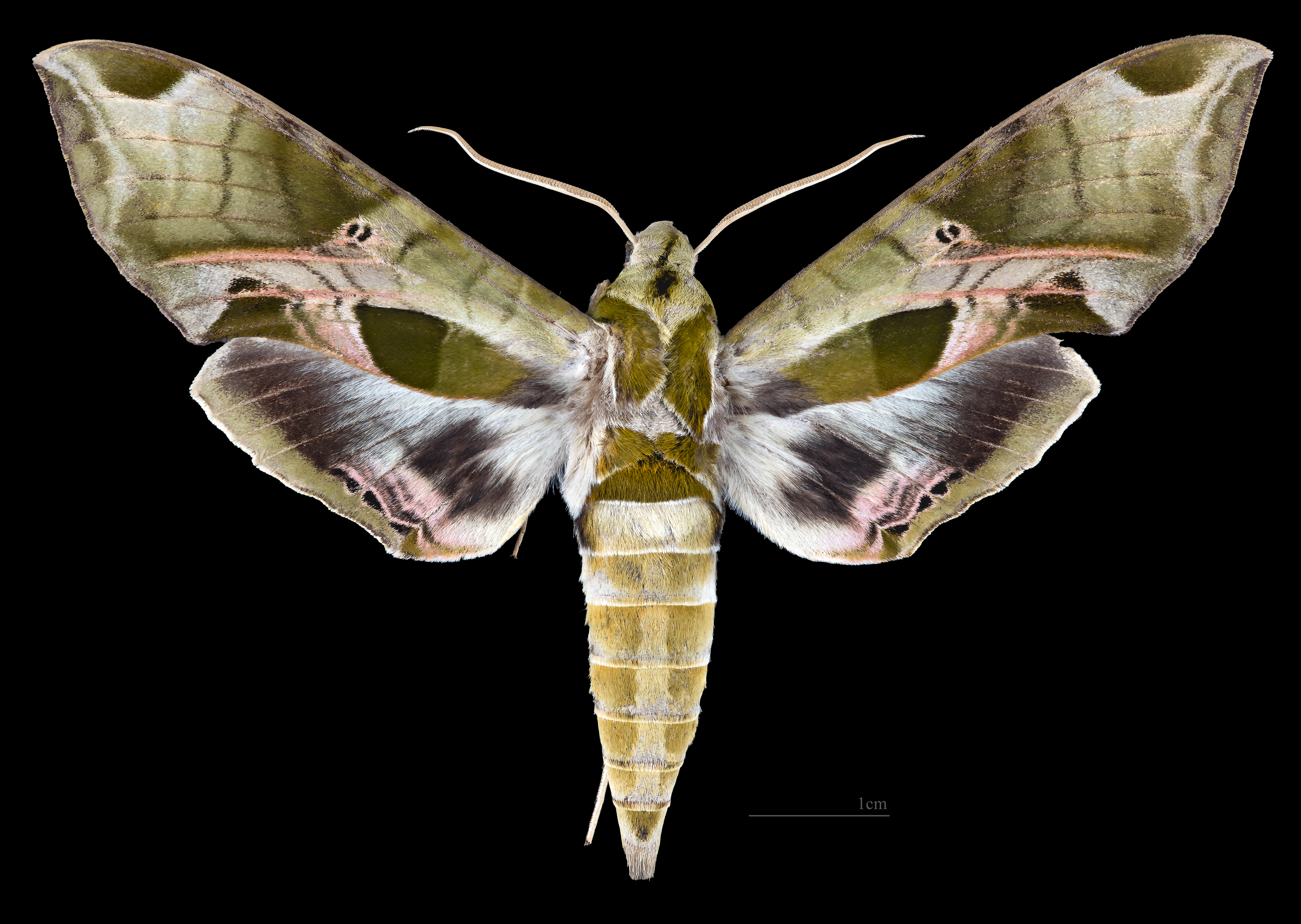
Eumorpha pandorus

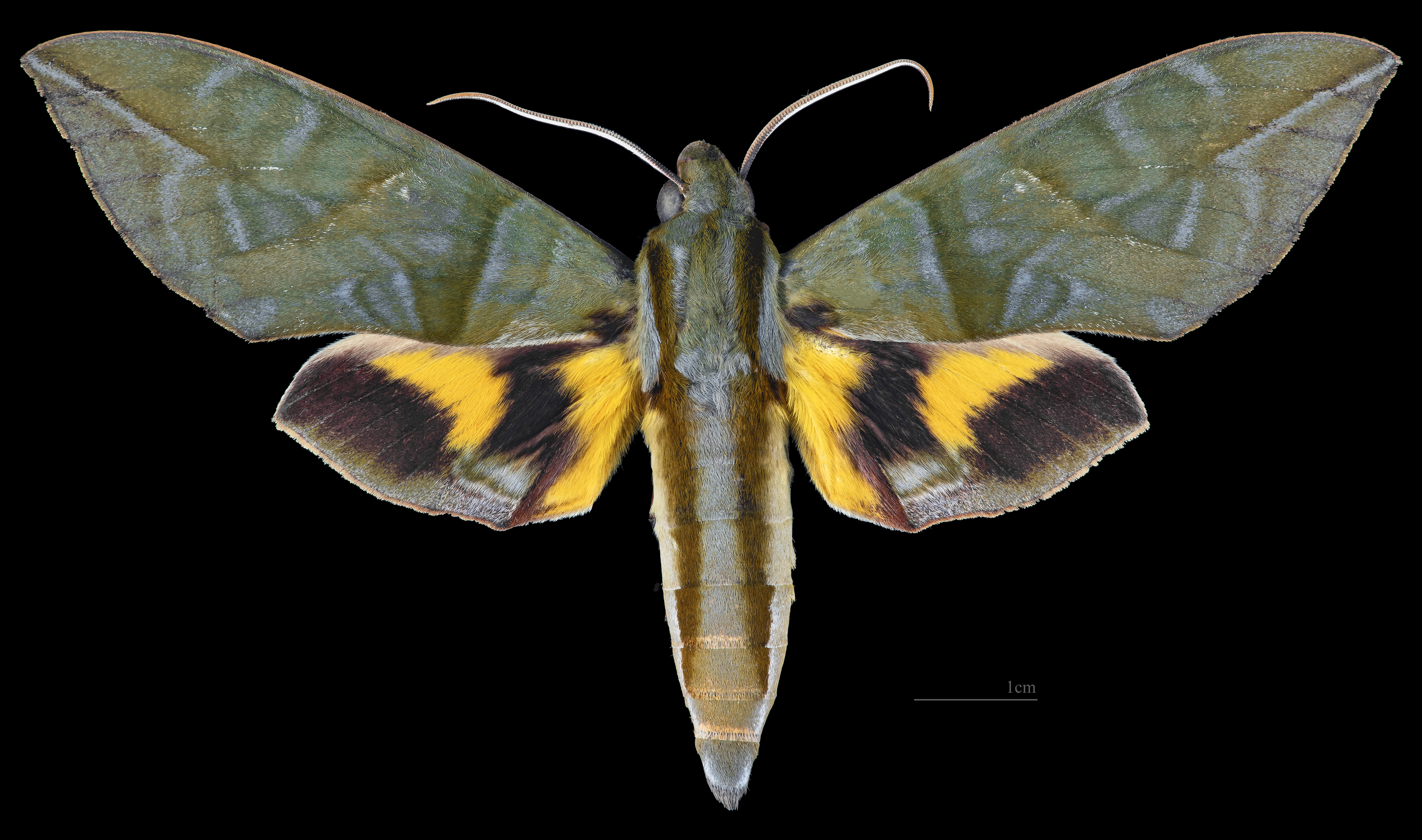
Eumorpha phorbas

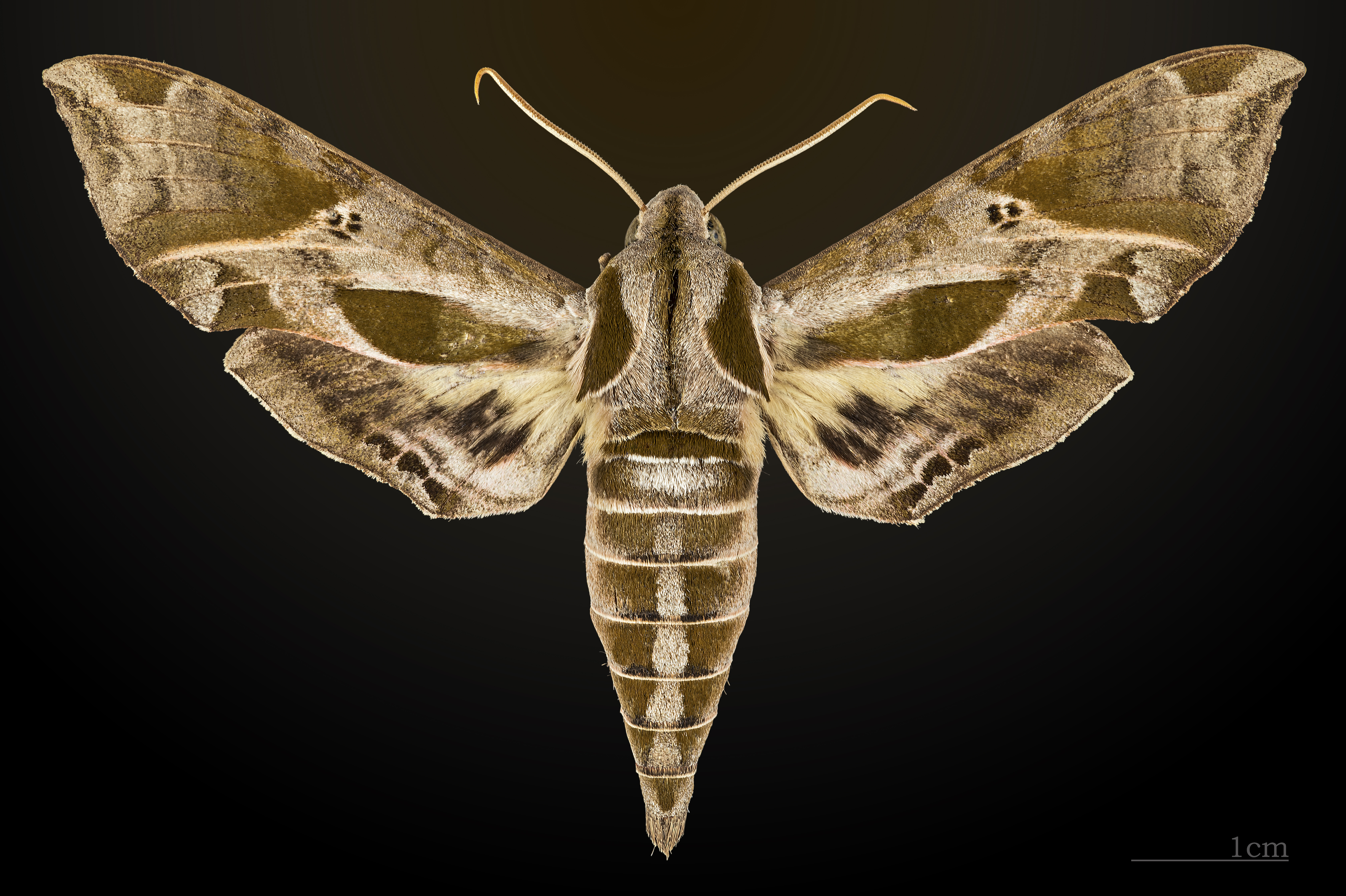
Eumorpha satellitia

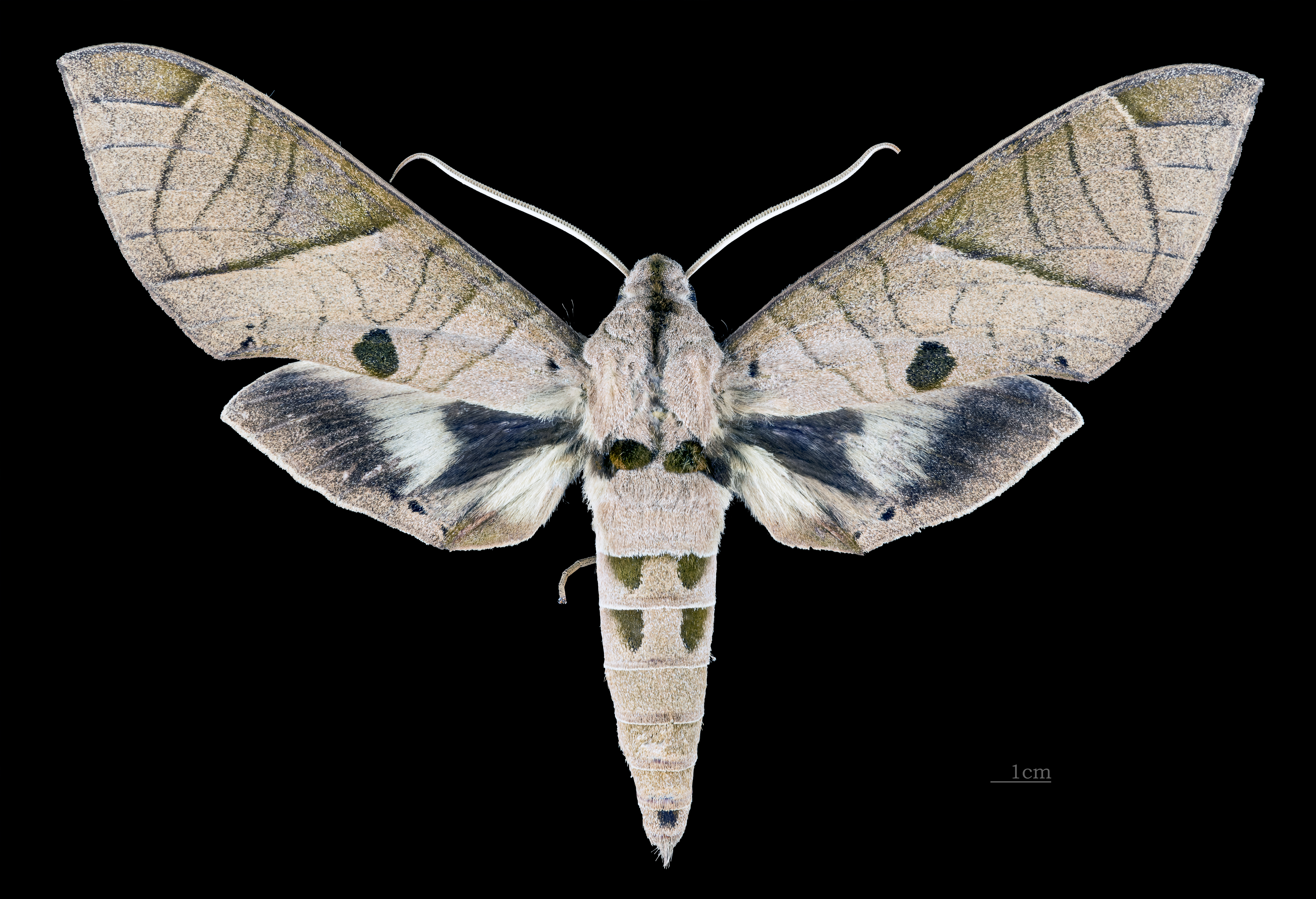
Eumorpha translineatus

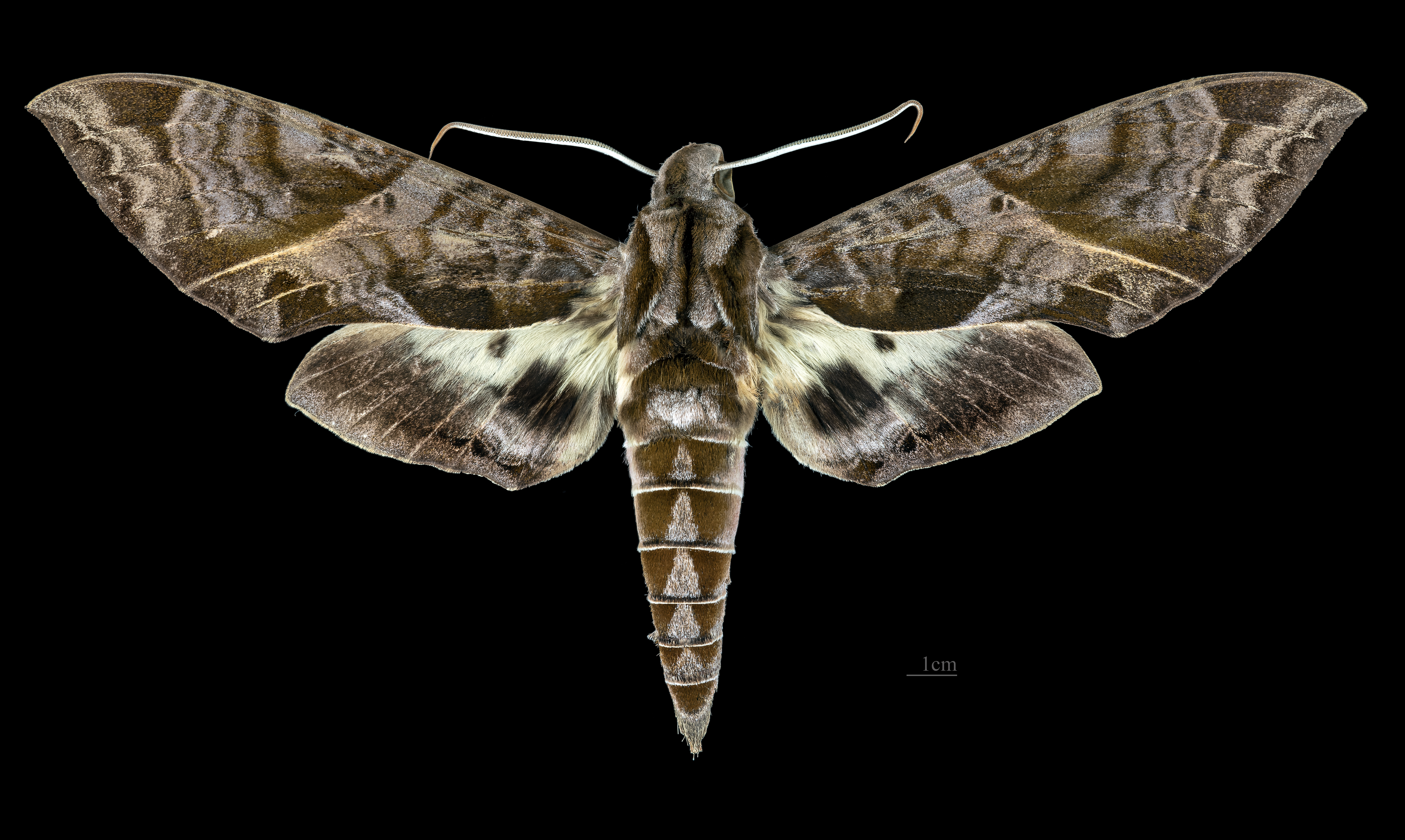
Eumorpha triangulum

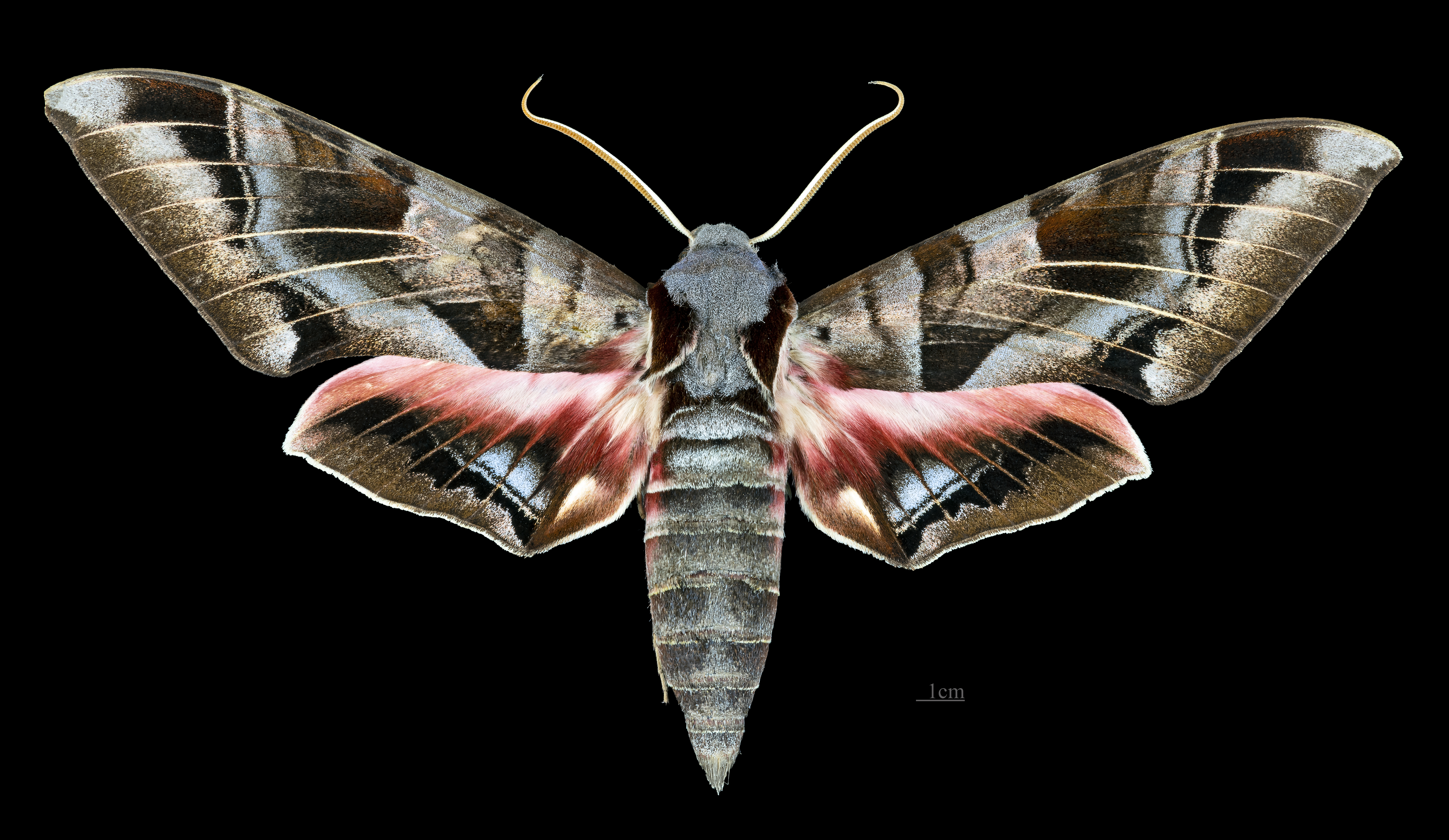
Eumorpha typhon

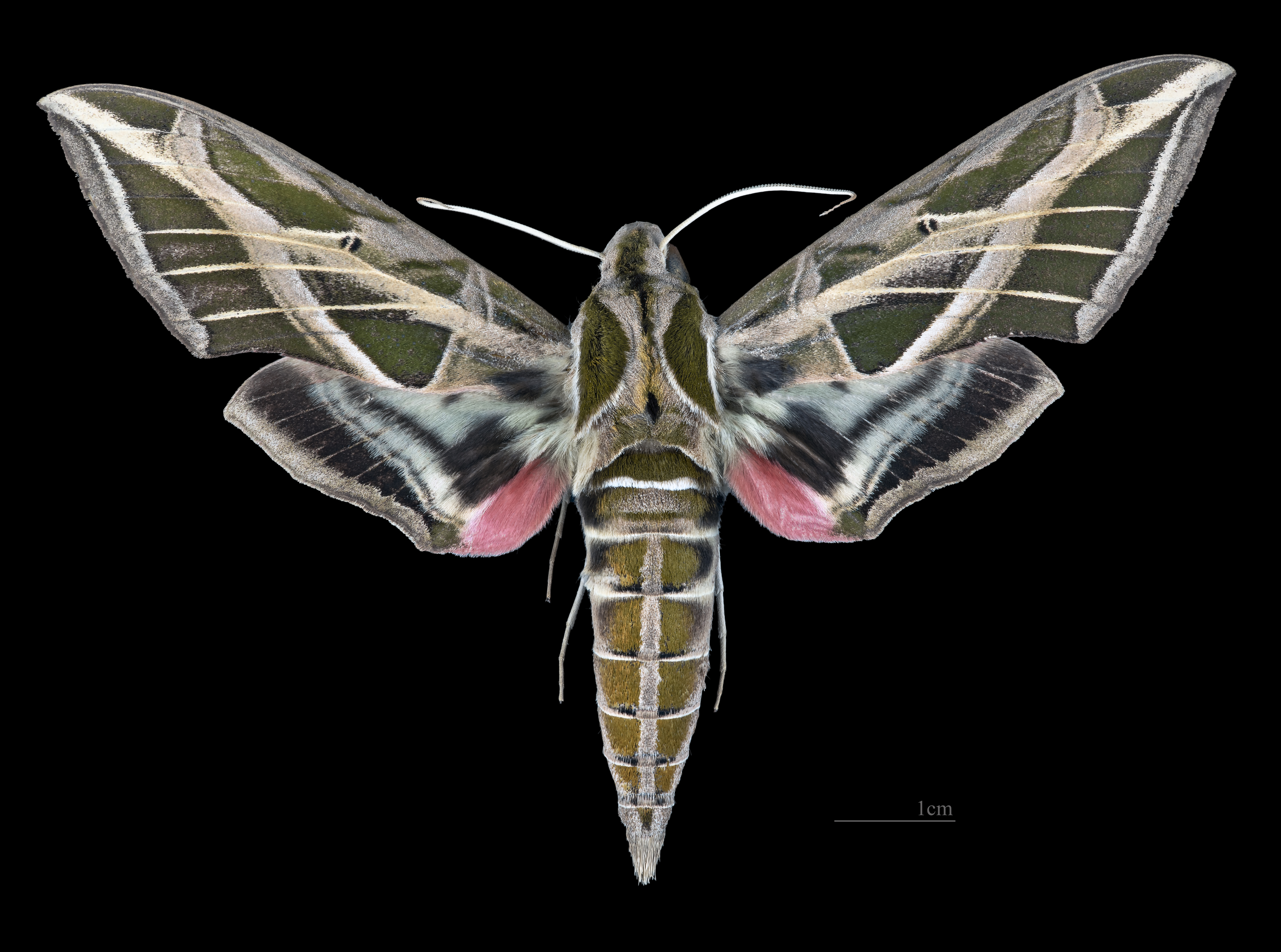
Eumorpha vitis
