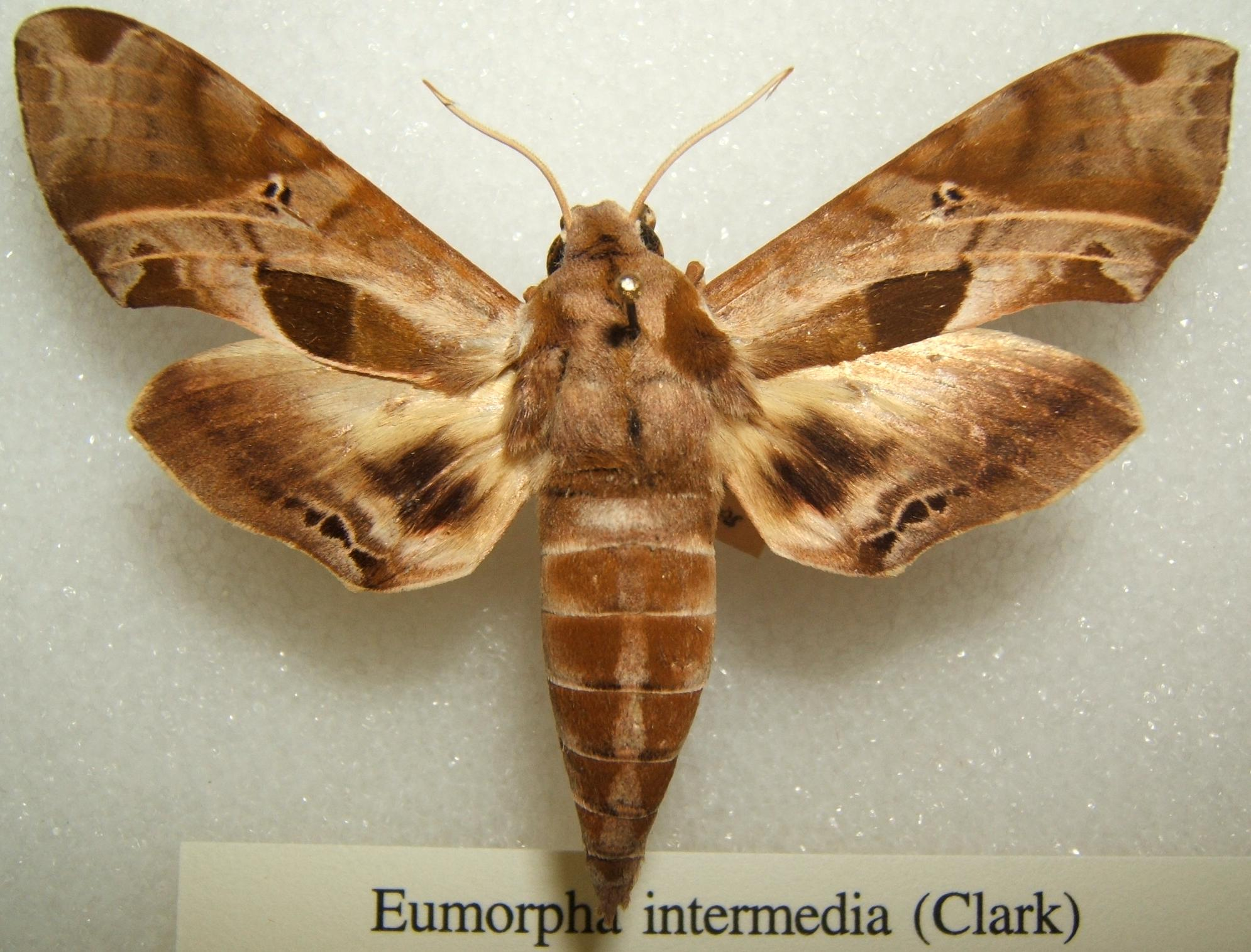

Conservation status
- Vulnerable (NatureServe)

Scientific classification
- Kingdom: Animalia
- Phylum: Arthropoda
- Clade: Pancrustacea
- Class: Insecta
- Order: Lepidoptera
- Family: Sphingidae
- Genus: Eumorpha
- Species: E. intermedia

Binomial name
- Eumorpha intermedia (B. P. Clark, 1917)

Synonyms
- Pholus intermedia Clark, 1917

= Eumorpha intermedia =

Intermediate sphinx

Species of moth

Eumorpha intermedia, the intermediate sphinx, is a moth of the family Sphingidae. The species was first described by Benjamin Preston Clark in 1917. It lives in the US states of North Carolina, Florida, Mississippi, Louisiana, and southern Texas.

The wingspan is 90–98 mm (3.5–3.9 in). It is similar to Eumorpha pandorus and Eumorpha satellitia licaon, but closer to the latter. The forewing underside is dark brown with a distinct pink tinge, especially on the hindwing. The hindwing upperside is similar in color to Eumorpha satellitia licaon.

Adults are on wing from April to October. They nectar at various flowers.

The larvae feed on Ampelopsis arborea and possibly Vitis species.
