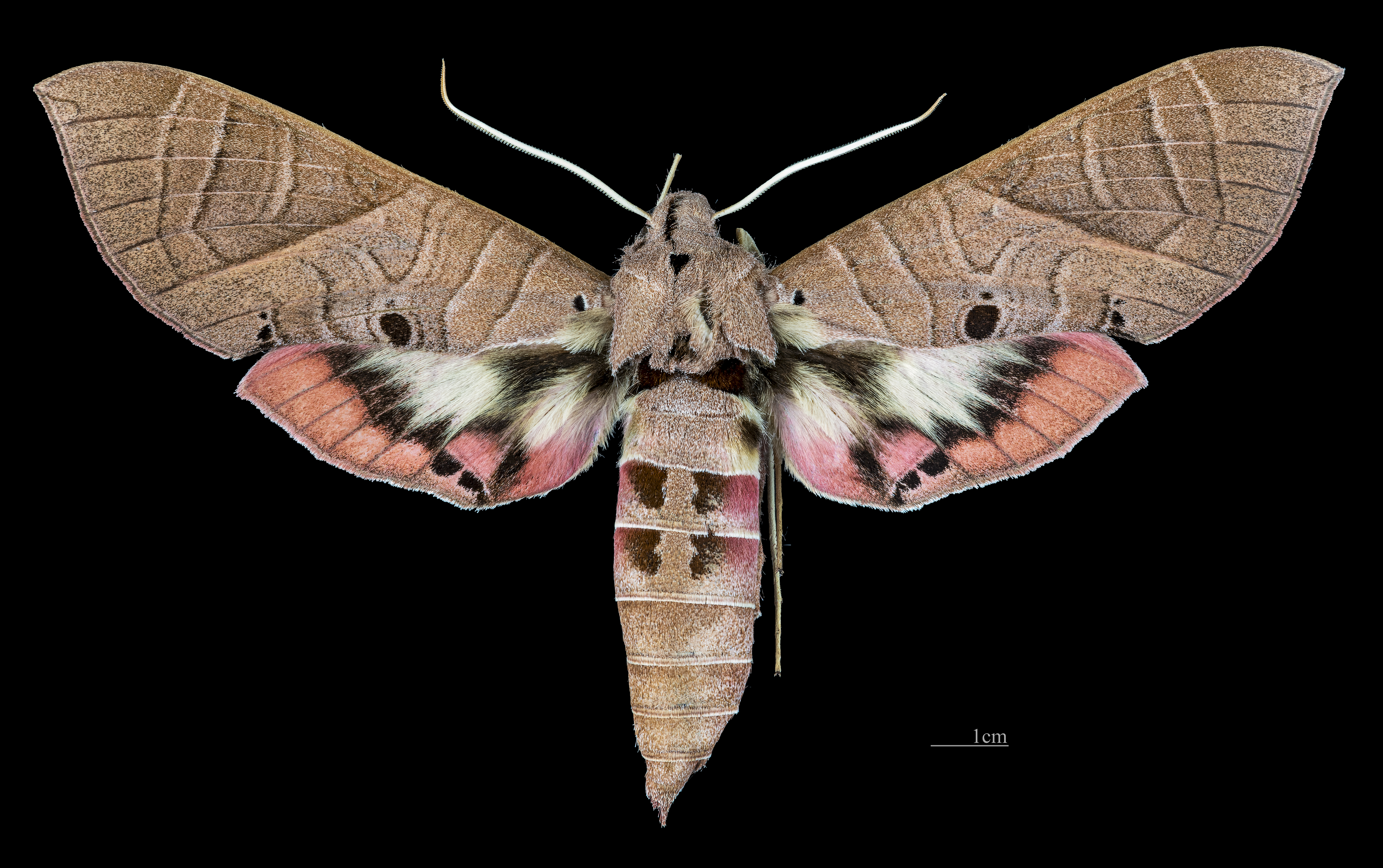
- Male dorsal
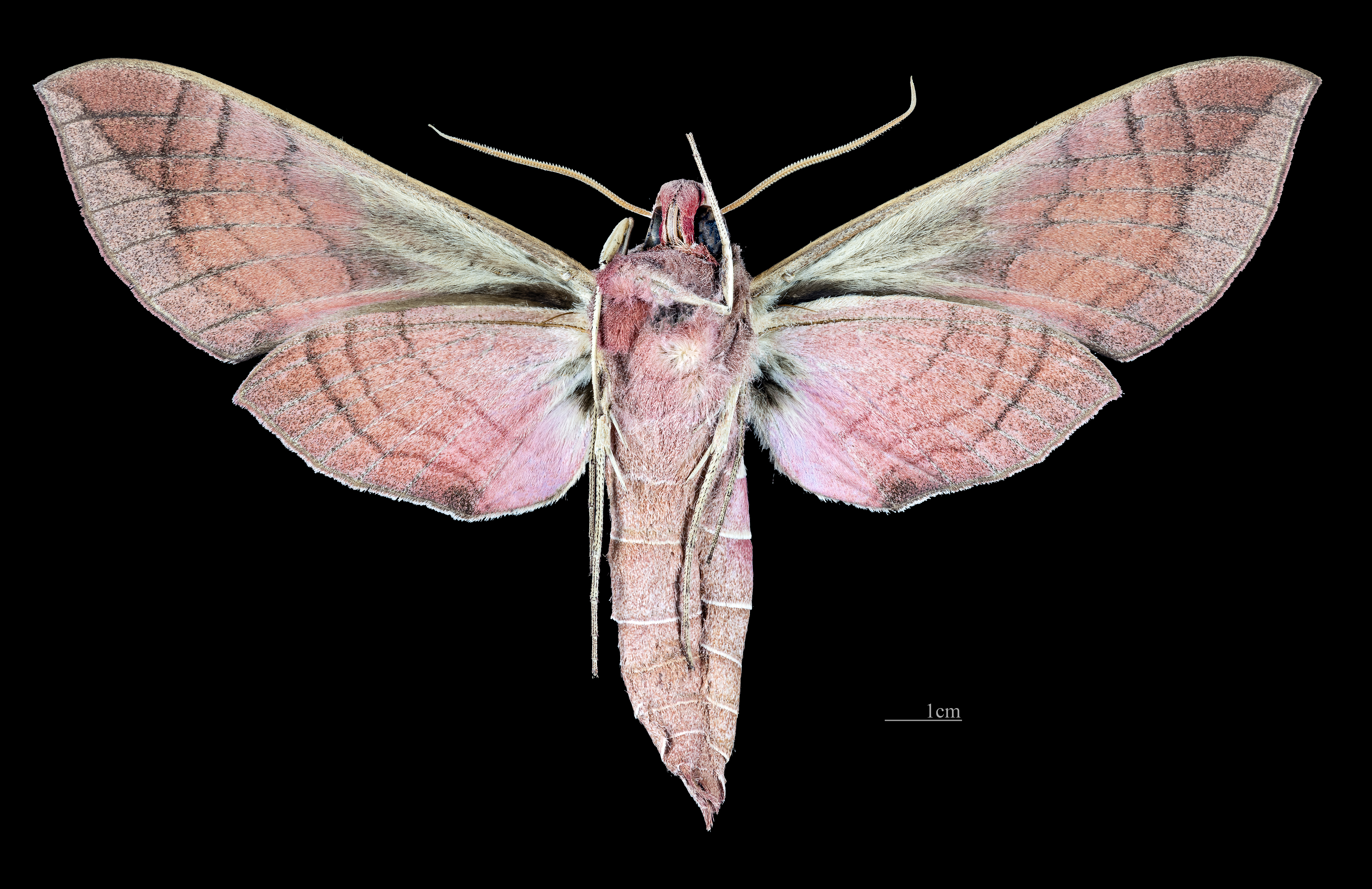
- Male ventral

Scientific classification
- Domain: Eukaryota
- Kingdom: Animalia
- Phylum: Arthropoda
- Class: Insecta
- Order: Lepidoptera
- Family: Sphingidae
- Genus: Eumorpha
- Species: E. adamsi

Binomial name
- Eumorpha adamsi Rothschild & Jordan, 1903

Synonyms
- Pholus adamsi Rothschild & Jordan, 1903

= Eumorpha adamsi =

Species of moth

Eumorpha adamsi is a species of moth in the family Sphingidae. It was described by Walter Rothschild and Karl Jordan, in 1903, and is known from Venezuela, Brazil, Bolivia and Paraguay but is probably present throughout most of South America.

Males have a forewing length of 40 millimetres. It is similar to Eumorpha translineatus, but can be distinguished by the bright pink marginal band and tornal patch on the hindwing upperside. Adults have been recorded in February.

The larvae probably feed on Vitis species.
