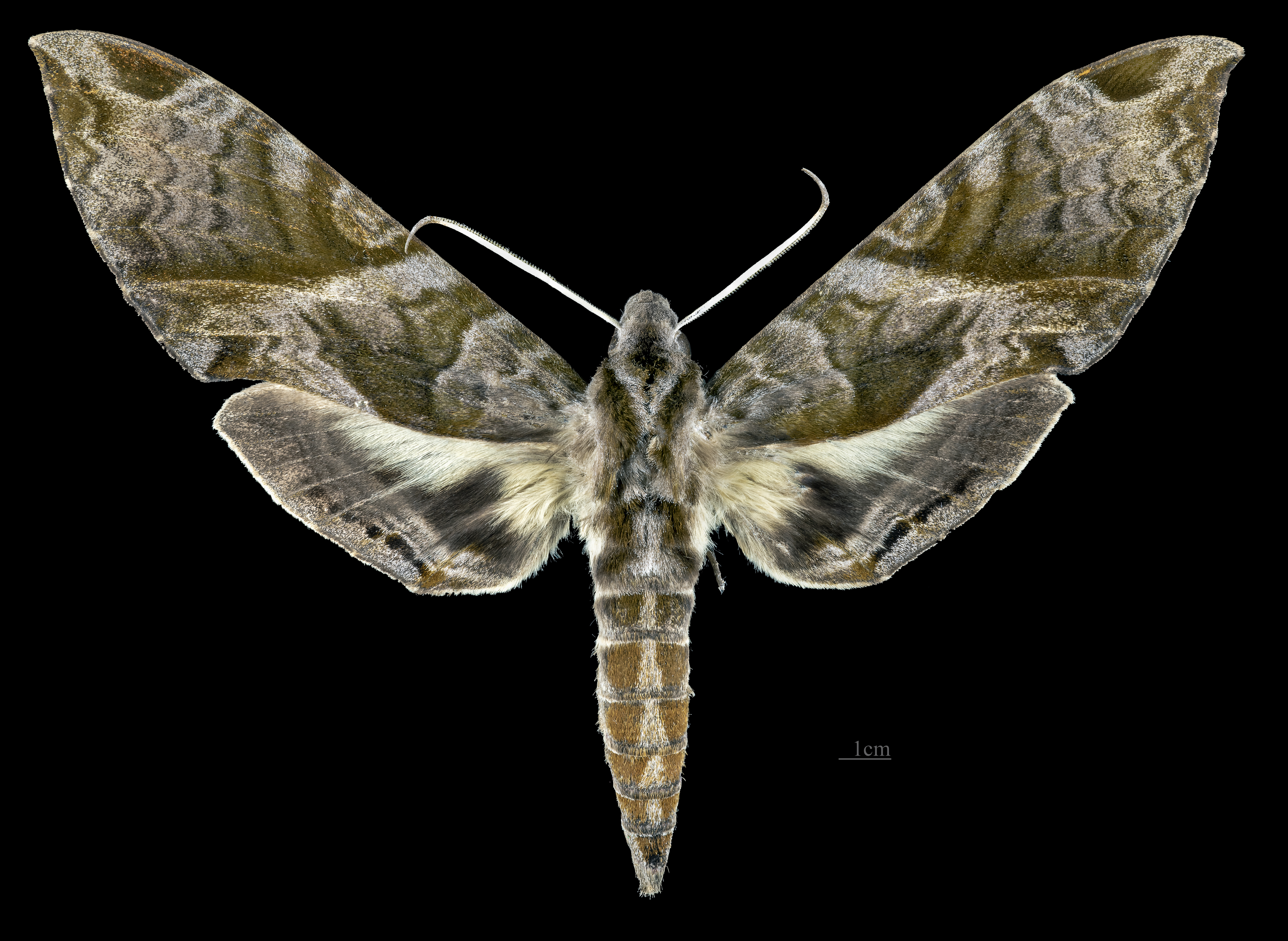
- Eumorpha cissi Male dorsal
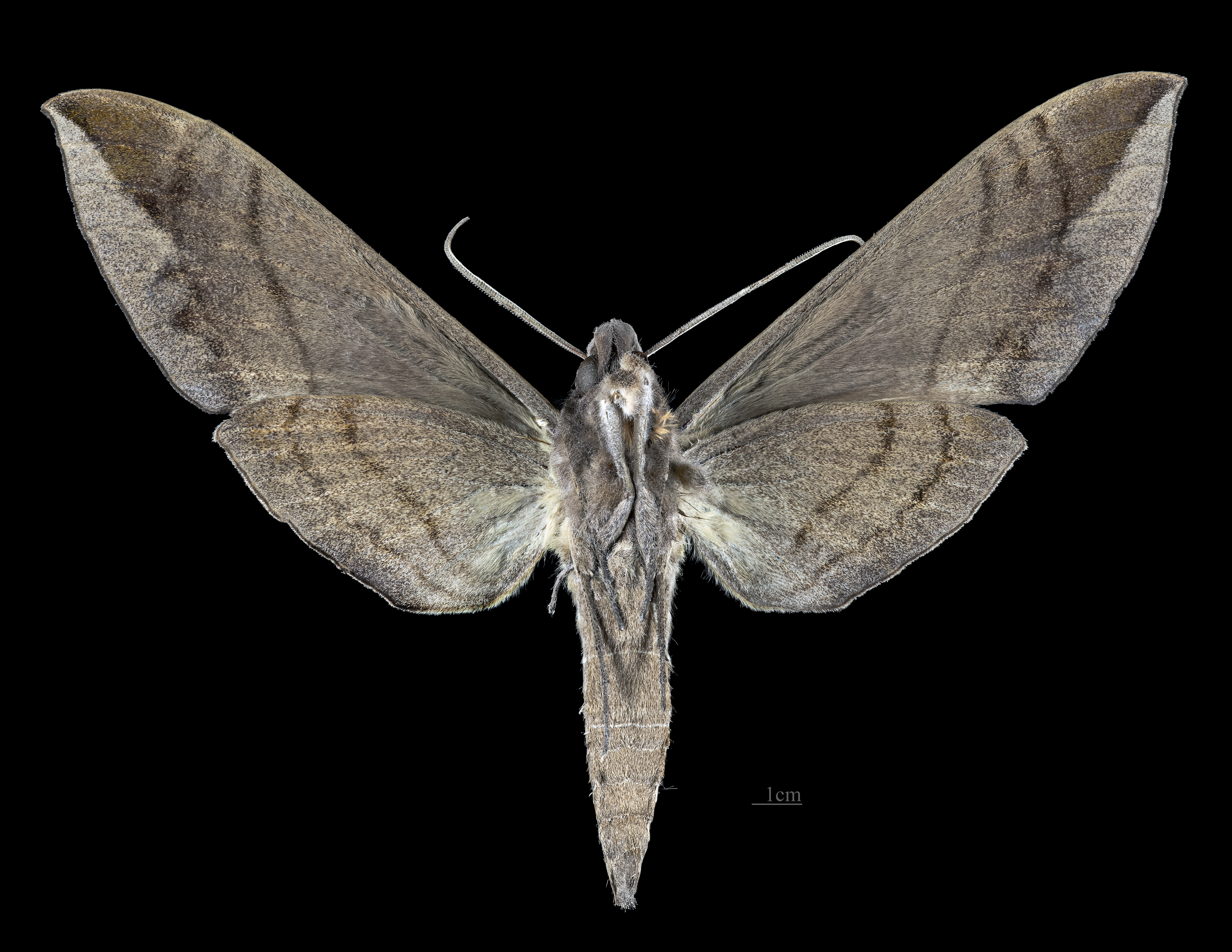
- Eumorpha cissi Male ventral

Scientific classification
- Domain: Eukaryota
- Kingdom: Animalia
- Phylum: Arthropoda
- Class: Insecta
- Order: Lepidoptera
- Family: Sphingidae
- Genus: Eumorpha
- Species: E. cissi

Binomial name
- Eumorpha cissi (Schaufuss, 1870)

Synonyms
- Philampelus cissi Schaufuss, 1870; Philampelus vini Kirby, 1892

= Eumorpha cissi =

Species of moth

Eumorpha cissi is a moth of the family Sphingidae.

== Distribution ==
It is found from Venezuela south to Ecuador, Peru, Bolivia and north-western Argentina.

== Description ==
It is similar to Eumorpha anchemolus but the upperside ground colour is dark greenish-grey and the forewing apex is more falcate. Furthermore, there is a stronger pattern of dark transverse lines and bands on the forewing upperside.

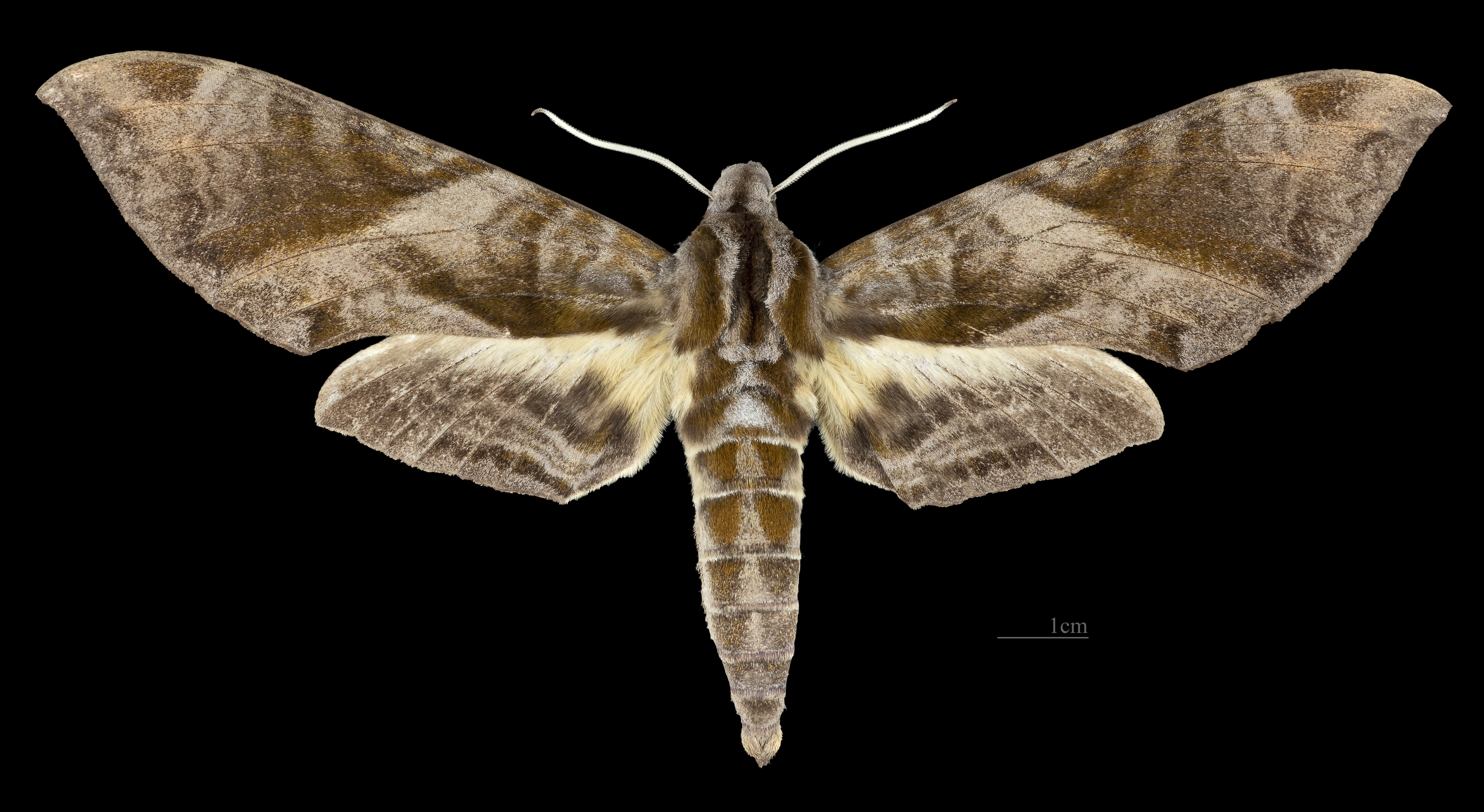
Female dorsal

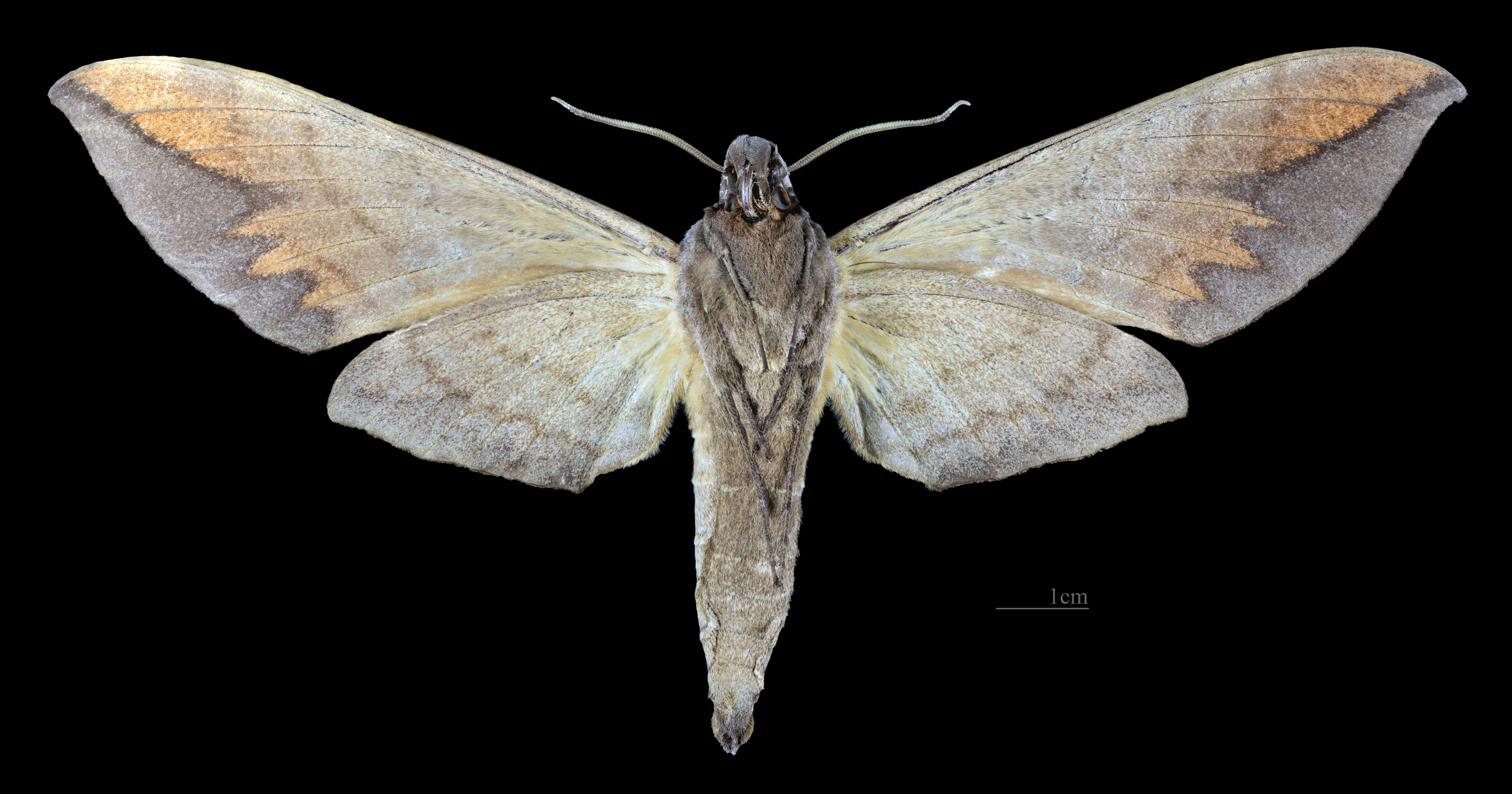
Female ventral

== Biology ==
Adults have been recorded from February to March and from October to November in Bolivia.

The larvae probably feed on grape and vine species.
