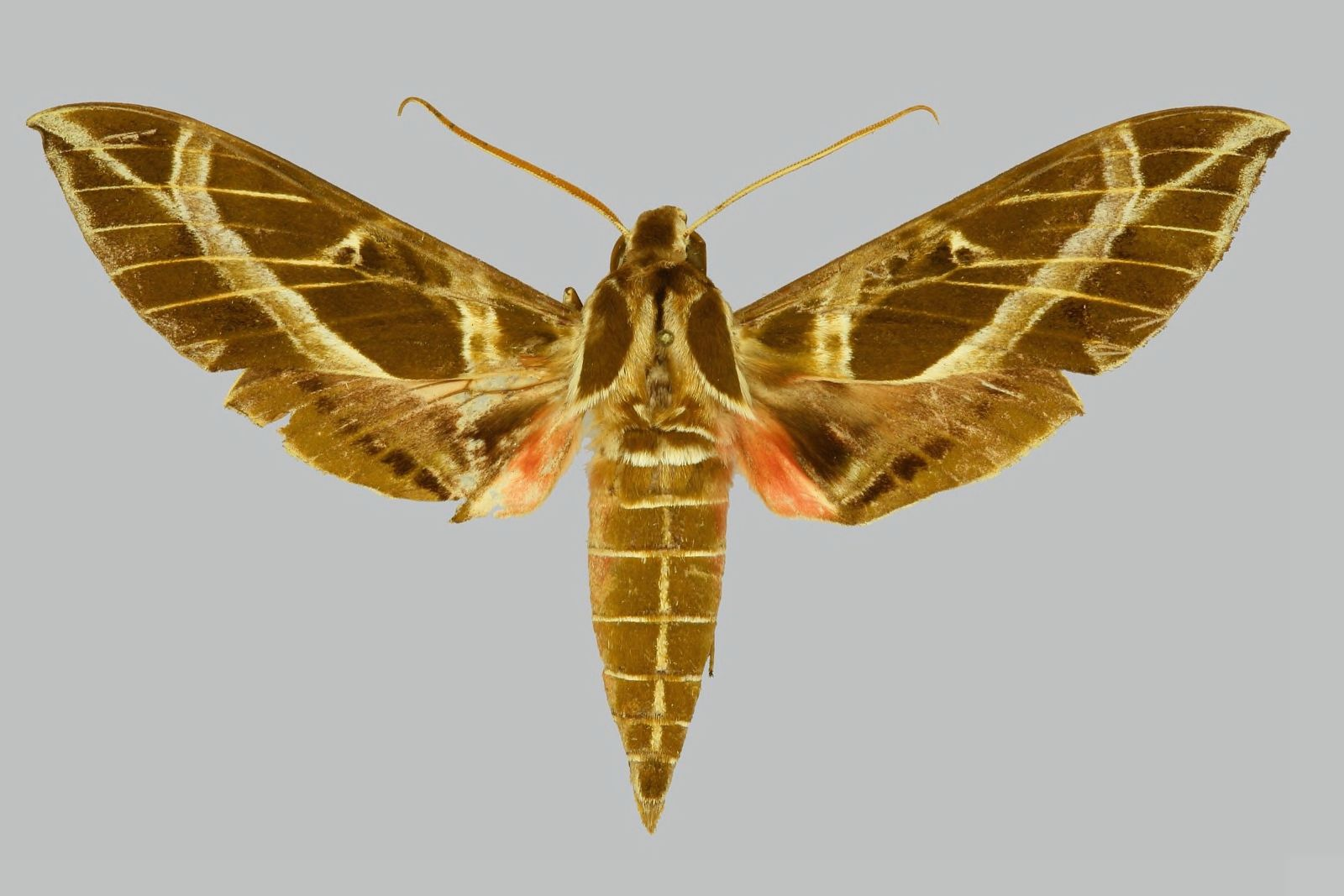

Scientific classification
- Kingdom: Animalia
- Phylum: Arthropoda
- Class: Insecta
- Order: Lepidoptera
- Family: Sphingidae
- Genus: Eumorpha
- Species: E. mirificatus

Binomial name
- Eumorpha mirificatus (Grote, 1874)

Synonyms
- Philampelus mirificatus Grote, 1874

= Eumorpha mirificatus =

Species of moth

Eumorpha mirificatus is a moth of the family Sphingidae. It is known from the western tip of Cuba.
