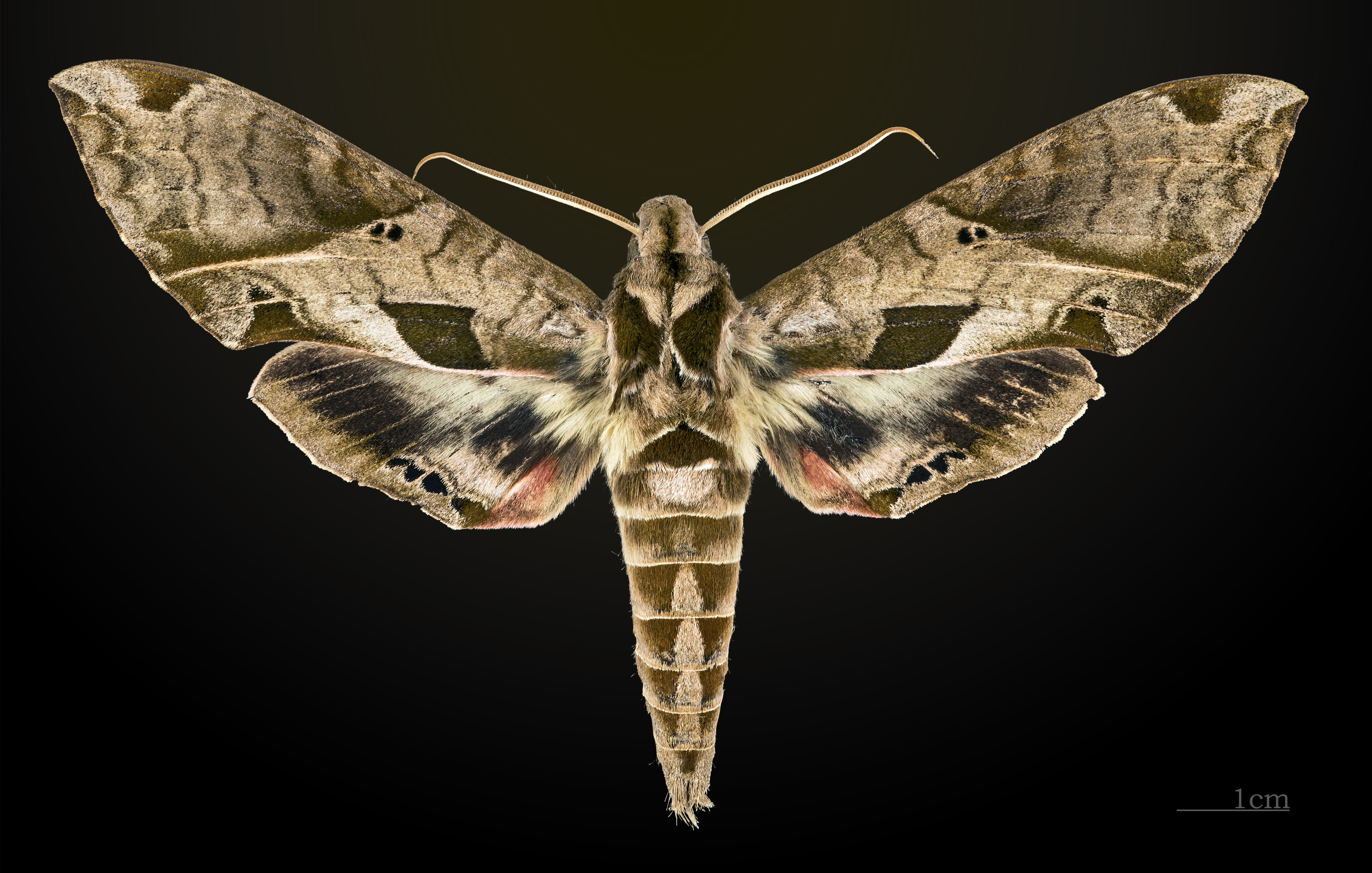
- Eumorpha satellitia ♂
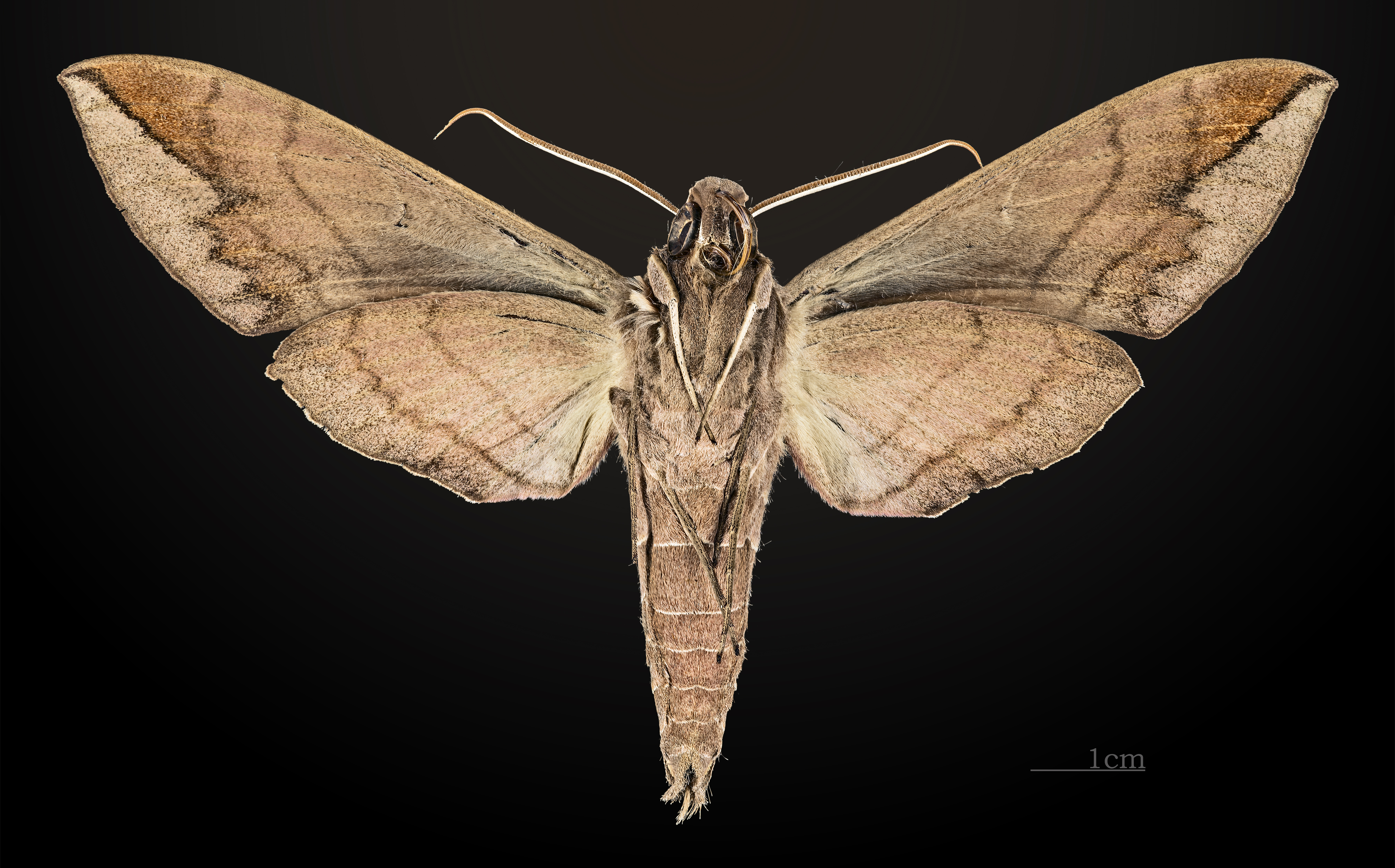
- Eumorpha satellitia ♂ △

Scientific classification
- Kingdom: Animalia
- Phylum: Arthropoda
- Clade: Pancrustacea
- Class: Insecta
- Order: Lepidoptera
- Family: Sphingidae
- Genus: Eumorpha
- Species: E. analis

Binomial name
- Eumorpha analis (Rothschild & Jordan, 1903)

Synonyms
- Pholus analis Rothschild & Jordan, 1903

= Eumorpha analis =

Species of moth

Eumorpha analis is a moth of the family Sphingidae.

== Distribution ==
It is known from Bolivia, Argentina, Paraguay, Uruguay and Brazil.

== Description ==
The upperside of the body and wings is similar to Eumorpha satellitia satellitia but the ground colour is darker and more olive-green. There is a conspicuous dark stripe on the head and thorax, running along the midline. There is a broad, dark edged, pale stripe on the abdomen, running along the midline. The hindwing upperside inner margin is pink.

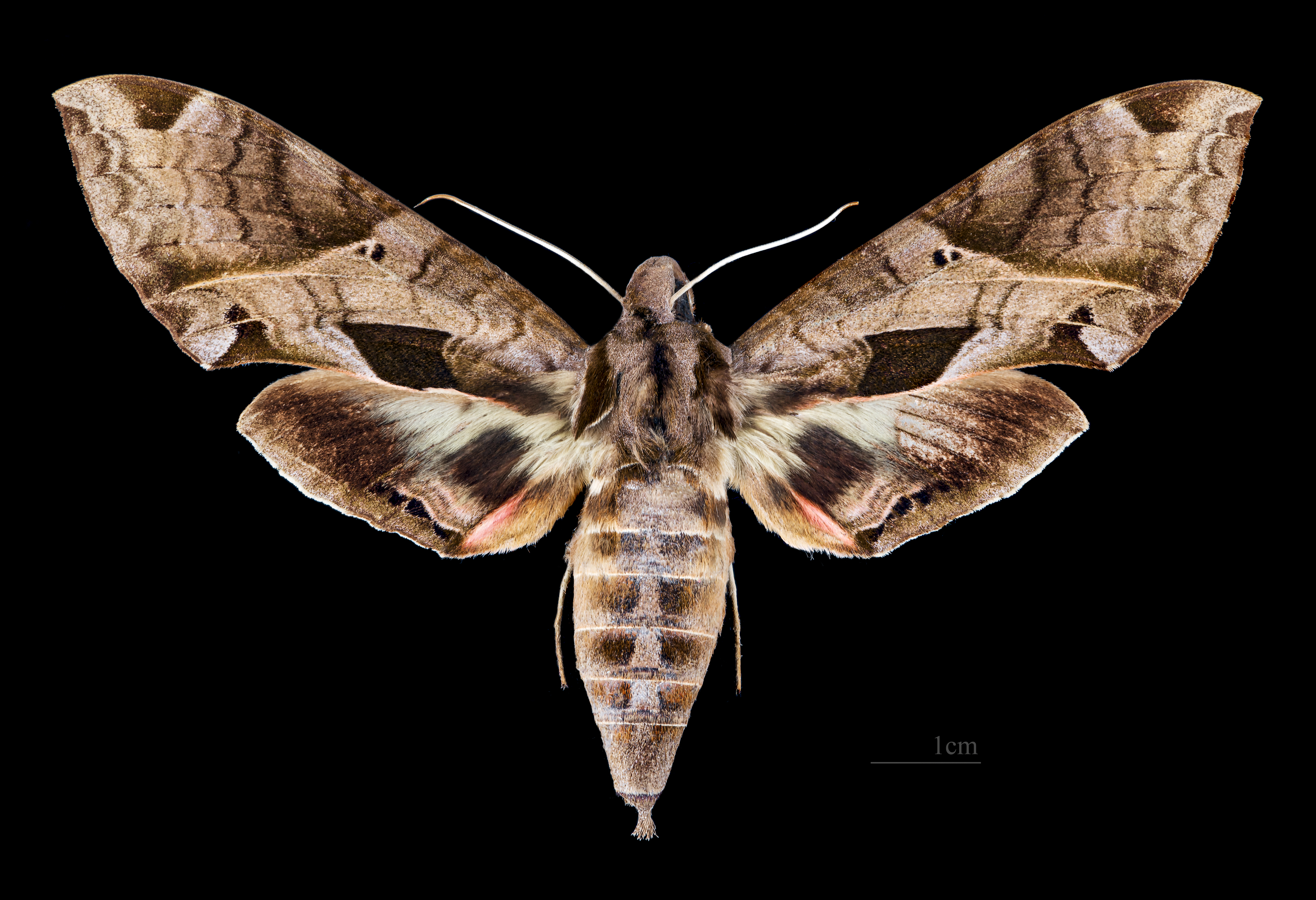
Eumorpha analis ♀

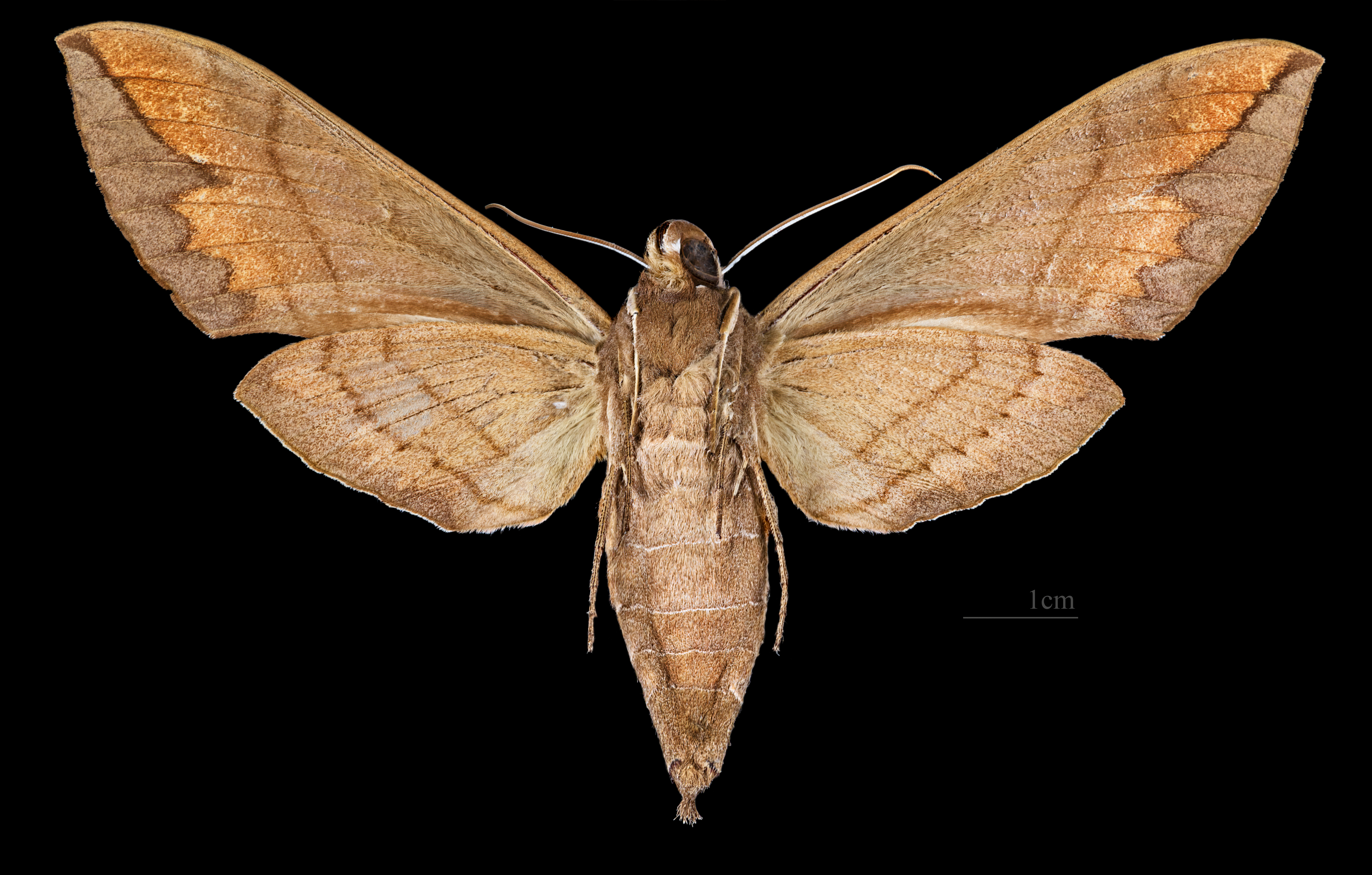
Eumorpha analis ♀ △

== Biology ==
Adults have been recorded in March and from November to December in Bolivia and in December in Argentina.

The larvae probably feed on Vitis species.
