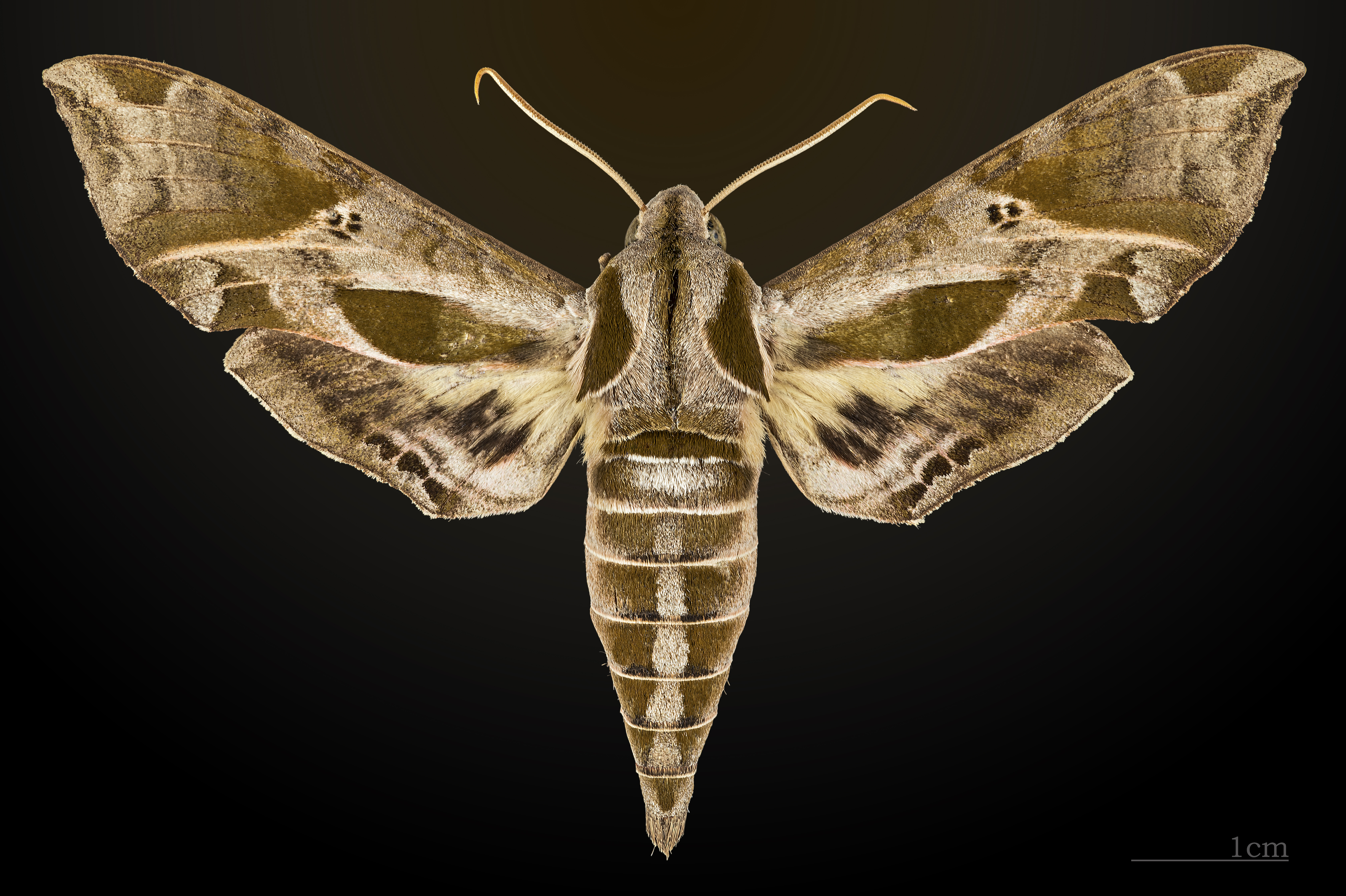
- Dorsal view
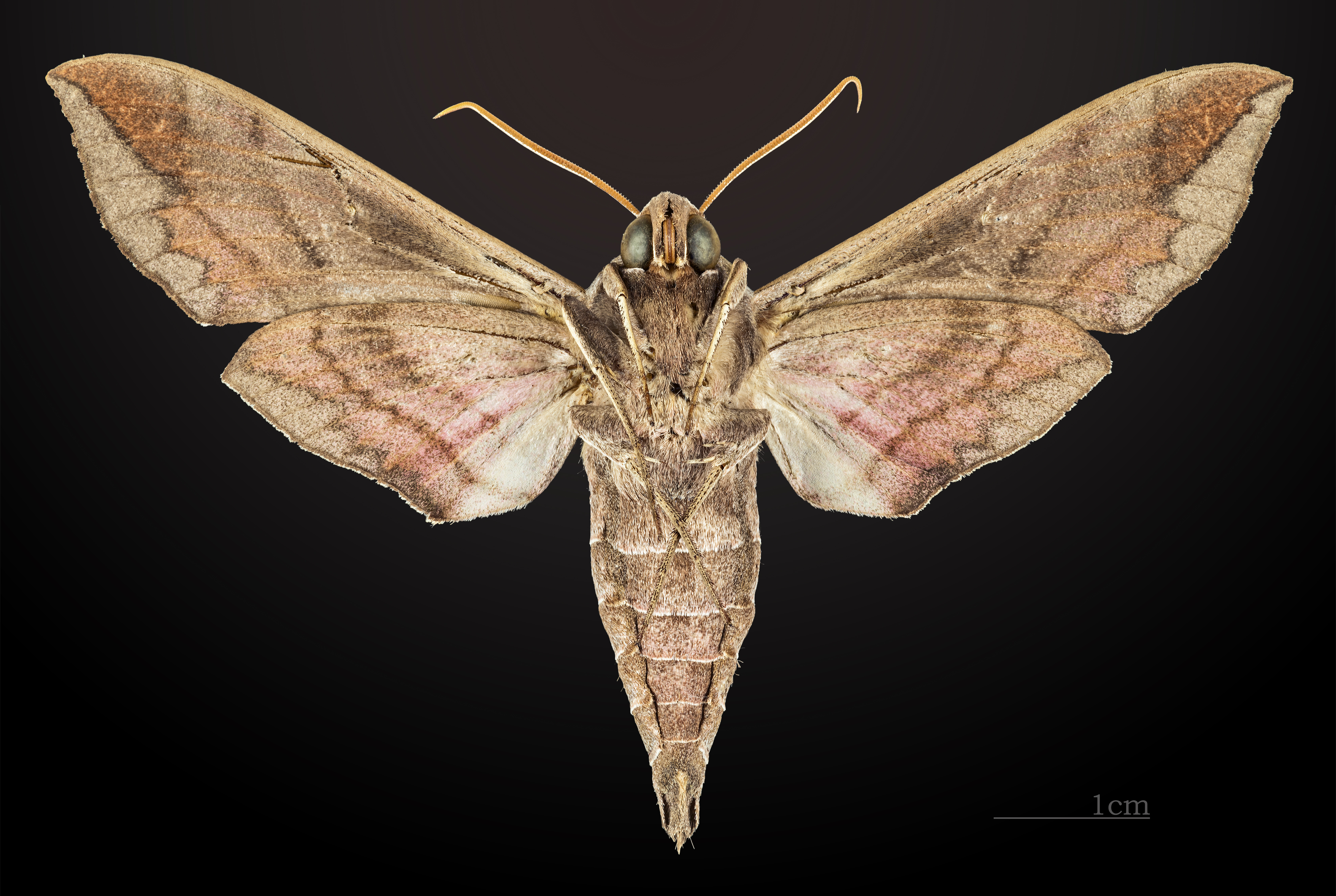
- Ventral view

Conservation status
- Secure (NatureServe)

Scientific classification
- Kingdom: Animalia
- Phylum: Arthropoda
- Clade: Pancrustacea
- Class: Insecta
- Order: Lepidoptera
- Family: Sphingidae
- Genus: Eumorpha
- Species: E. satellitia

Binomial name
- Eumorpha satellitia (Linnaeus, 1771)

Synonyms
- Sphinx satellitia Linnaeus, 1771; Pholus cinnamomea Cary, 1951; Pholus macasensis Clark, 1922; Philampelus satellitia posticatus Grote, 1865; Pholus satellitia excessus Gehlen, 1926; Pholus satellitia rosea Brou, 1980; Sphinx satellitia licaon Cramer, 1775

= Eumorpha satellitia =

Satellite sphinx

Species of moth

Eumorpha satellitia, the satellite sphinx, is a moth of the family Sphingidae. The family was first described by Carl Linnaeus in 1771. It lives from Brazil and northern Argentina north through Central America, Mexico, and the West Indies to south Texas and southern Arizona.

The wingspan is 114–134 mm. Adults are on wing from April to August and then again in October. They feed on the nectar of various flowers, including Petunia hybrida, Saponaria officinalis and Lychnis alba.

The larvae feed on Cissus pseudosicyoides and Cissus rhombifolia. Pupation takes place underground.

== Subspecies ==
- Eumorpha satellitia satellitia (Jamaica and from Mexico, Belize, Guatemala to Ecuador and further south into Bolivia, Brazil and Uruguay)
- Eumorpha satellitia excessus (Gehlen, 1926) (Brazil)
- Eumorpha satellitia licaon (Cramer, 1775) (extreme southern Texas, Mexico, Nicaragua and Costa Rica south to Brazil to Bolivia and Paraguay)
- Eumorpha satellitia posticatus (Grote, 1865) (Cuba and the Bahamas)

== Gallery ==
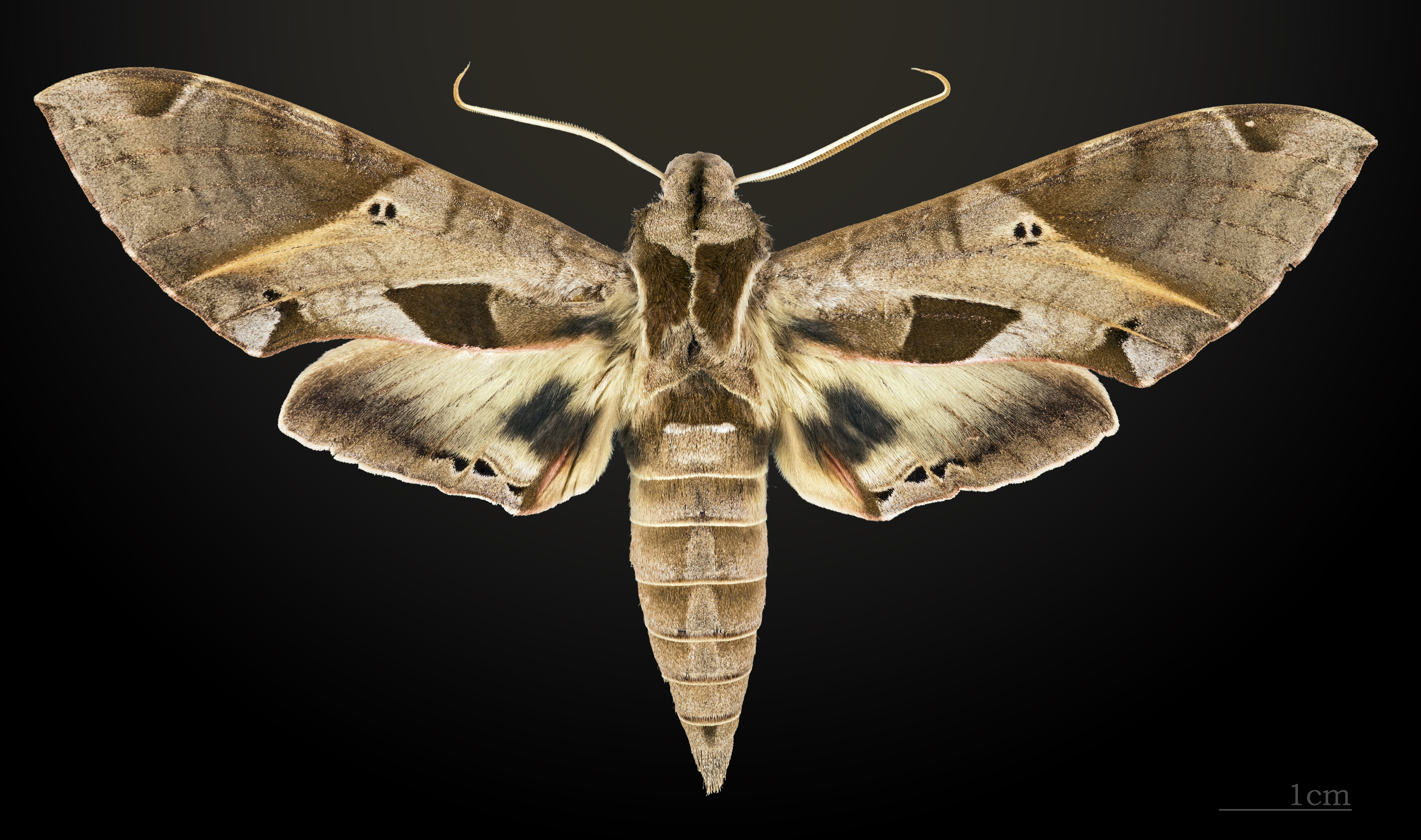
E. s. excessus - dorsal view

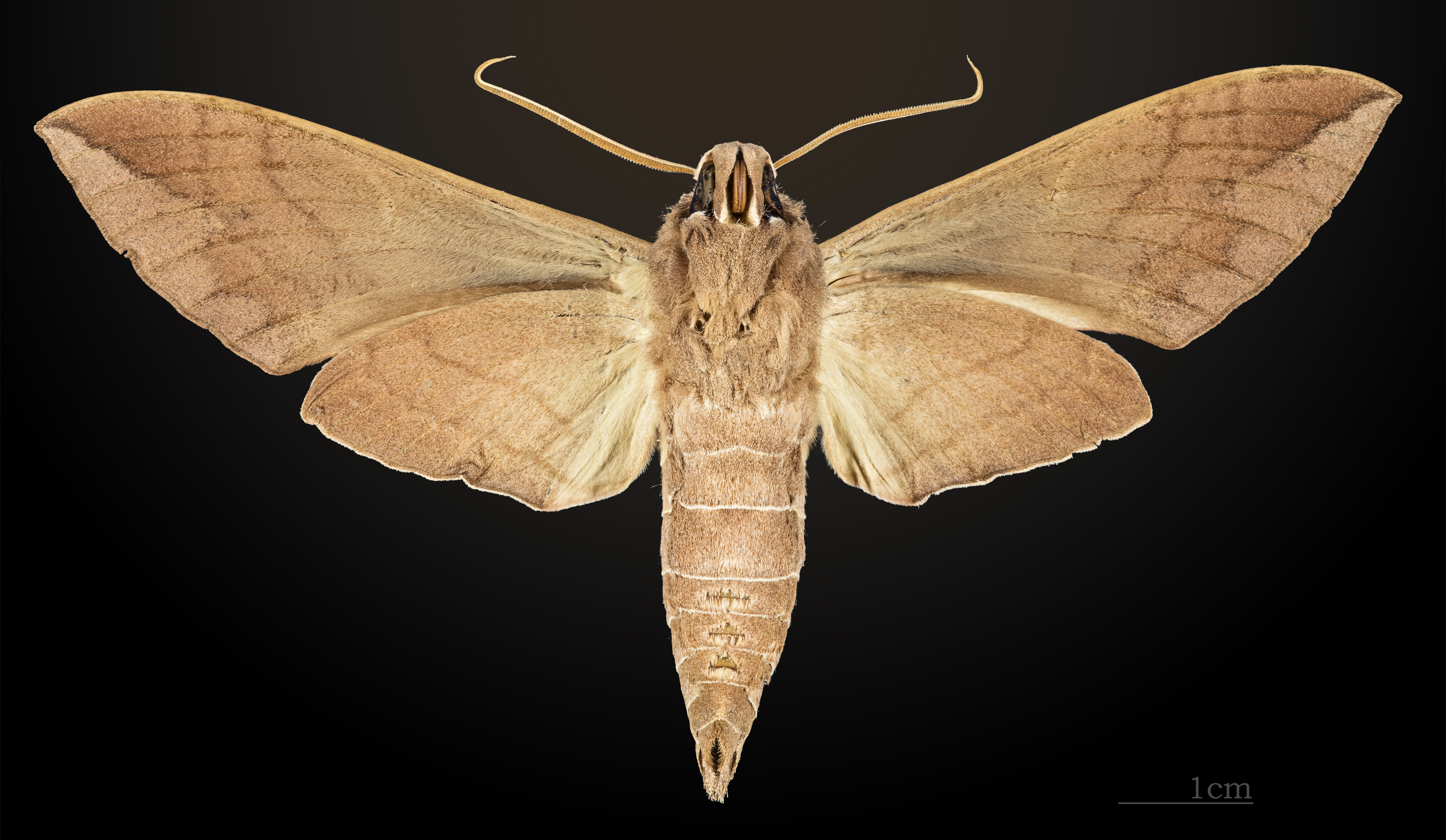
E. s. excessus - ventral view

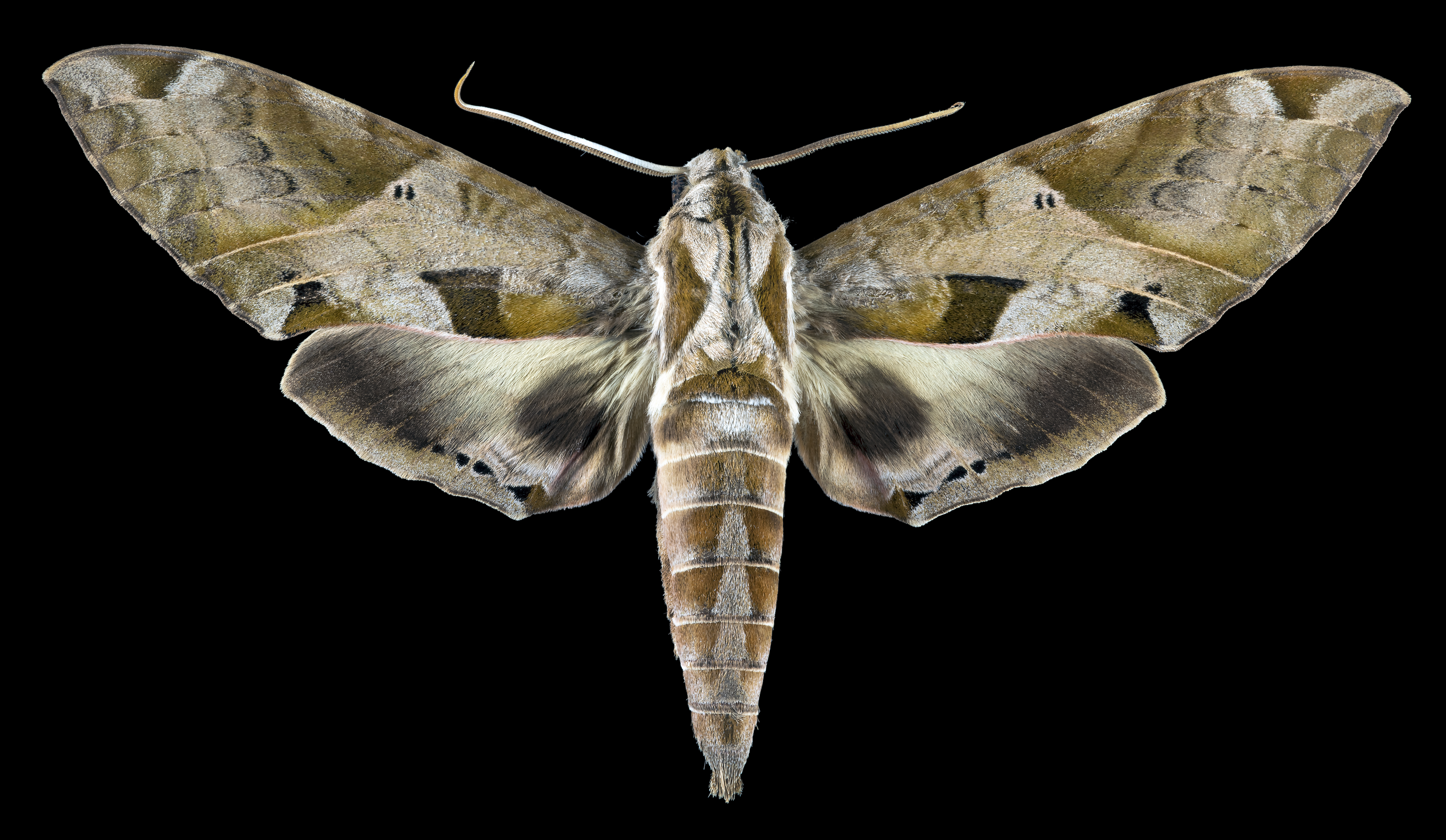
E. s. licaon Male - dorsal view

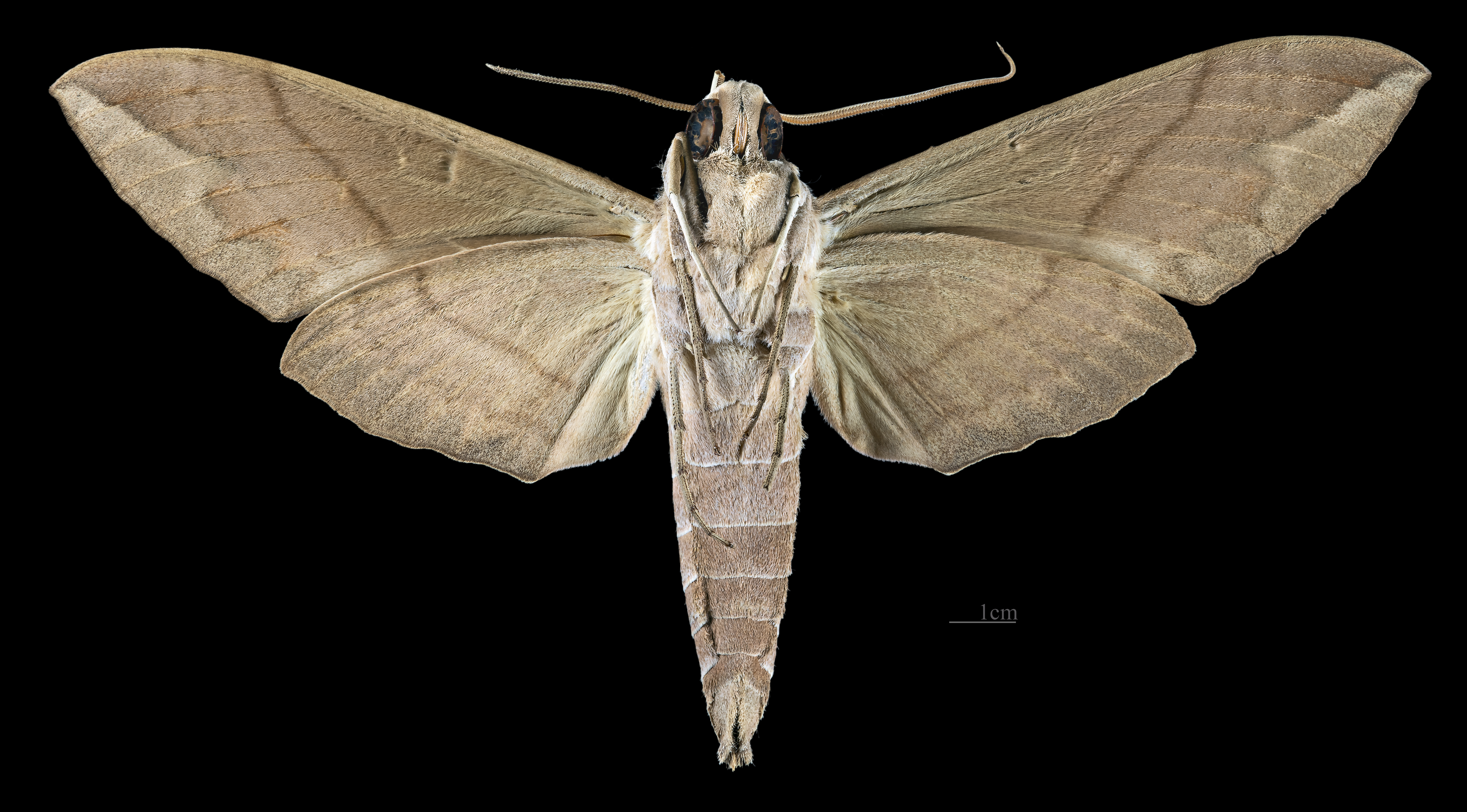
E. s. licaon Male - ventral view

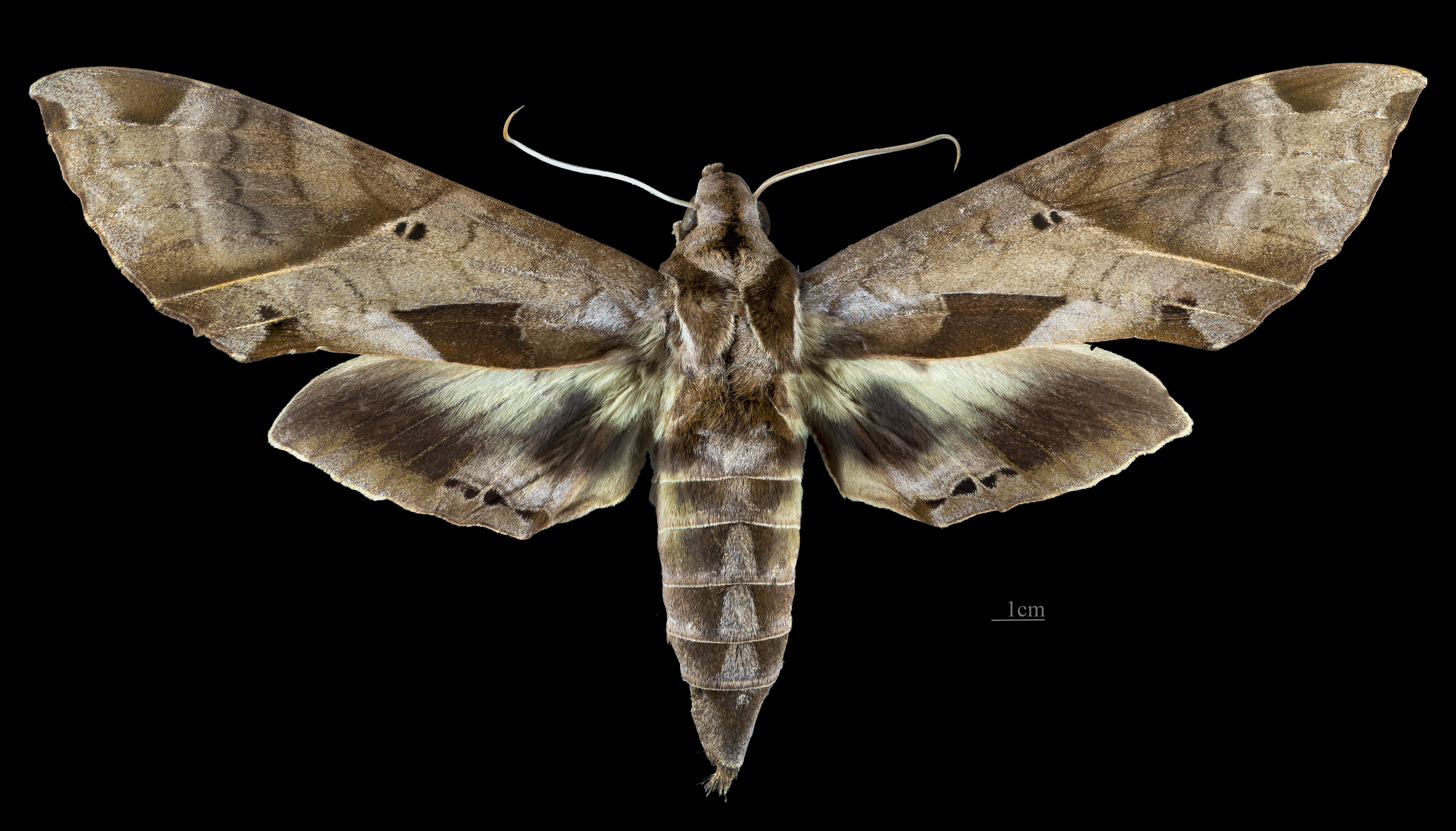
E. s. licaon female - dorsal view

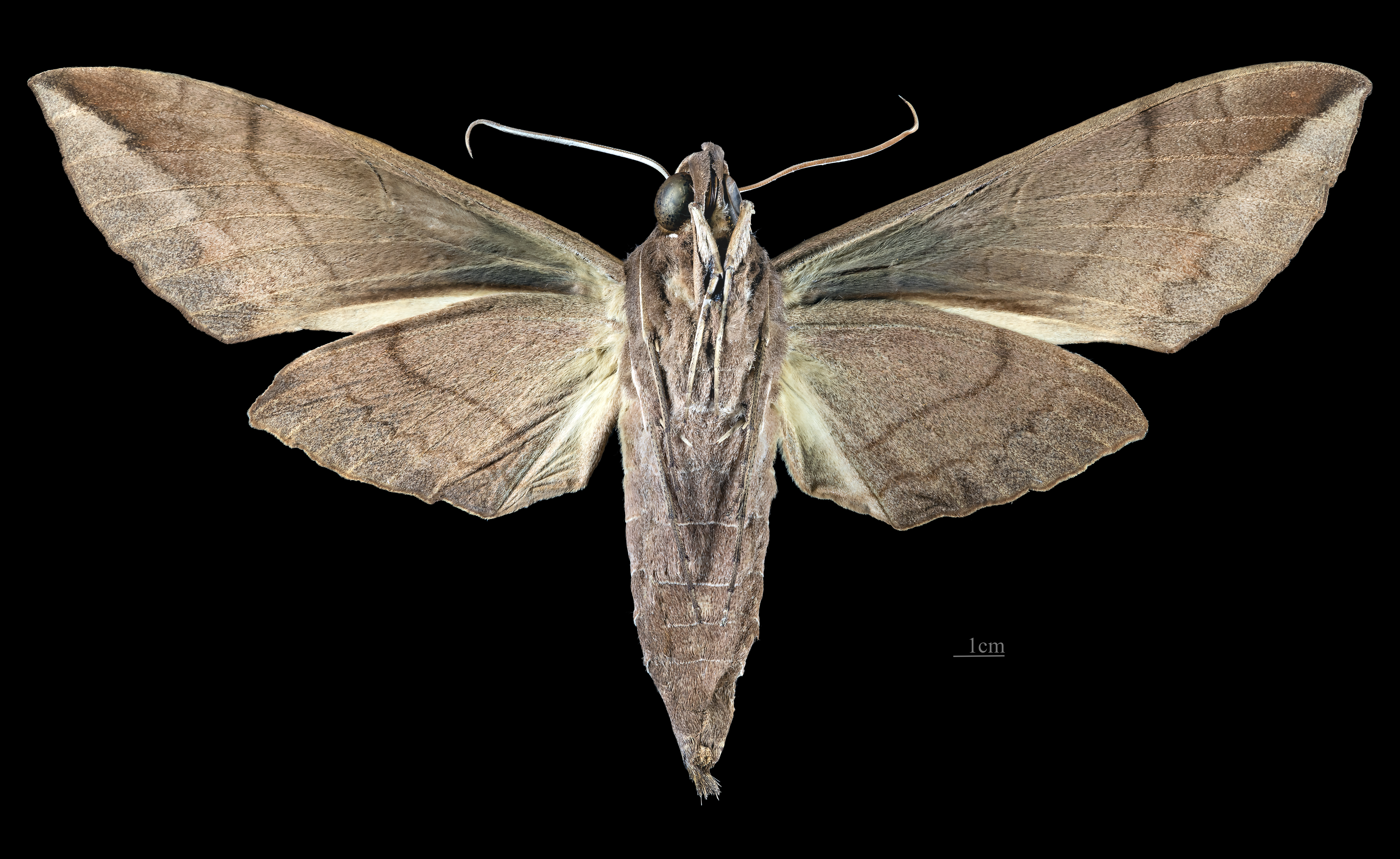
E. s. licaon female - ventral view

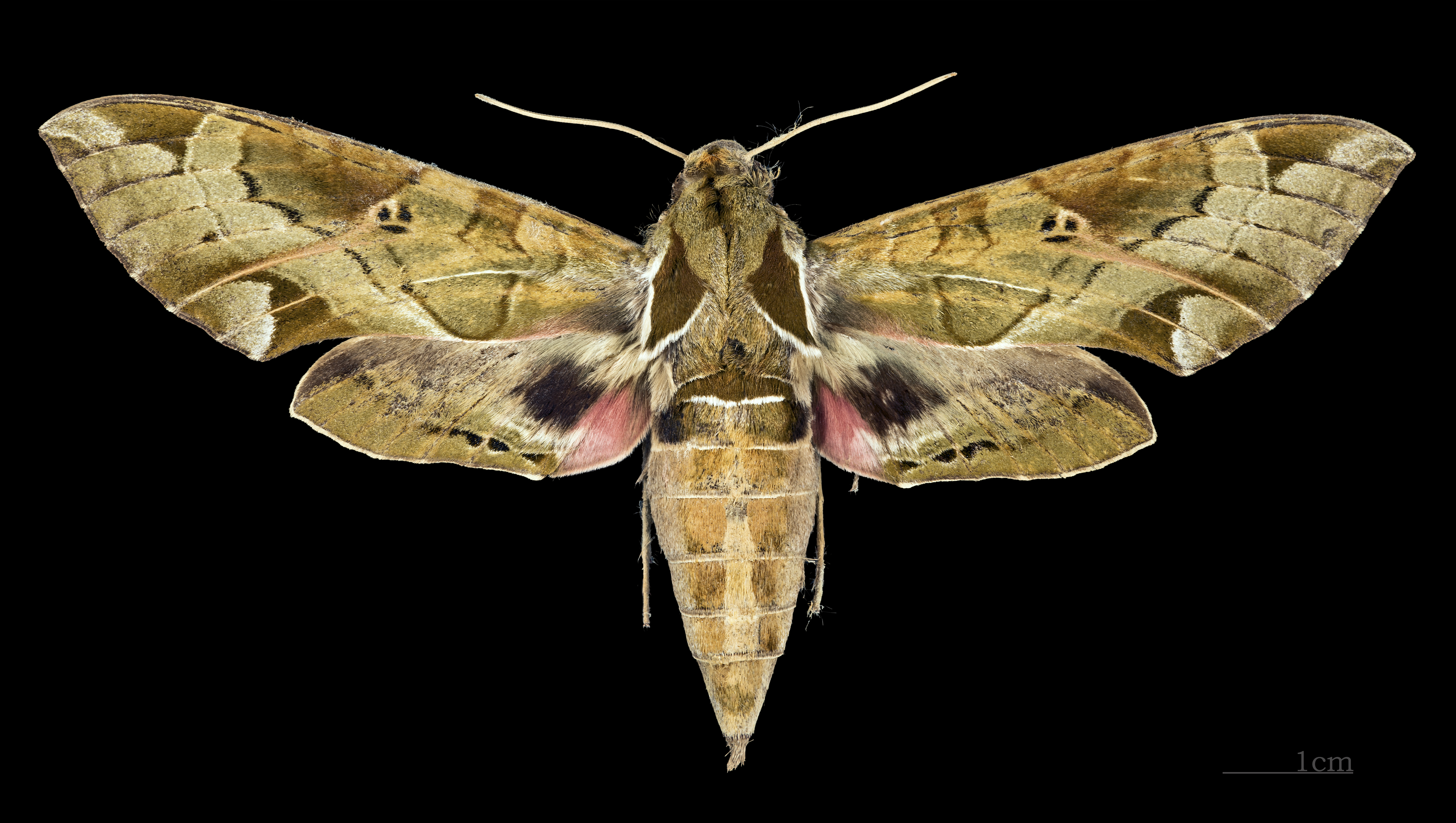
Female E. s. posticatus - Female dorsal view

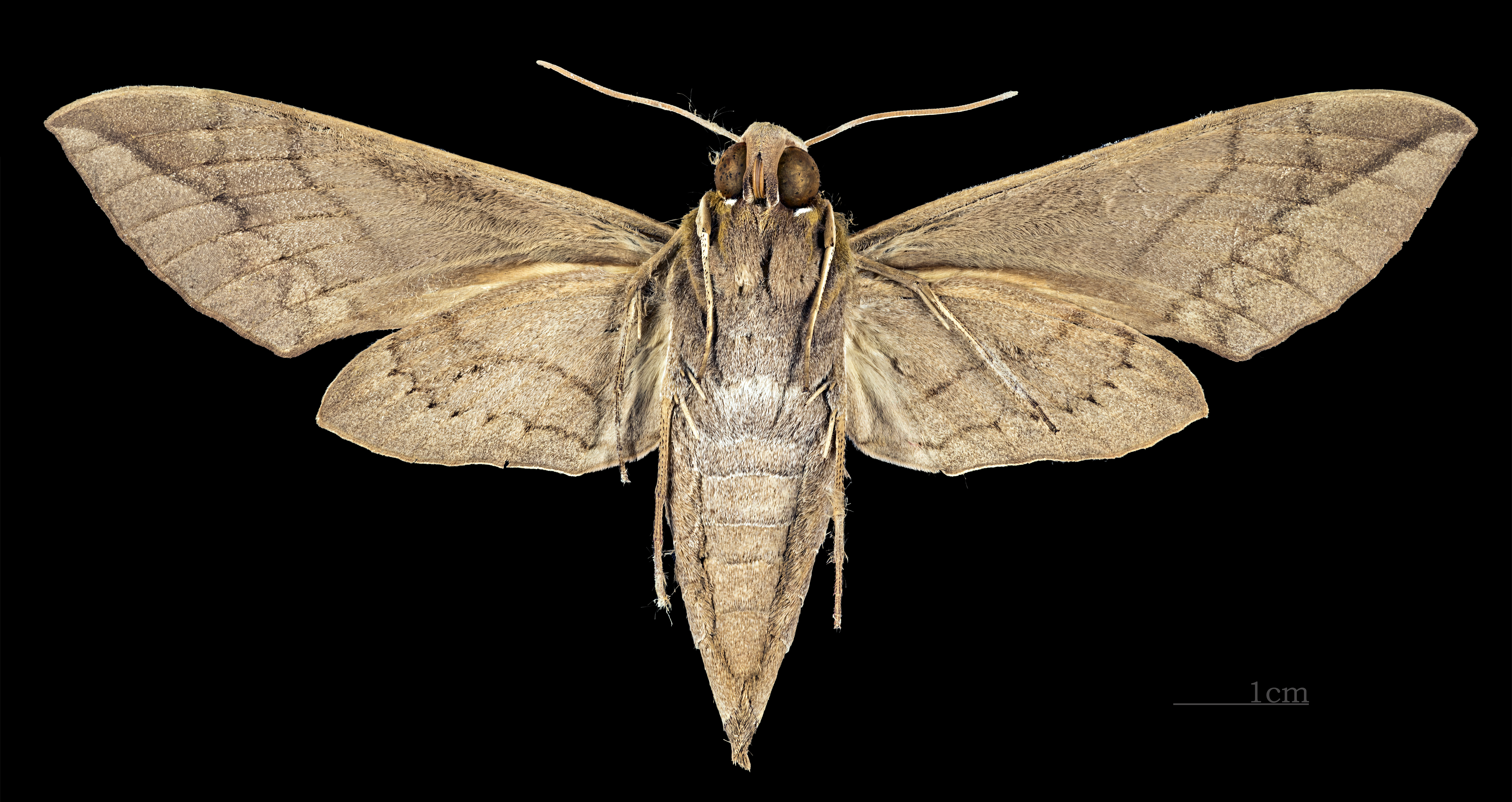
Female E. s. posticatus - Female ventral view

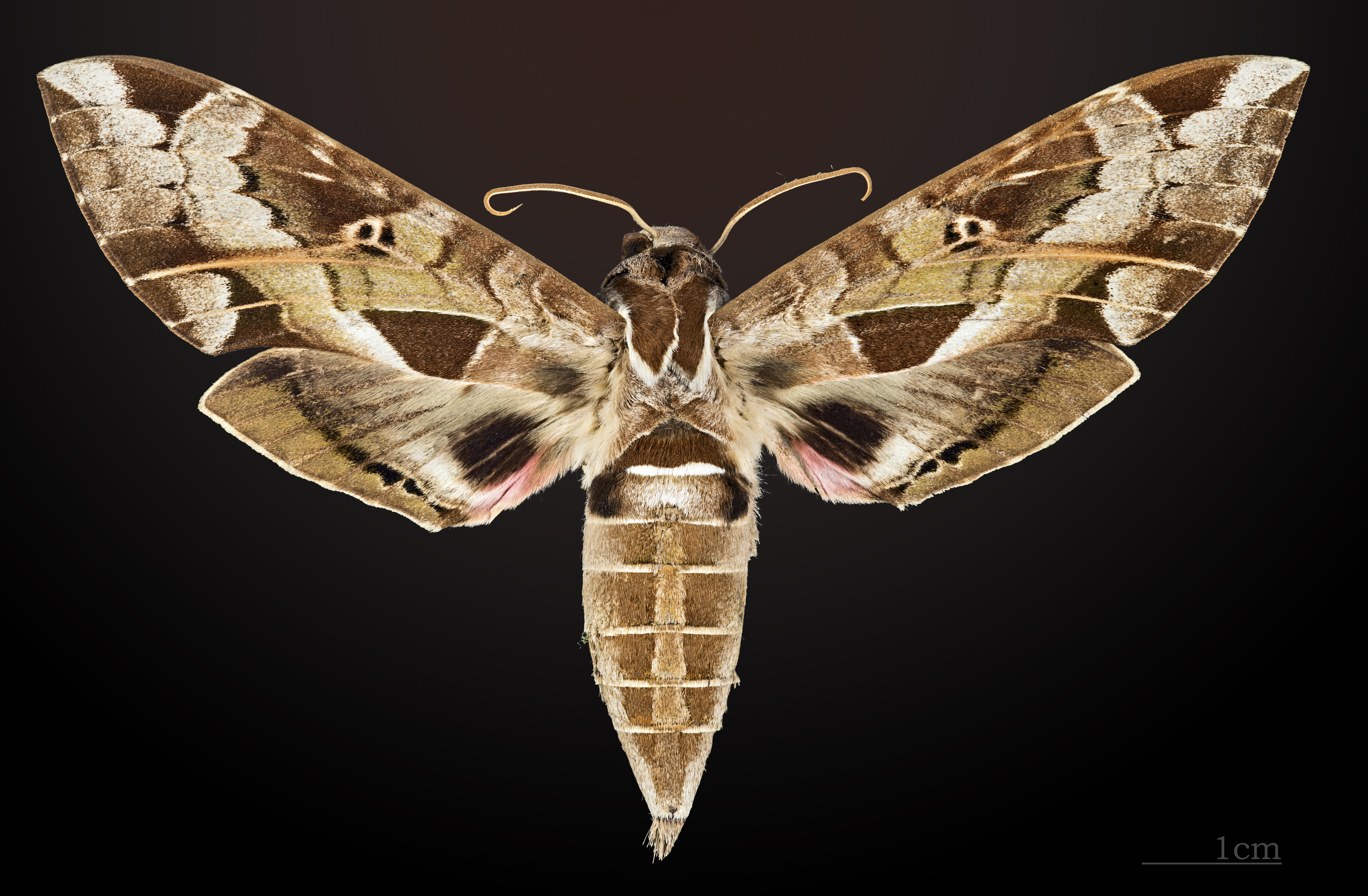
Male E. s. posticatus - Male dorsal view

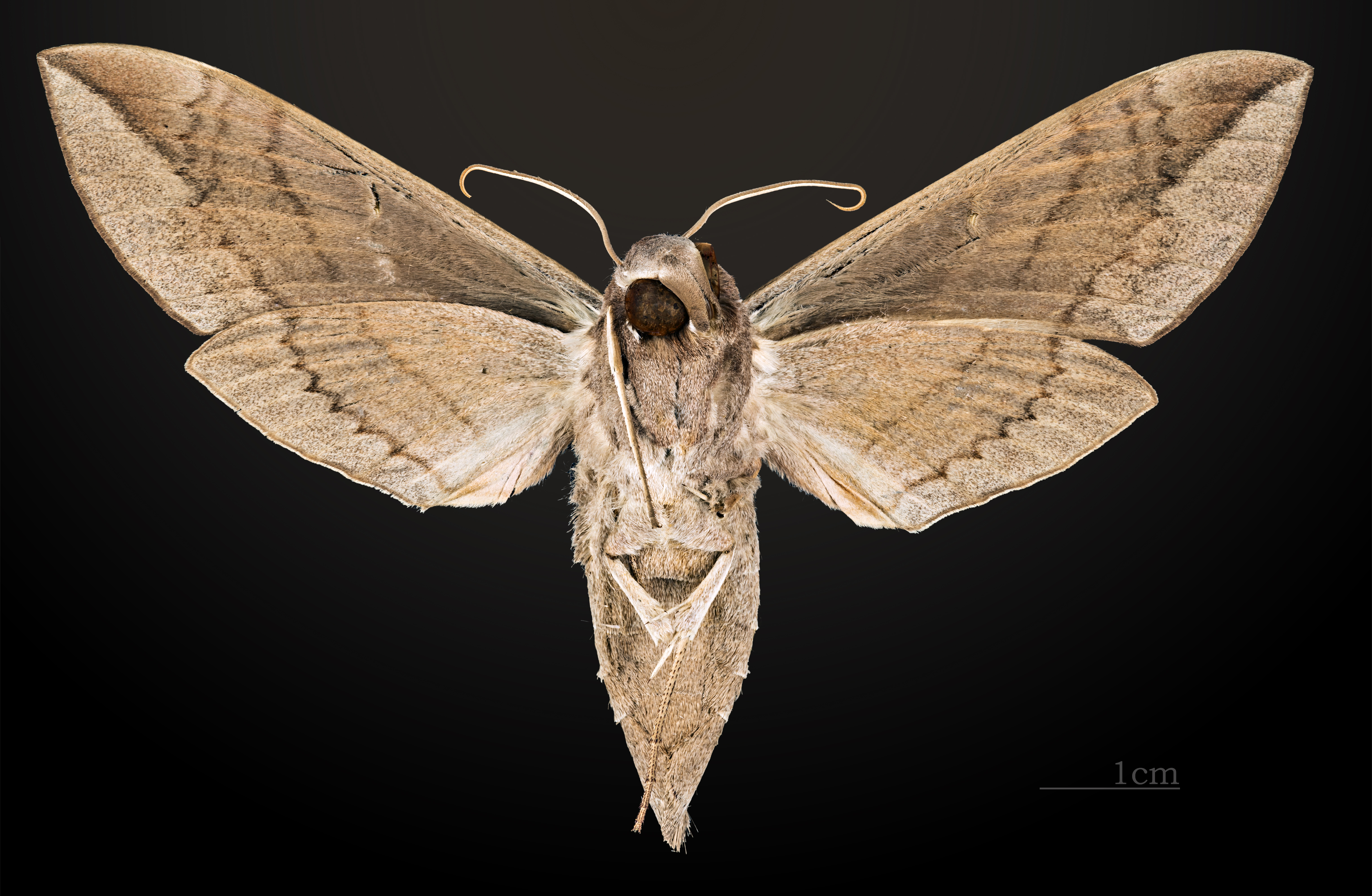
Male E. s. posticatus - Male ventral view
