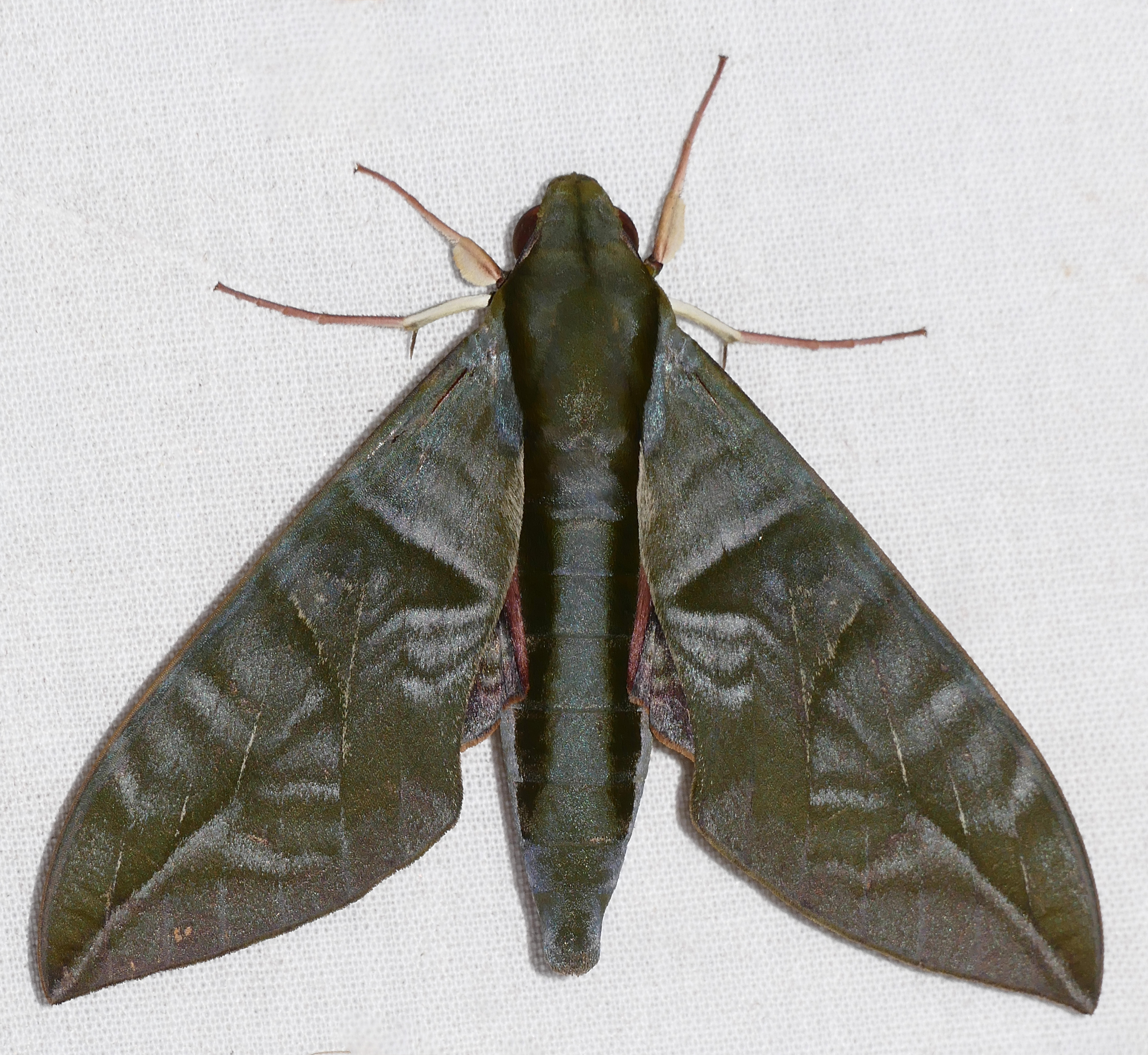
- Eumorpha phorbas, adult

Scientific classification
- Domain: Eukaryota
- Kingdom: Animalia
- Phylum: Arthropoda
- Class: Insecta
- Order: Lepidoptera
- Family: Sphingidae
- Genus: Eumorpha
- Species: E. phorbas

Binomial name
- Eumorpha phorbas (Cramer, 1775)

Synonyms
- Sphinx phorbas Cramer, 1775; Sphinx pandion Stoll, 1780

= Eumorpha phorbas =

Species of moth

Eumorpha phorbas is a moth of the family Sphingidae.

== Distribution ==
It is known from Ecuador, Colombia, Suriname, Bolivia, Guatemala, Nicaragua, Costa Rica, Belize and Mexico.

== Description ==
The wingspan is 112–116 mm. It is similar to Eumorpha labruscae labruscae in the largely green upperside of the body and forewings, but can be distinguished by the lacking blue patches on the hindwing upperside, instead showing essentially the same pattern of orange and dark brown as in Eumorpha capronnieri. There is a pair of broad, brown subdorsal stripes on the upperside of the thorax and abdomen. The undersides of the wings and body are almost entirely yellow.

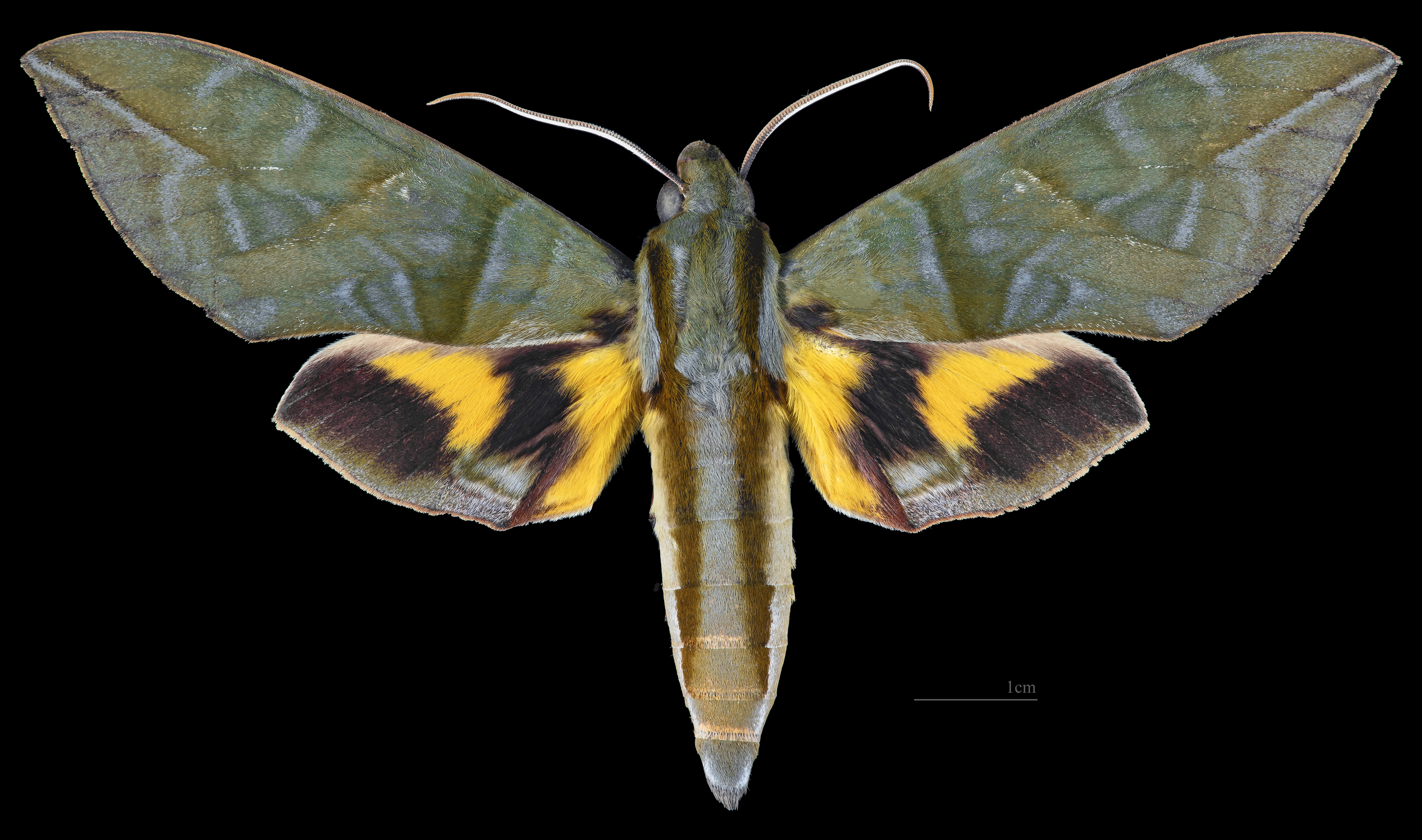
Eumorpha phorbas ♂

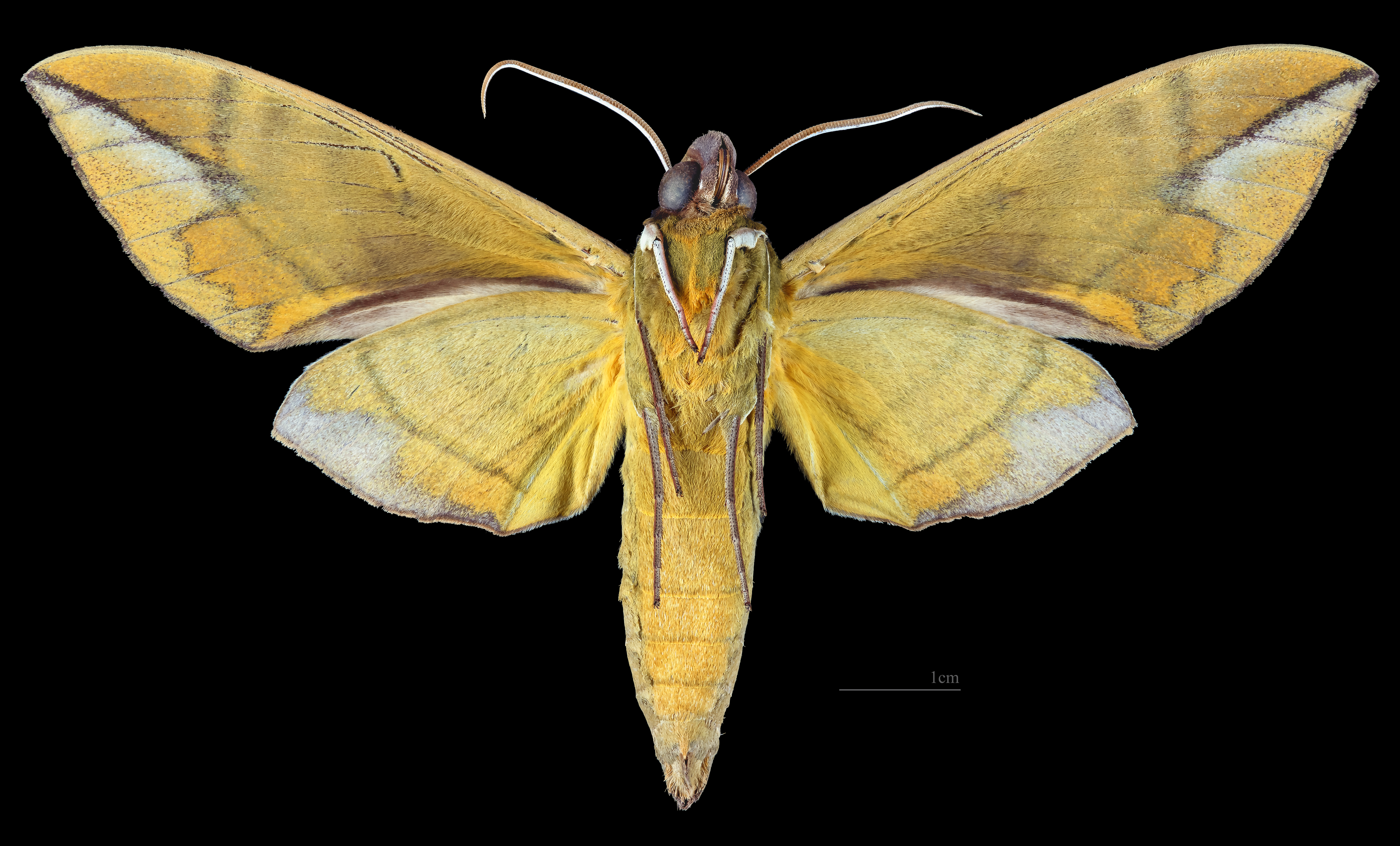
Eumorpha phorbas ♂ △

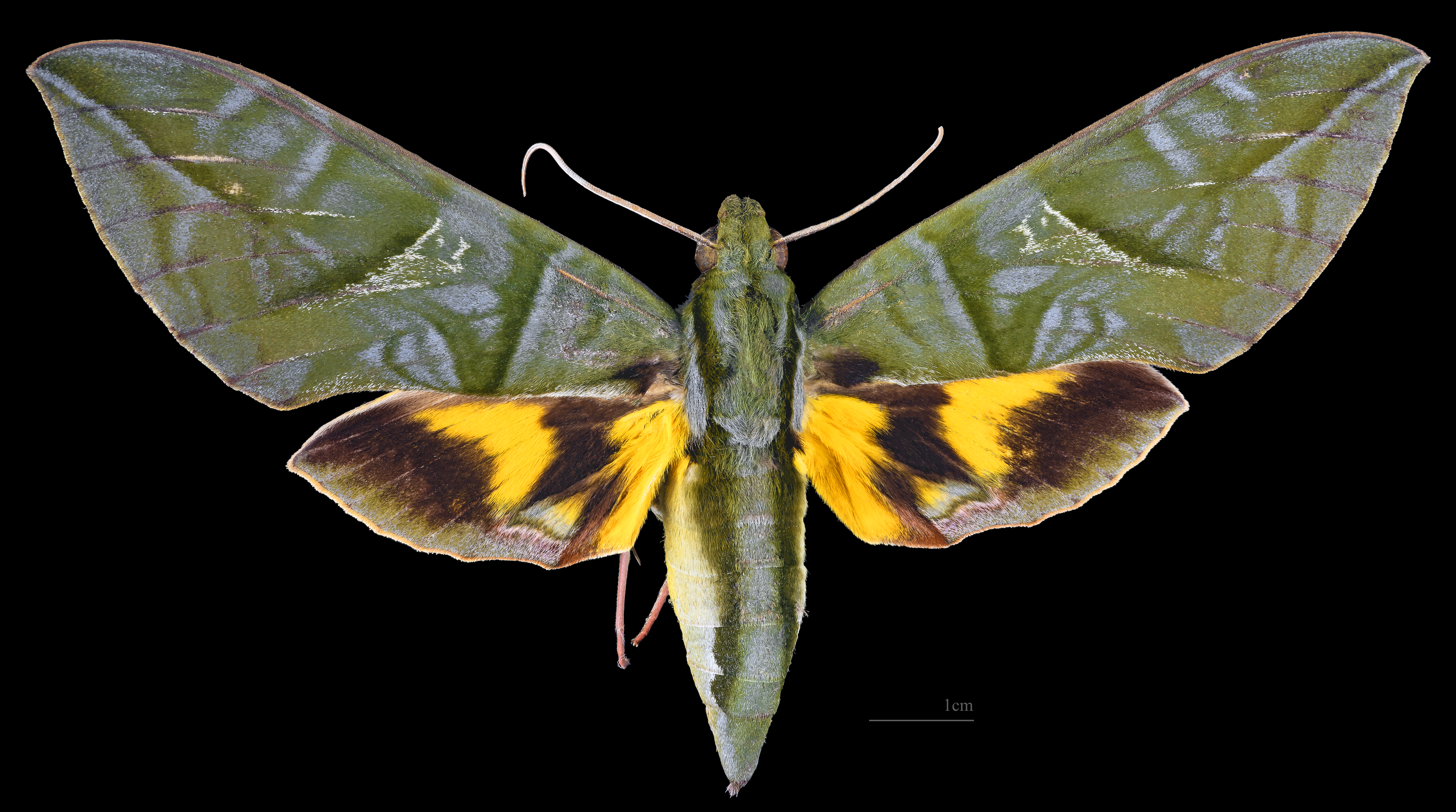
Eumorpha phorbas ♀

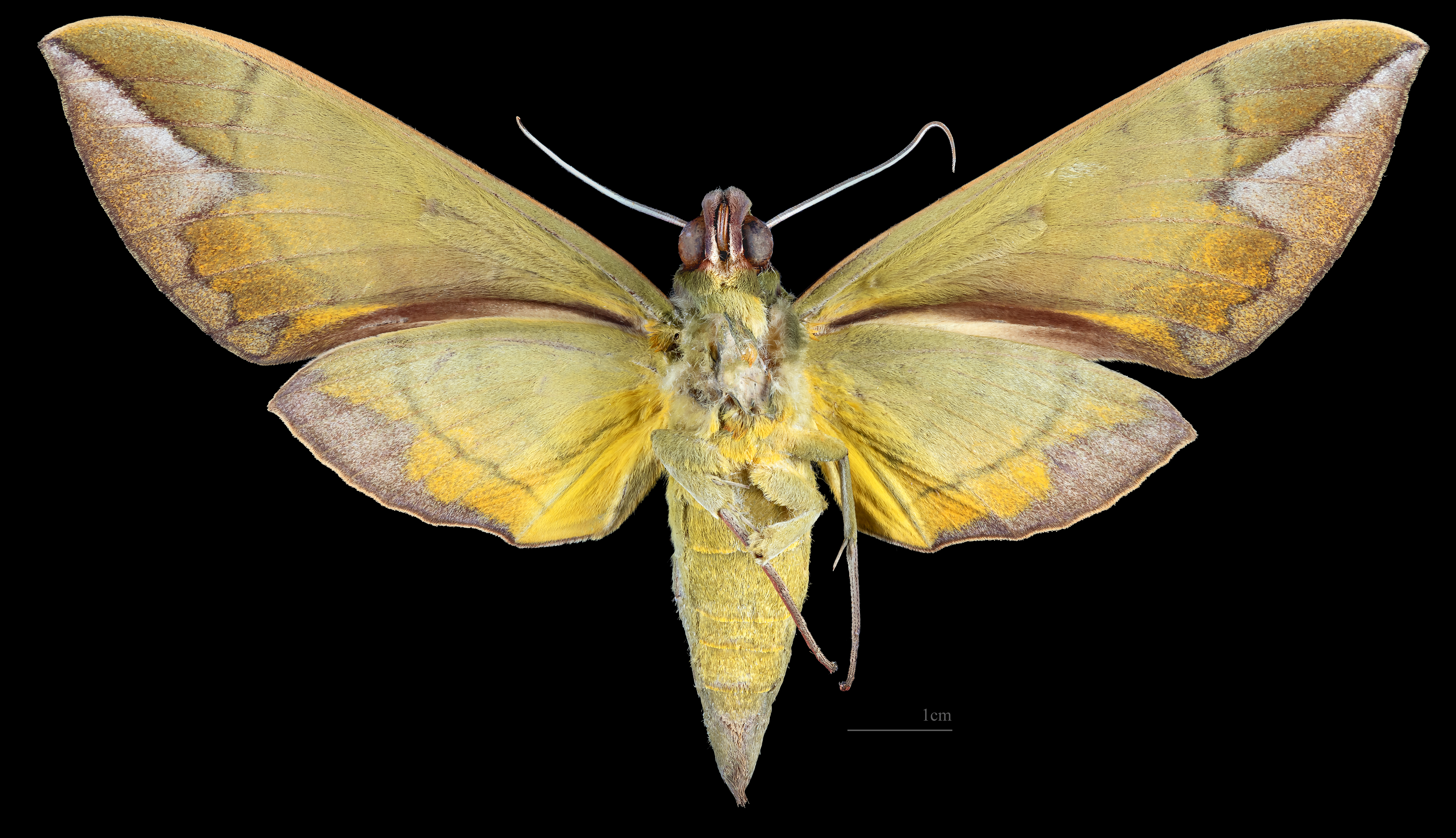
Eumorpha phorbas ♀ △

== Biology ==
Adults are on wing year round. They nectar at various flowers.

The larvae probably feed on Vitaceae, Apocynaceae or Onagraceae species.
