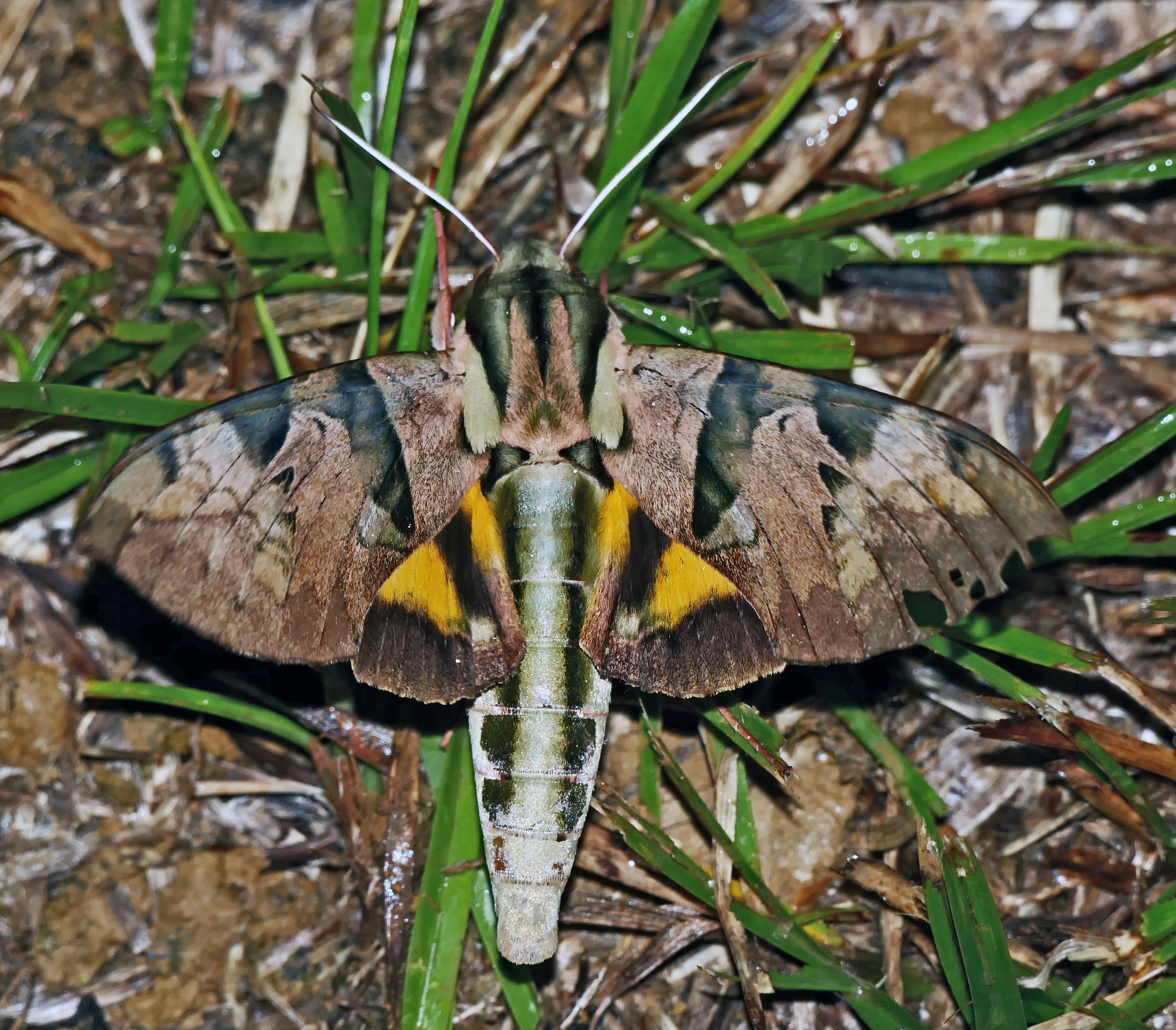

Scientific classification
- Domain: Eukaryota
- Kingdom: Animalia
- Phylum: Arthropoda
- Class: Insecta
- Order: Lepidoptera
- Family: Sphingidae
- Genus: Eumorpha
- Species: E. capronnieri

Binomial name
- Eumorpha capronnieri (Boisduval, 1875)

Synonyms
- Philampelus capronnieri Boisduval, 1875

= Eumorpha capronnieri =

Species of moth

Eumorpha capronnieri is a moth of the family Sphingidae first described by Jean Baptiste Boisduval in 1875.

== Distribution ==
It is found from French Guiana to southern Nicaragua, Costa Rica and probably Panama. Southwards it is found up to Bolivia and northern Argentina.

== Description ==
The wingspan is 102–106 mm. It is similar to Eumorpha phorbas, but can be distinguished by the forewing upperside pattern of mottled green and brown areas. Furthermore, the underside of the wings and body is less yellow, especially in the female.

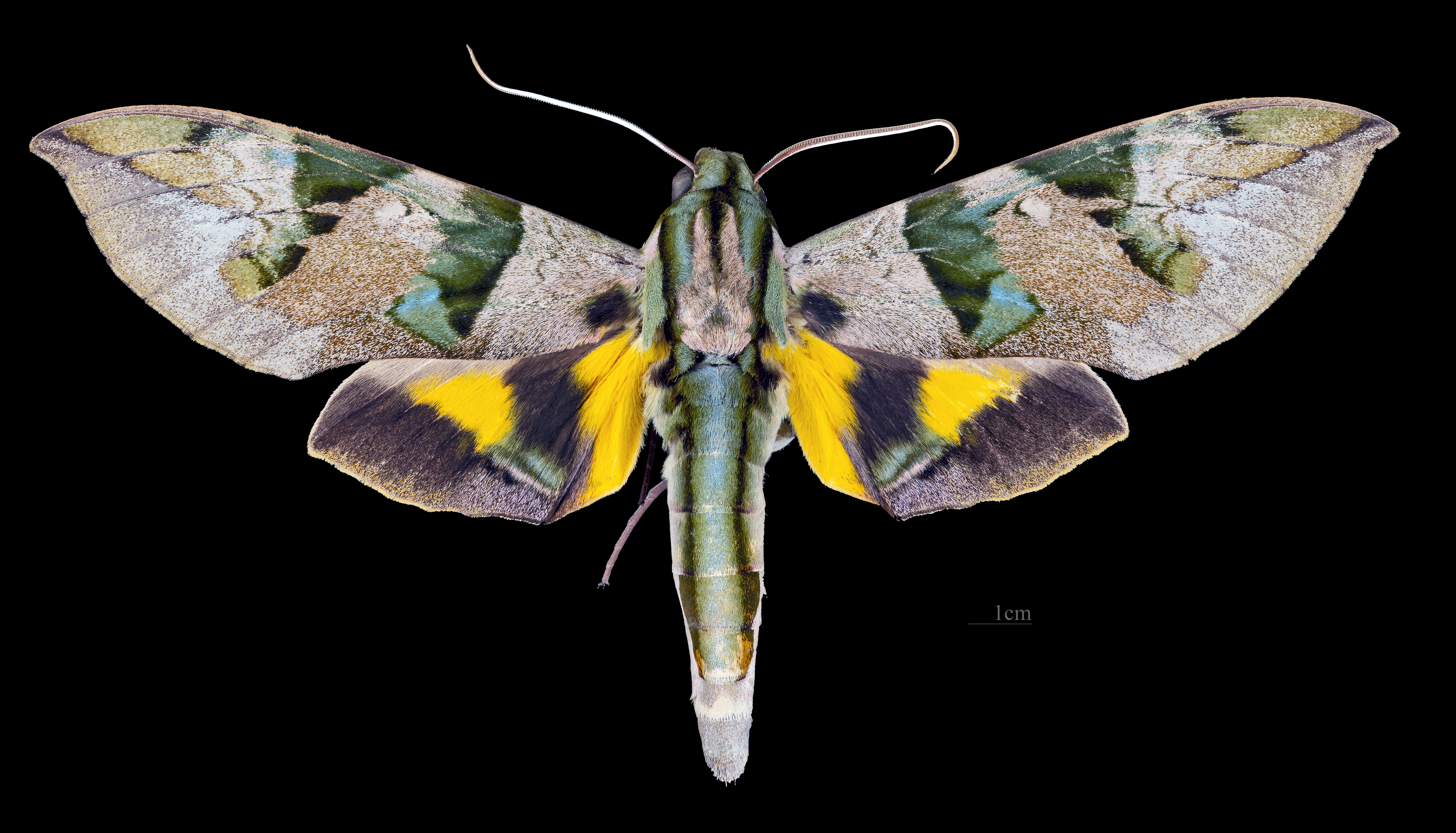
Male dorsal view

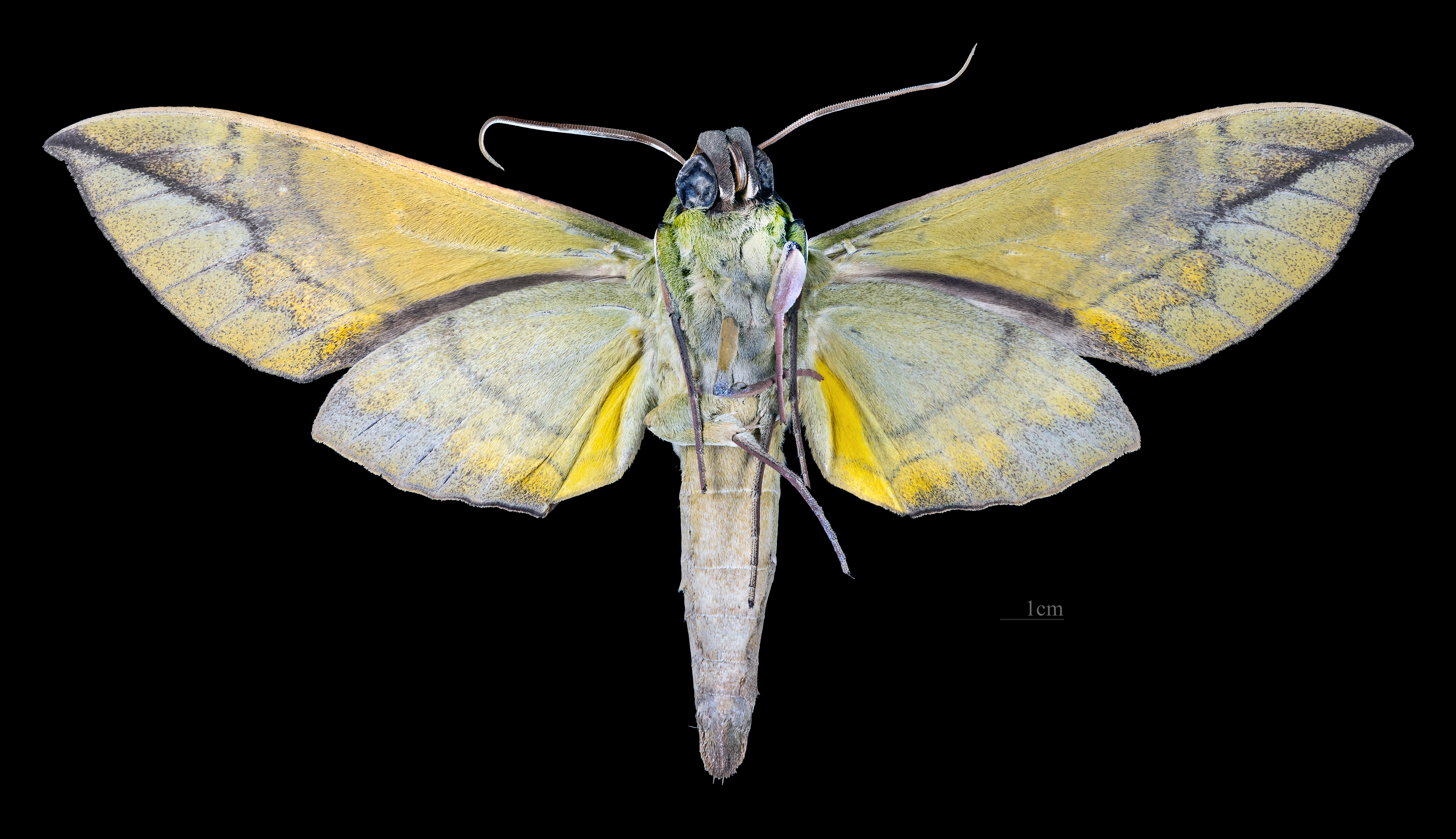
Male ventral view

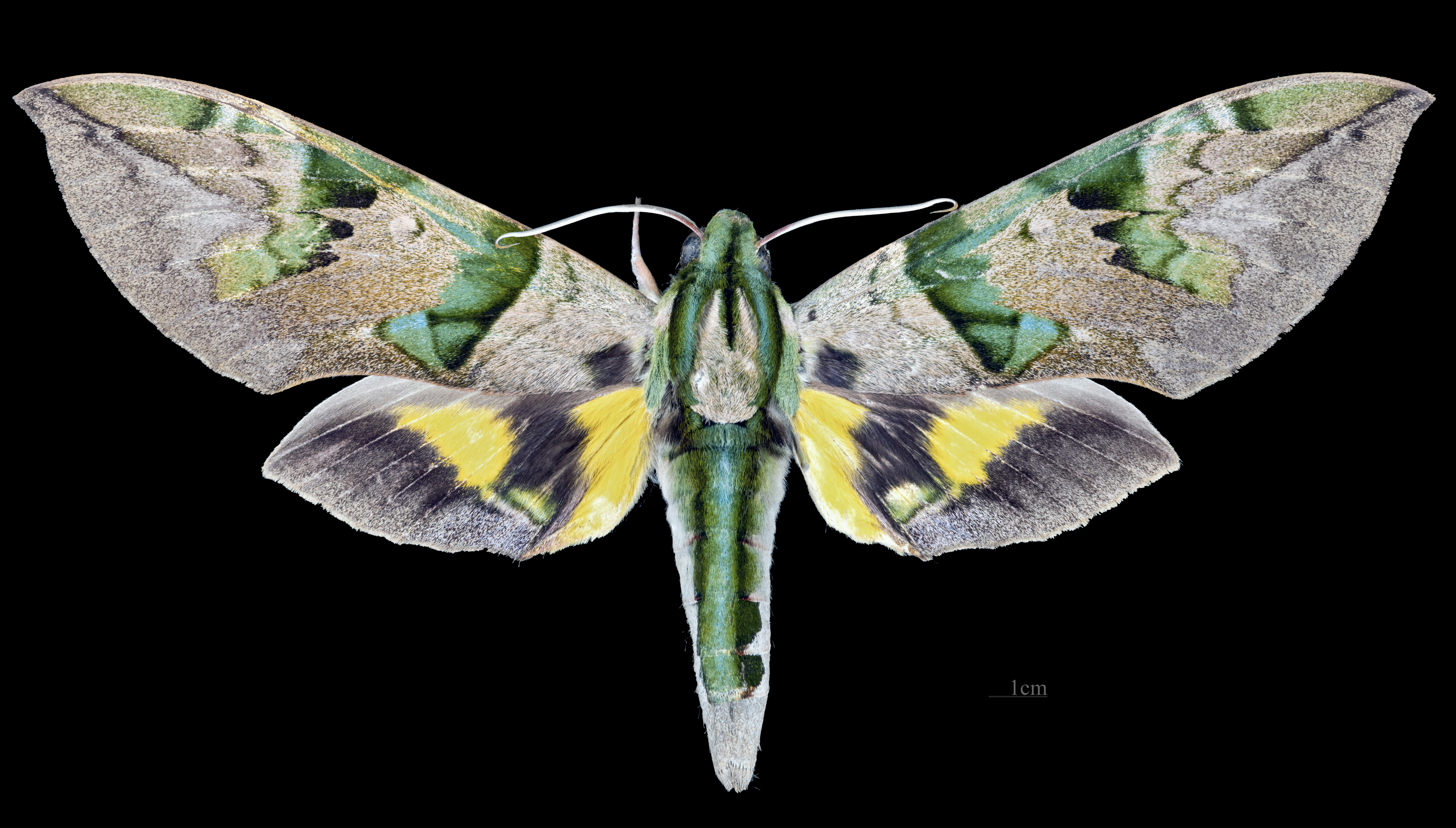
Female dorsal view

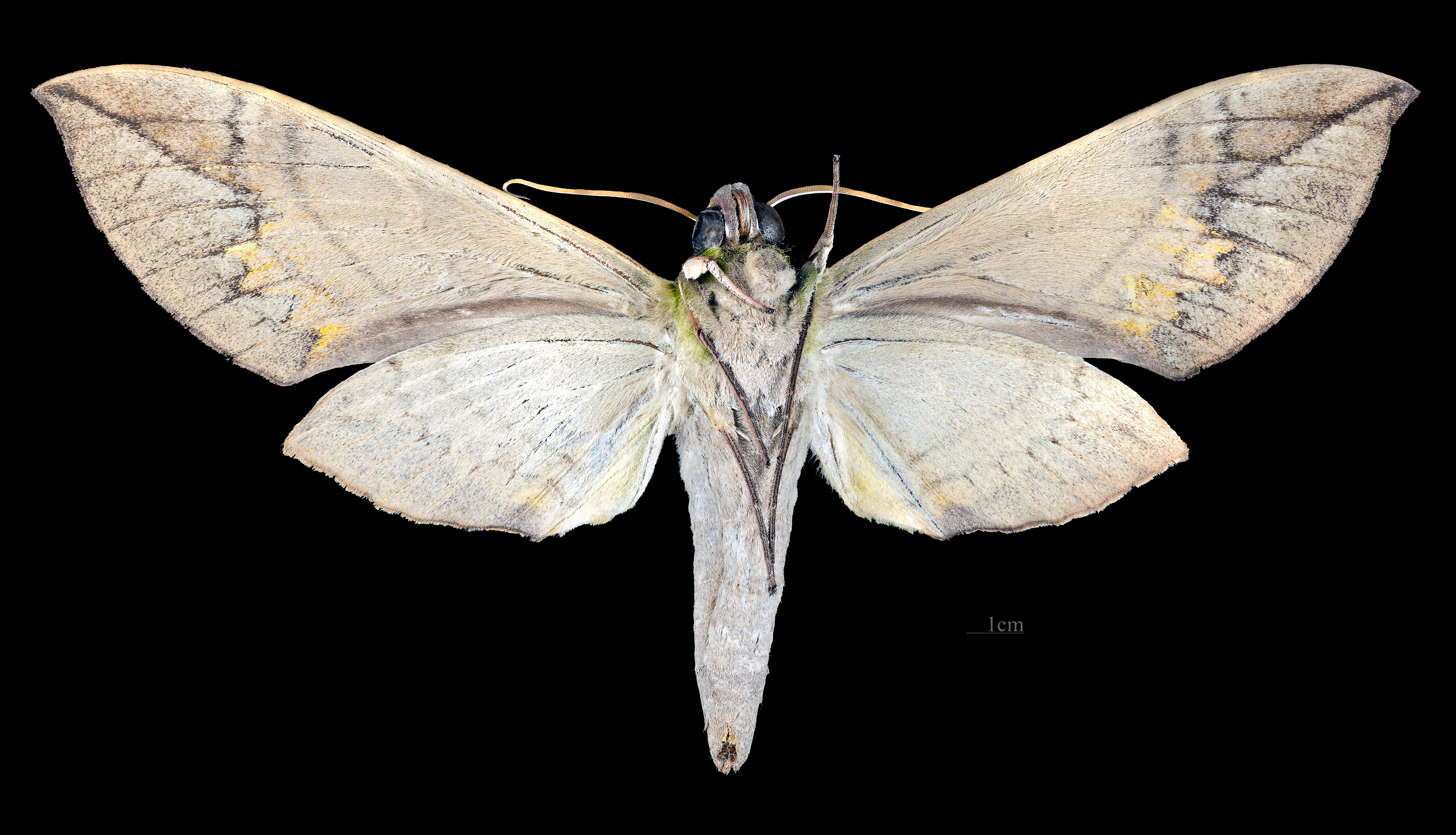
Female ventral view

== Biology ==
Adults are on wing year round. They feed on the nectar of various flowers.

The larvae probably feed on Vitaceae, Apocynaceae or Onagraceae species.
