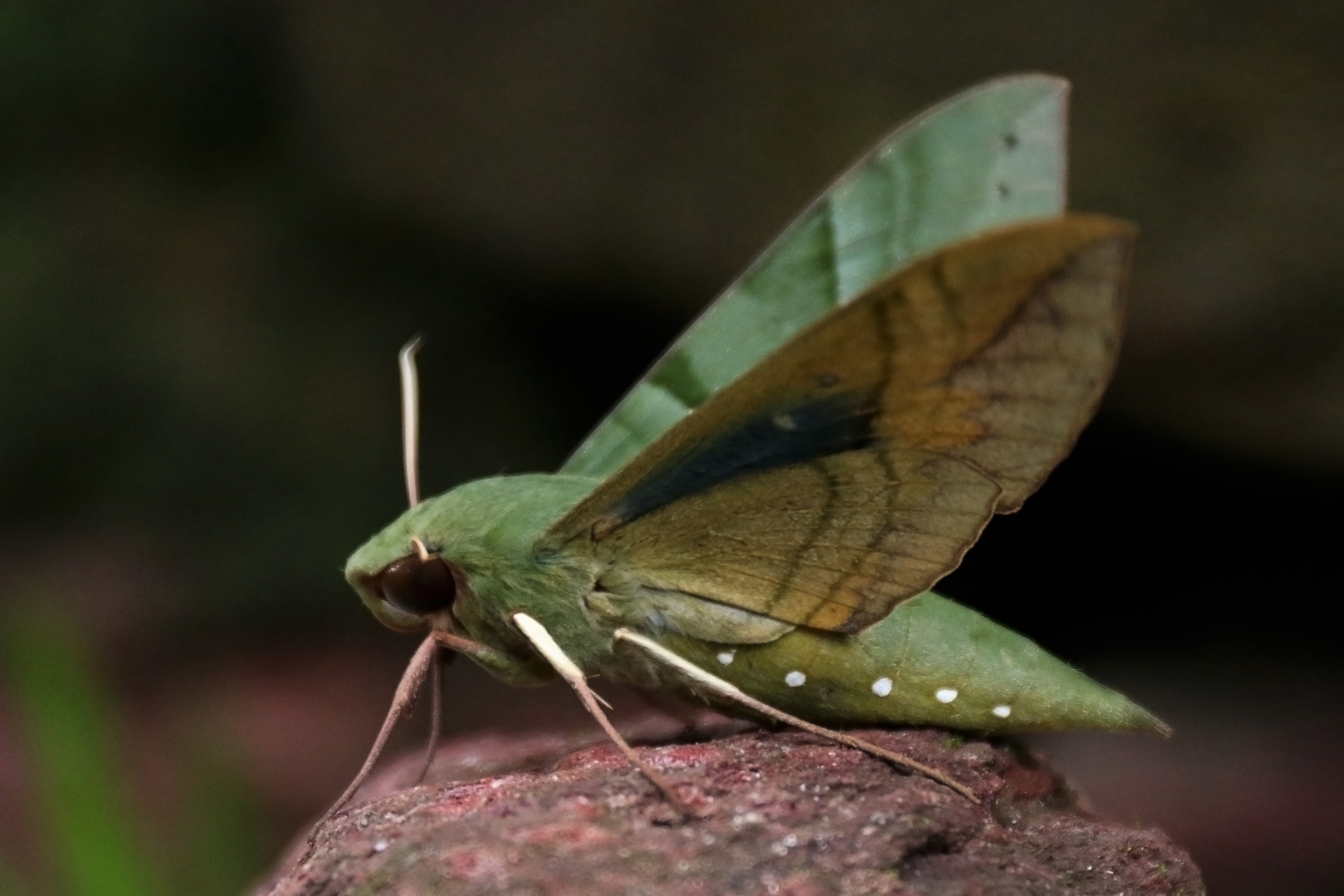
- São Paulo, Brazil

Scientific classification
- Kingdom: Animalia
- Phylum: Arthropoda
- Class: Insecta
- Order: Lepidoptera
- Family: Sphingidae
- Genus: Eumorpha
- Species: E. labruscae

Binomial name
- Eumorpha labruscae (Linnaeus, 1758)

Synonyms
- Sphinx labruscae Linnaeus, 1758; Sphinx clotho Fabricius, 1775; Pholus labruscae yupanquii Kernbach, 1962

= Eumorpha labruscae =

Gaudy sphinx

Species of moth

Eumorpha labruscae, the gaudy sphinx, is a moth in the family Sphingidae.

== Description ==
Wingspan of 4 5/16–4 3/4 inches (11–12 cm). Its body and dorsal forewings are a deep green color. The dorsal hindwings have purple-blue patches, yellow borders, and a red spot near the inner margin. The underside is yellow green and gray purple. Like most moths in the family Sphingidae, caterpillars pupate in burrows. This species was first described by Carl Linnaeus in his 1758 10th edition of Systema Naturae.

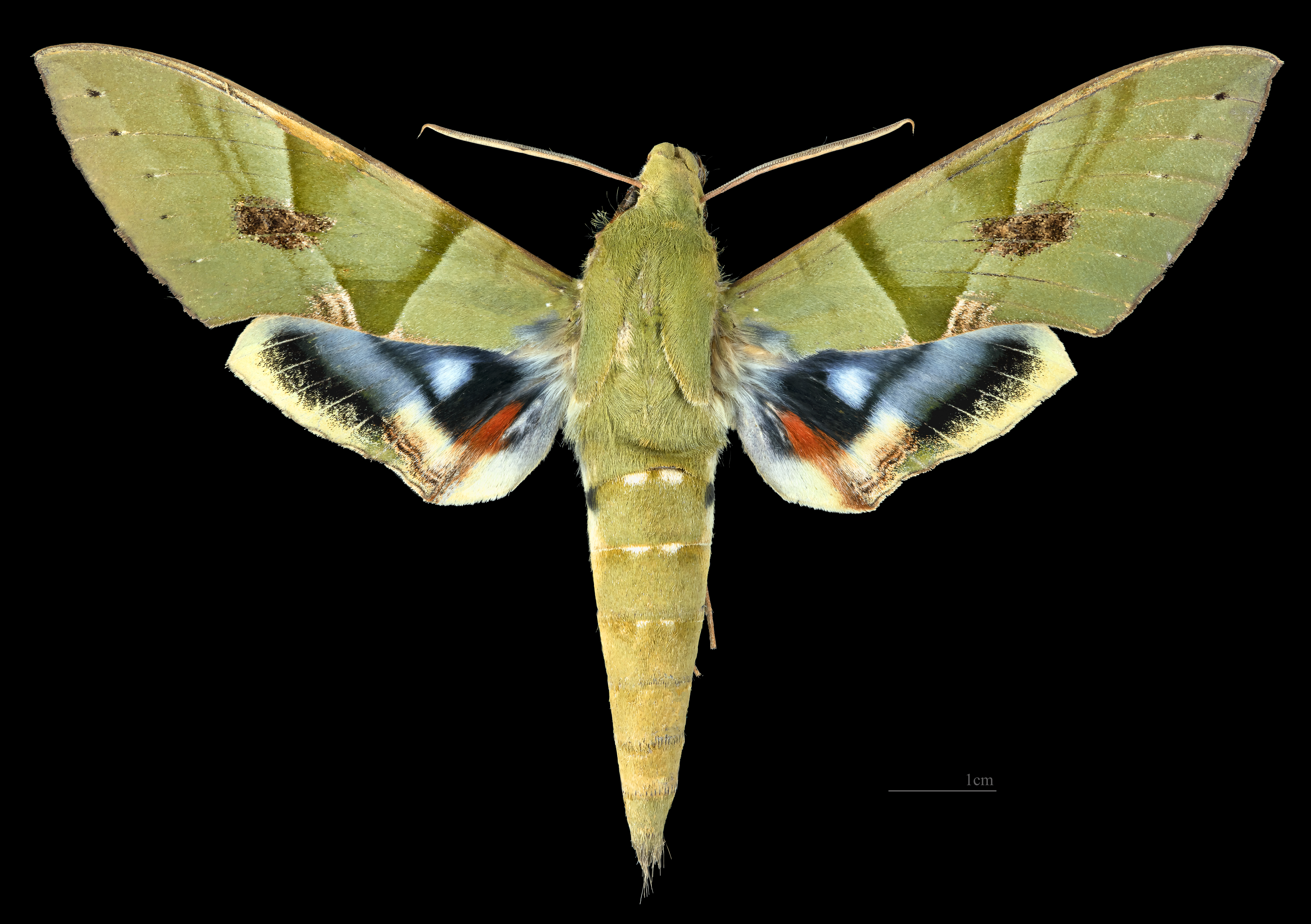
Male dorsal

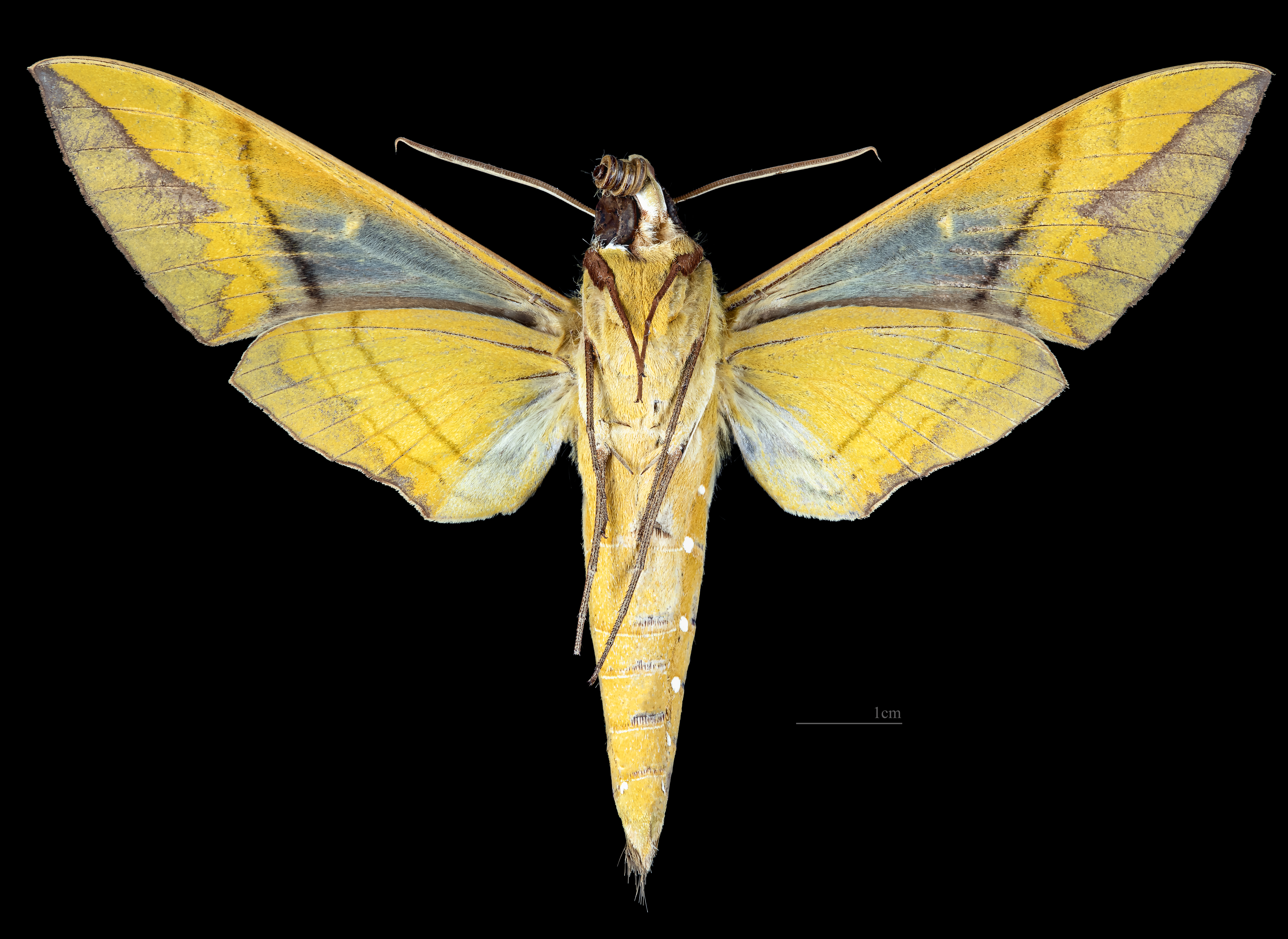
Male ventral

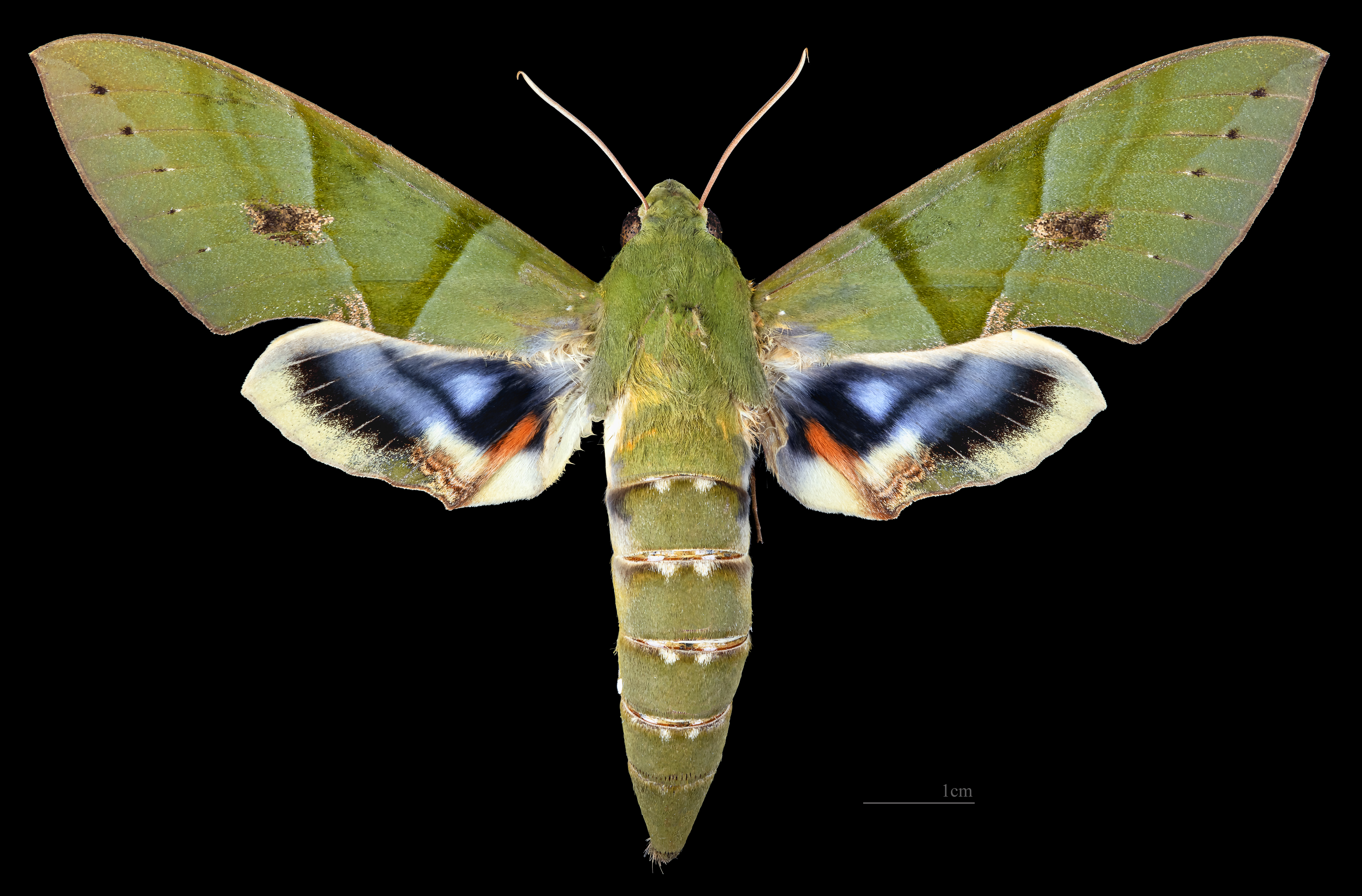
Female dorsal

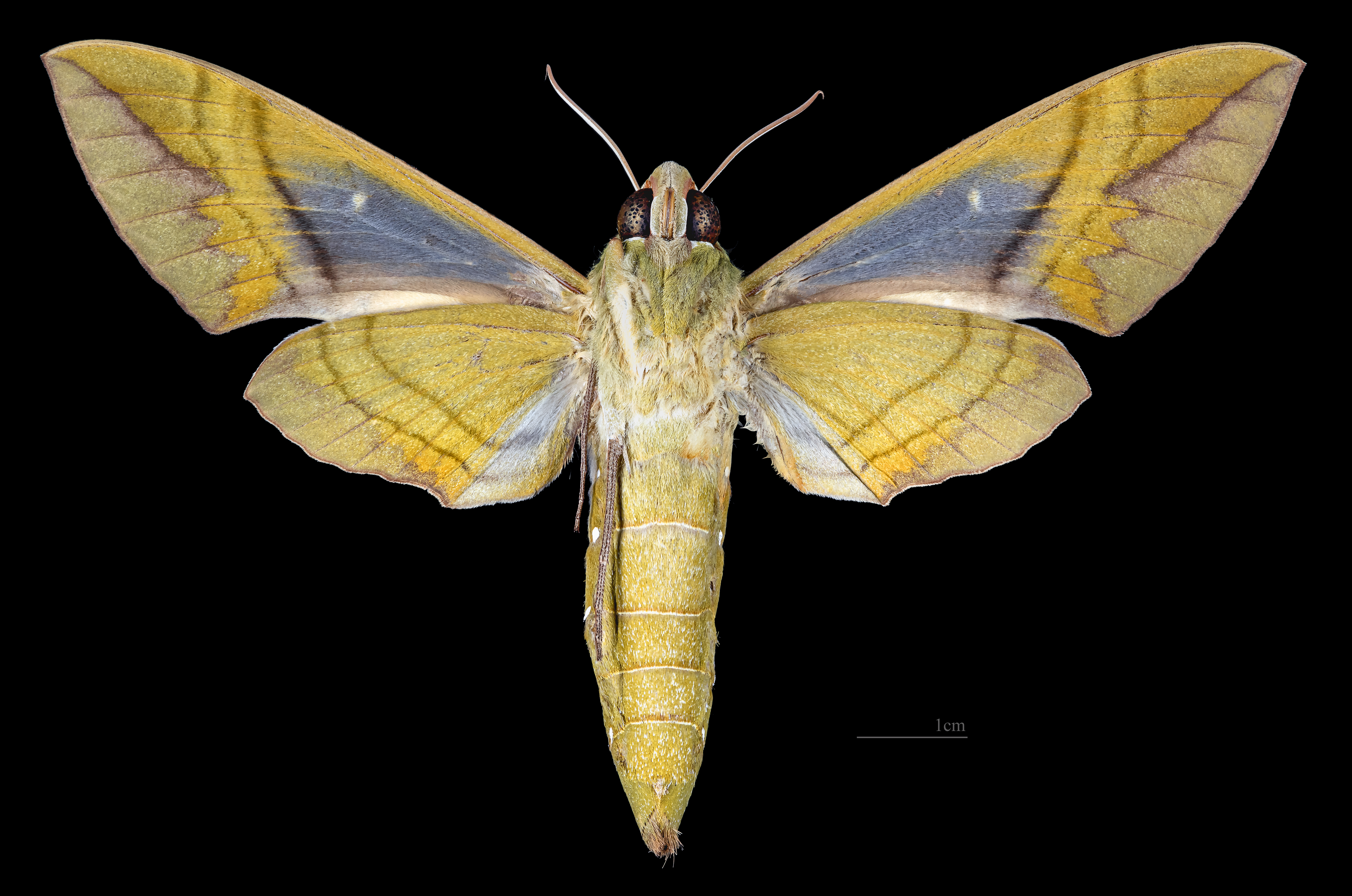
Female ventral

== Life cycle ==
Female adults lay their eggs on the leaves of the host plant, mainly grapes (Vitis), and vine (Cissus). Caterpillars hatch and start eating, resembling the head of a snake. When they are ready to pupate, they climb down their host plant and burrow underground. When the pupa is ready, it wiggles to the surface just prior to eclosion. The newly emerged adults then climb on a plant or some other surface, and pump fluid into their wings to extend them. Females emit pheromones at night, and males fly into the wind to pick up and track the pheromone odor plume. Adults probably feed on flower nectar.

== Subspecies ==
- Eumorpha labruscae labruscae
- Eumorpha labruscae yupanquii (Kernbach, 1962) (Galápagos Islands)
