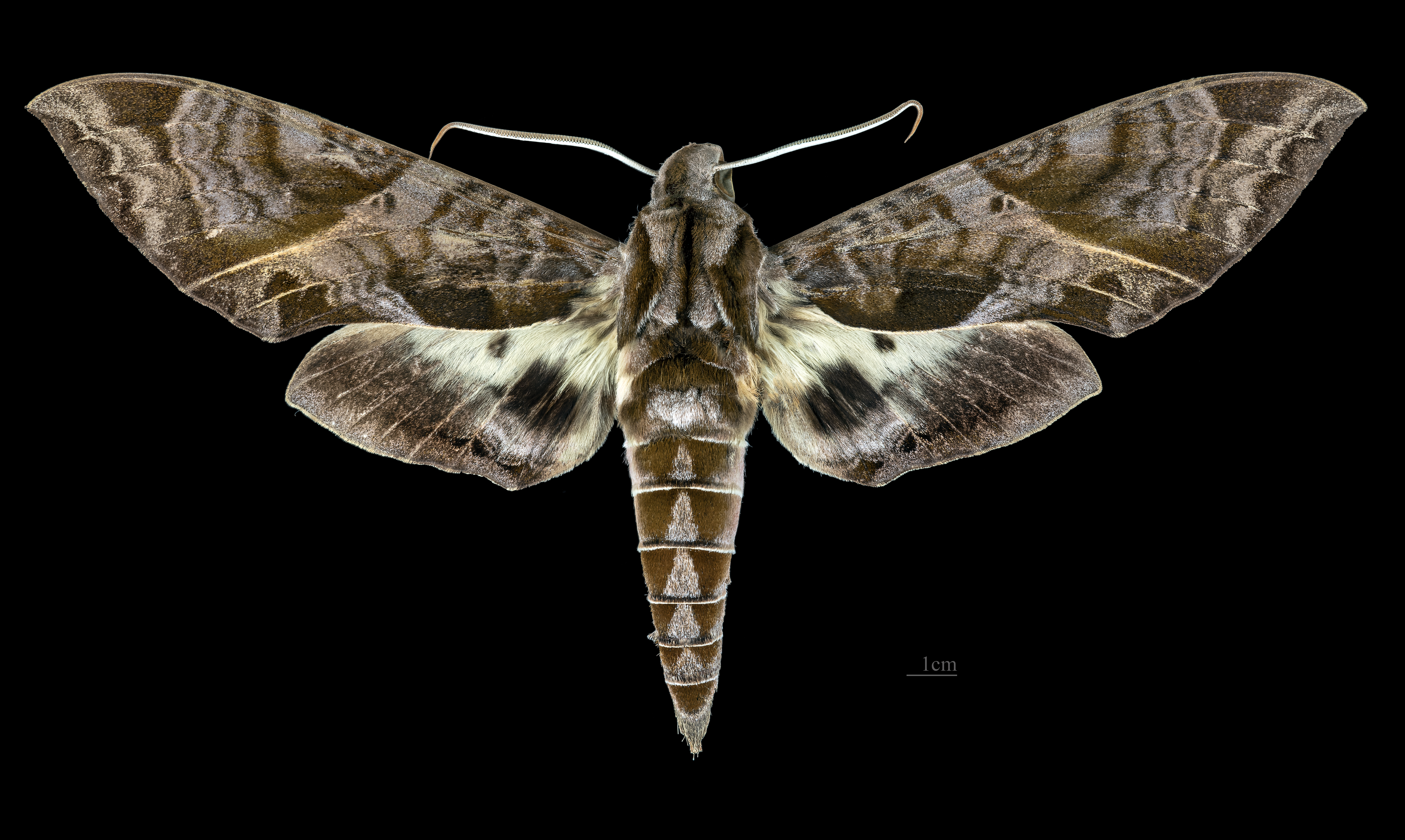
- Male dorsal
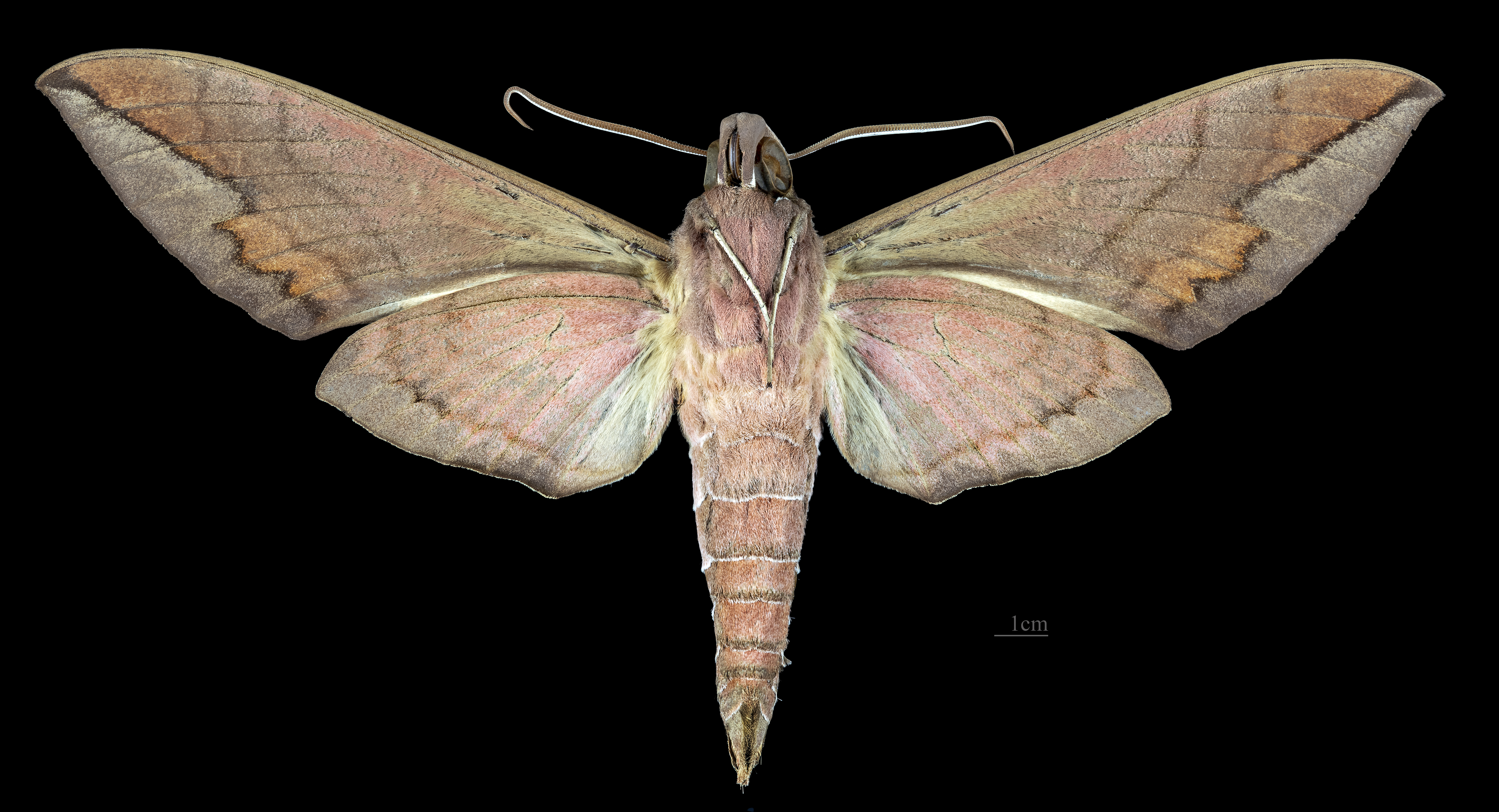
- Male ventral

Scientific classification
- Domain: Eukaryota
- Kingdom: Animalia
- Phylum: Arthropoda
- Class: Insecta
- Order: Lepidoptera
- Family: Sphingidae
- Genus: Eumorpha
- Species: E. triangulum

Binomial name
- Eumorpha triangulum (Rothschild & Jordan, 1903)

Synonyms
- Pholus triangulum Rothschild & Jordan, 1903

= Eumorpha triangulum =

Species of moth

Eumorpha triangulum is a moth of the family Sphingidae.

== Distribution ==
It is found throughout Latin America; namely Mexico, Belize, Guatemala, Honduras, Nicaragua, Costa Rica, Panama, Colombia, Ecuador, Peru, Bolivia, Argentina and possibly south-eastern Paraguay.

== Description ==
The wingspan is 99–119 mm for males and 103–130 mm for females. It is similar to Eumorpha anchemolus, but the forewing upperside pattern is more contrasting and variegated. There is a prominent discal spot found on the greenish buff basal area of the hindwing upperside.

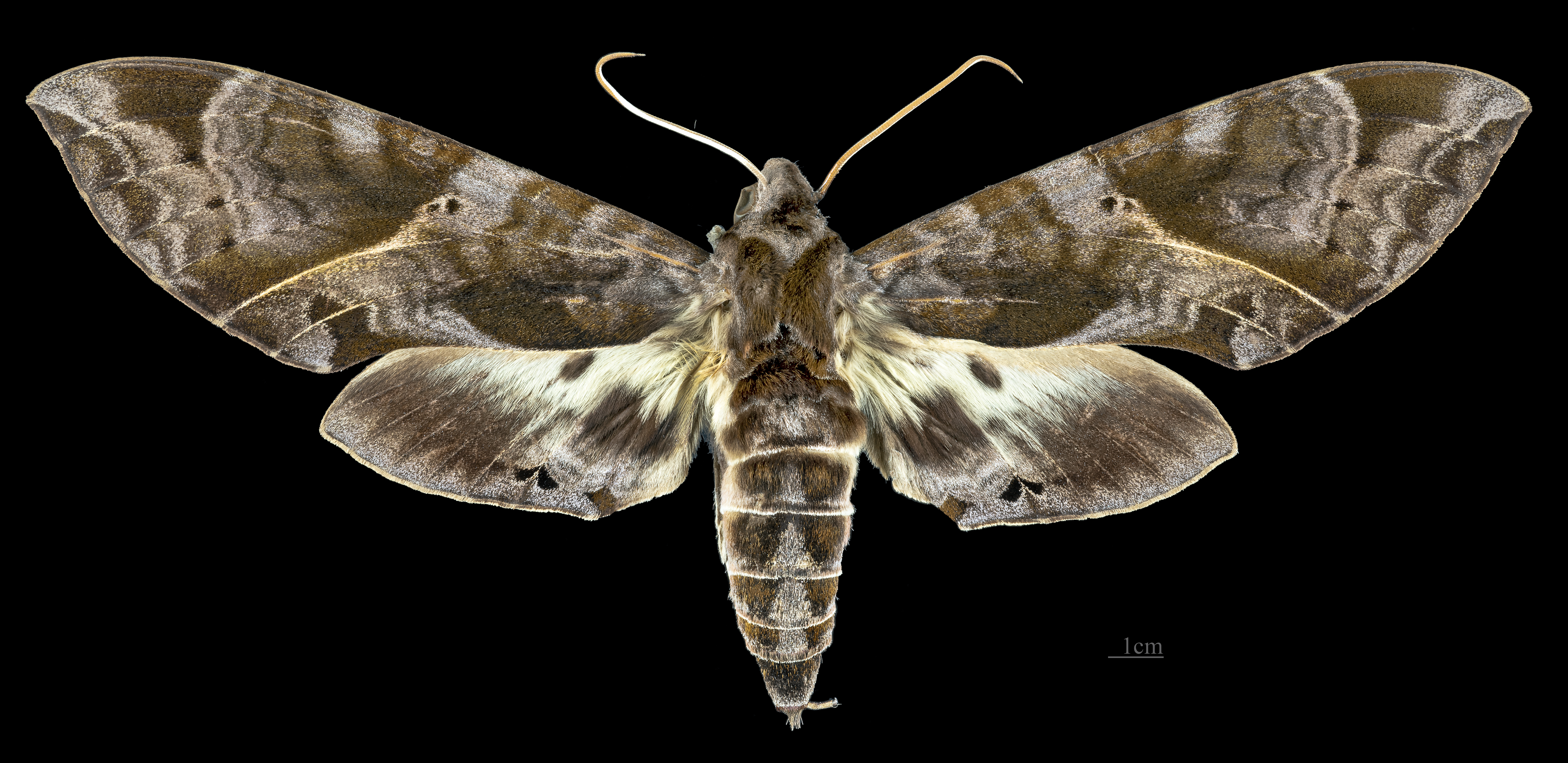
Female dorsal

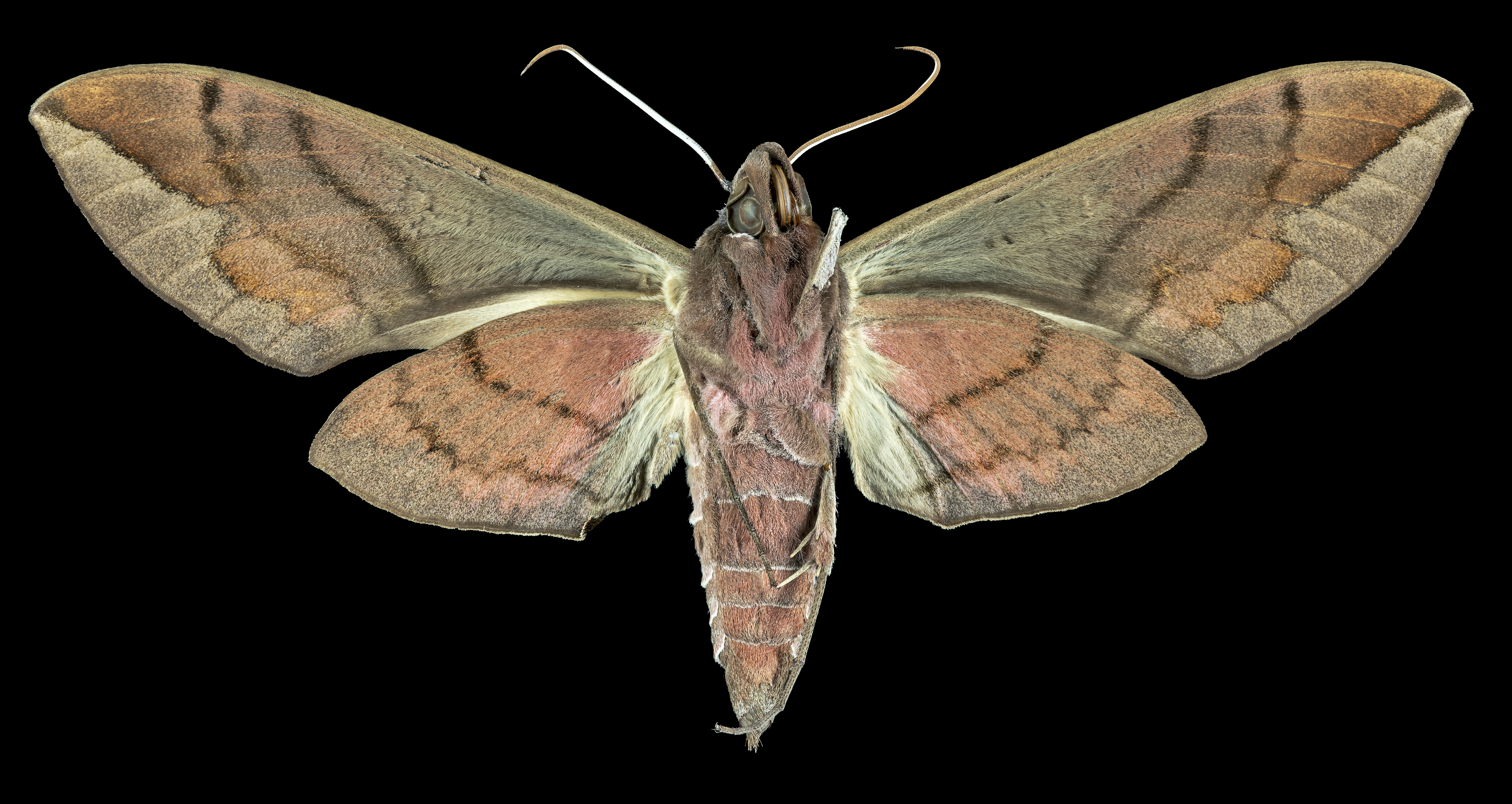
Female ventral

== Biology ==
Adults are on wing year round.

The larvae feed on Saurauia montana and Cissus rhombifolia, as well as Actinidiaceae species. They have a well-developed anal horn in the first instar, becoming less prominent as the larvae develop.
