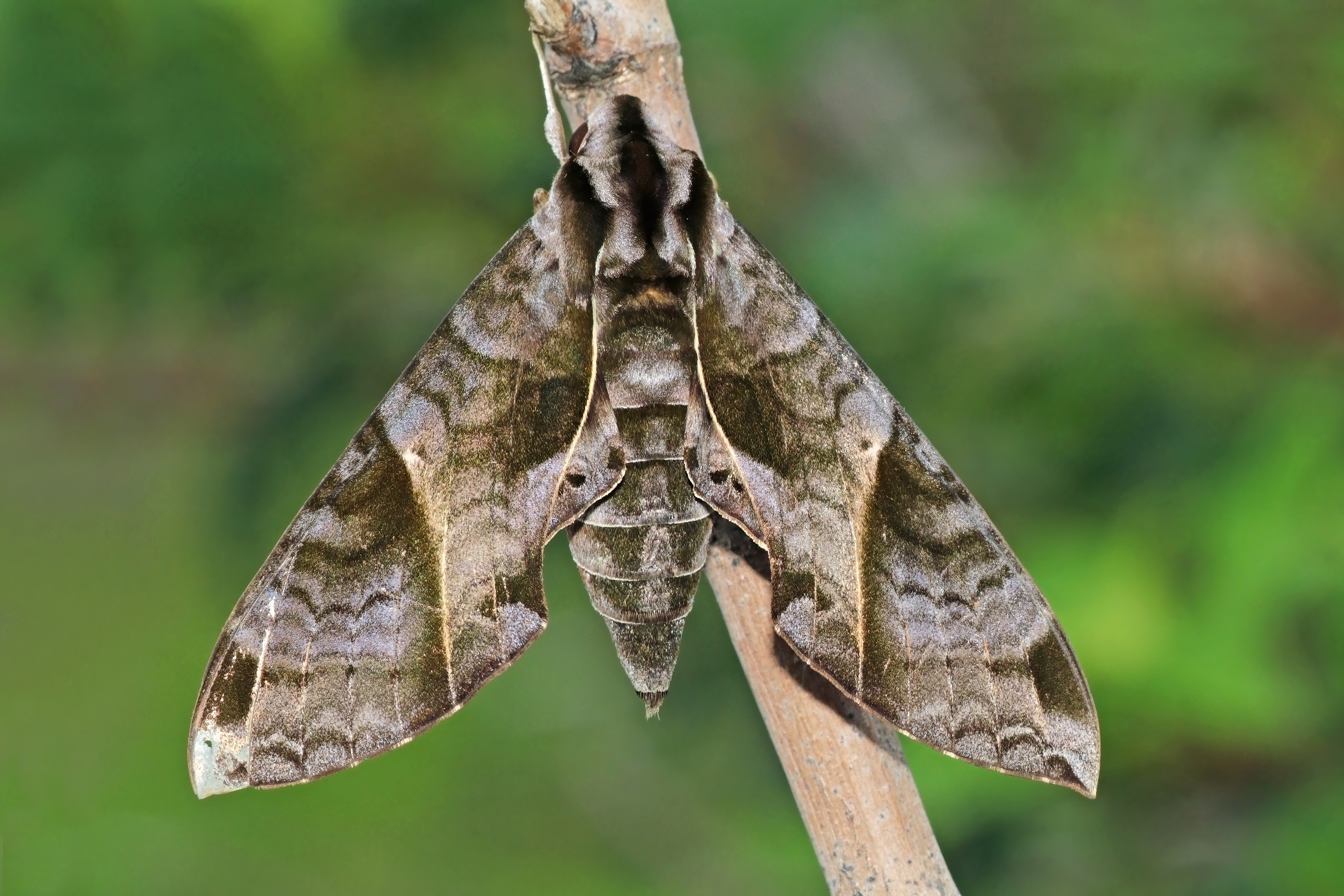
- Mount Totumas cloud forest, Panama

Scientific classification
- Domain: Eukaryota
- Kingdom: Animalia
- Phylum: Arthropoda
- Class: Insecta
- Order: Lepidoptera
- Family: Sphingidae
- Genus: Eumorpha
- Species: E. anchemolus

Binomial name
- Eumorpha anchemolus (Cramer, 1780)

Synonyms
- Sphinx anchemolus Cramer, 1779; Eumorpha anchemola; Eumorpha major; Philampelus anchemolus; Philampelus satellitia major Burmeister, 1878

= Eumorpha anchemolus =

Anchemola sphinx moth

Species of moth

Eumorpha anchemolus, the anchemola sphinx moth, is a moth of the family Sphingidae. The species was first described by Pieter Cramer in 1780.

== Distribution ==
It is found from Argentina through Central America and into the US state of Texas.

== Description ==
The wingspan is 110-135 mm. It is a large species. It is similar to Eumorpha triangulum, but the forewing upperside pattern is less contrasting and variegated. There is a conspicuous white fringe on the forewing upperside, found along the posterior margin from near the base to beyond the median rhombiform patch.

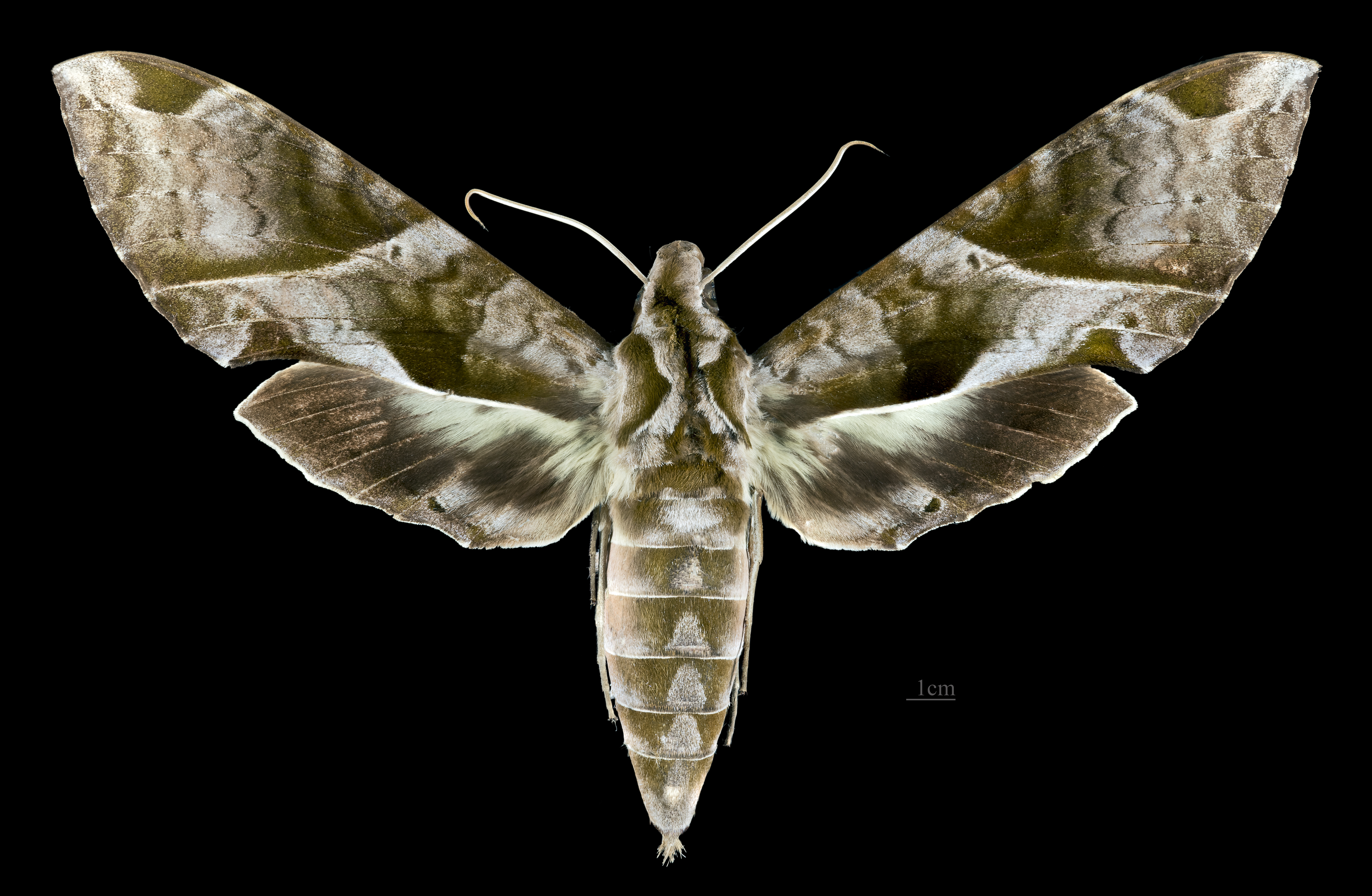
Female, dorsal view

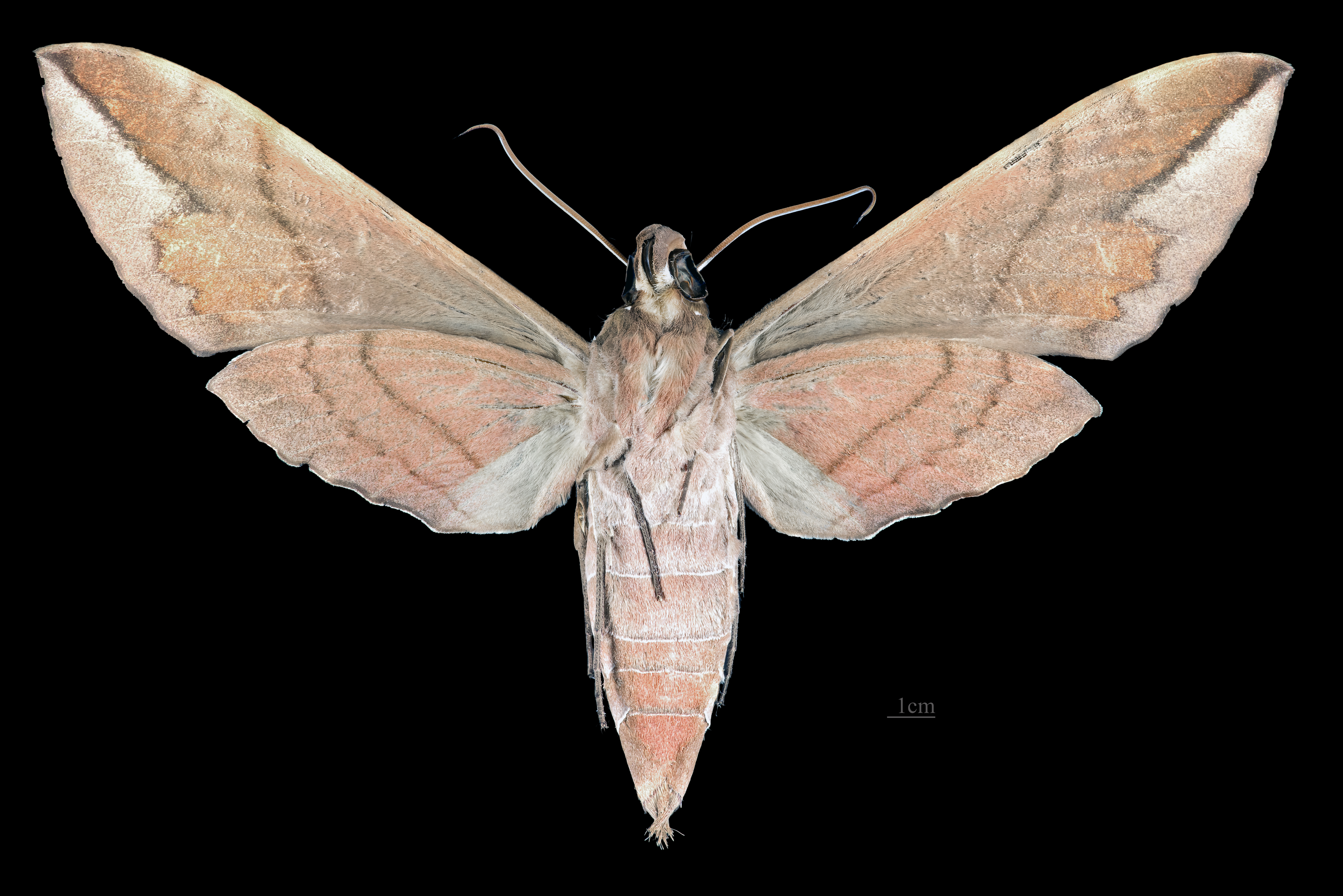
Female, ventral view

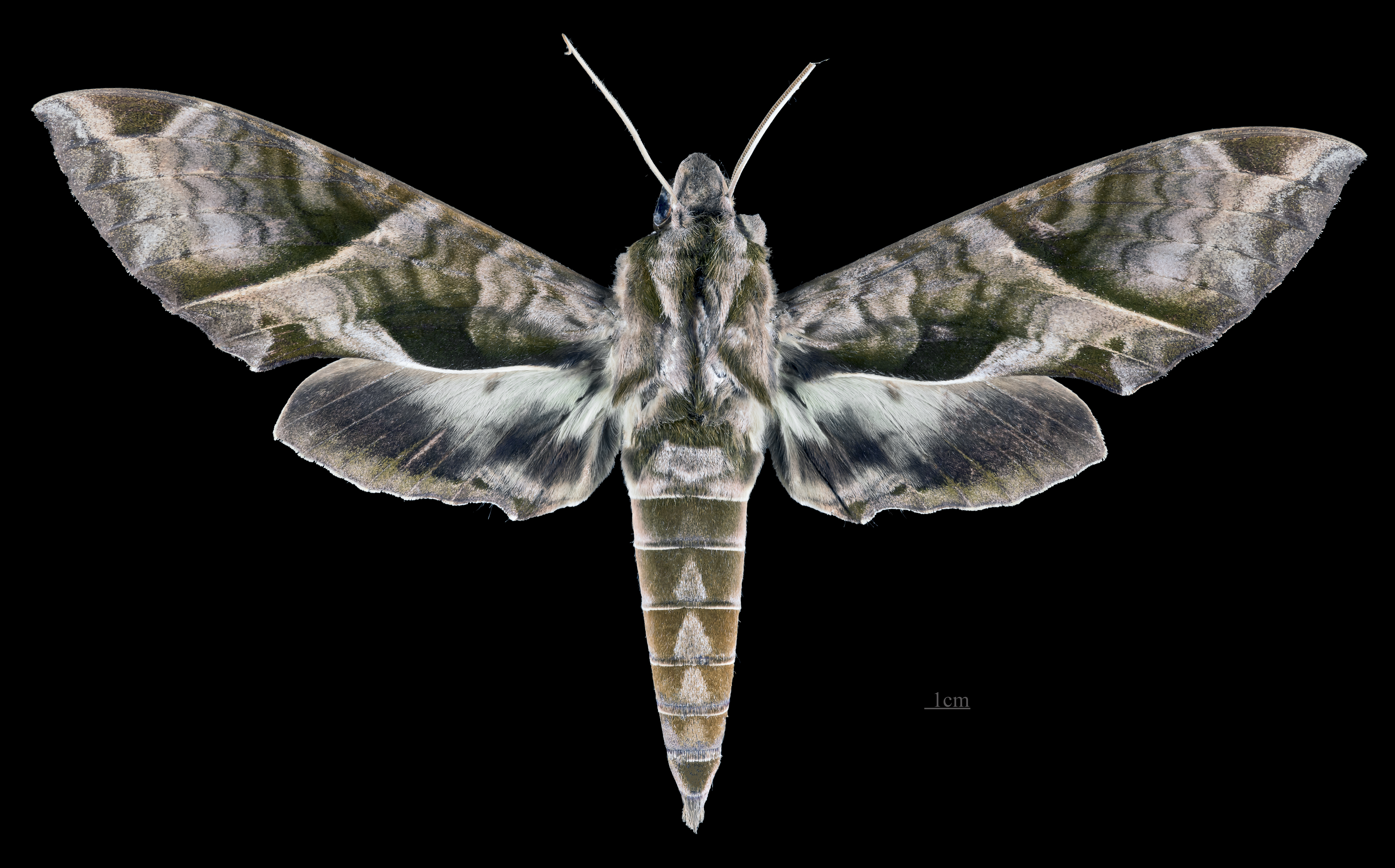
Male, dorsal view

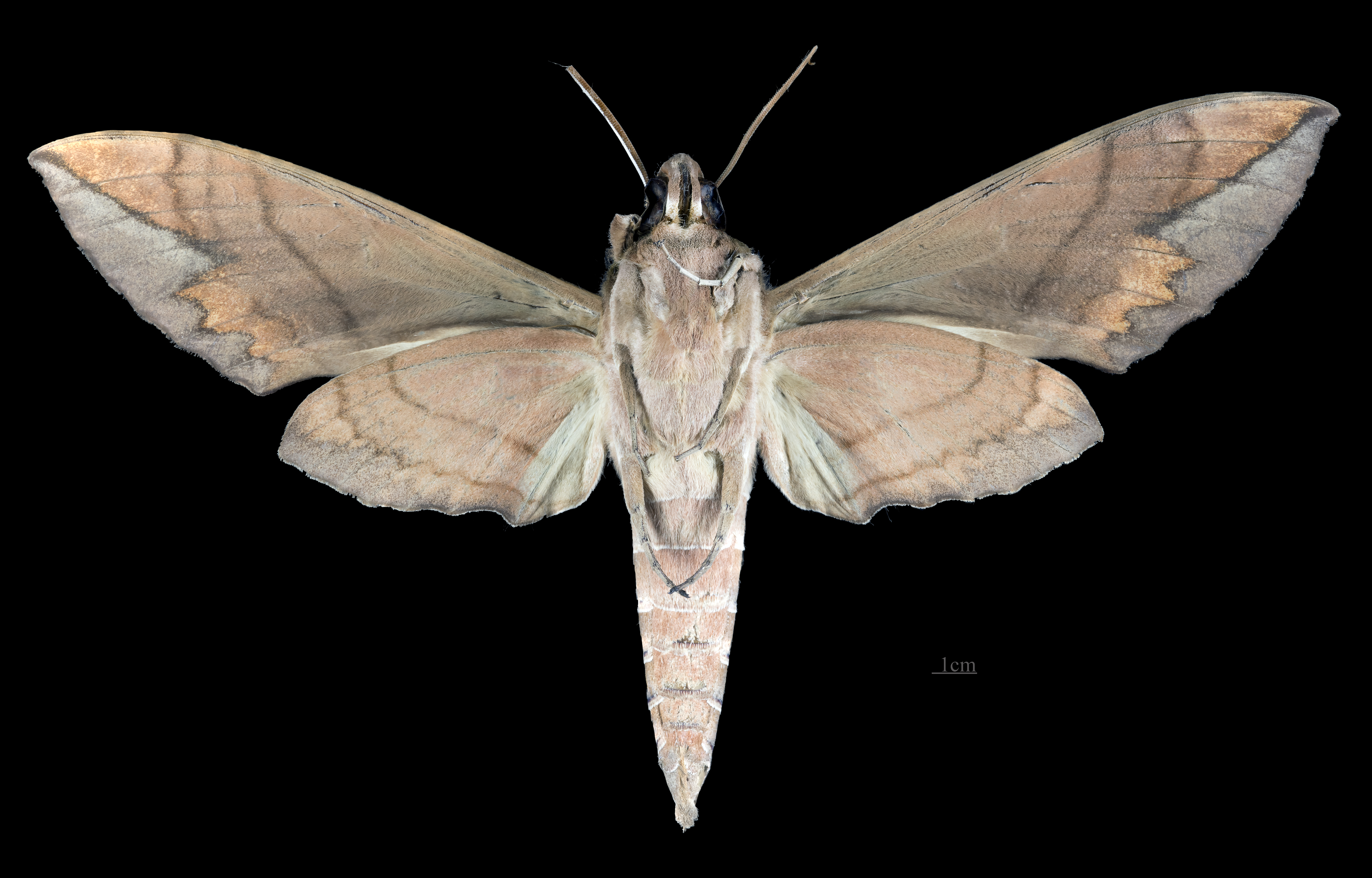
Male, ventral view

== Biology ==
Adults are on wing year round, except the coldest months. They nectar at various flowers.

The larvae feed on Cissus alata, Cissus pseudosicyoides, Cissus erosa, Vitis and Ampelopsis species.
