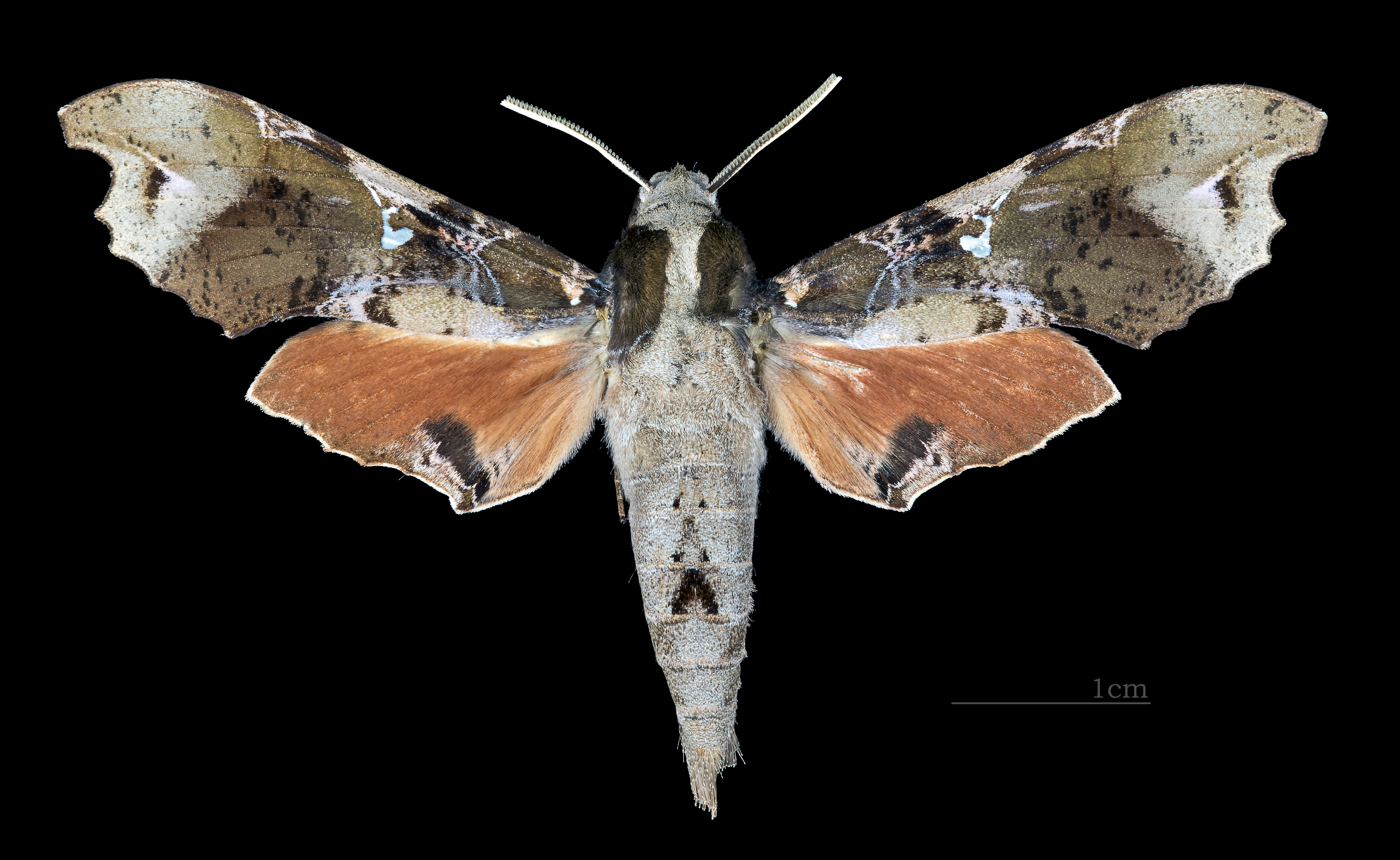
- Male dorsal
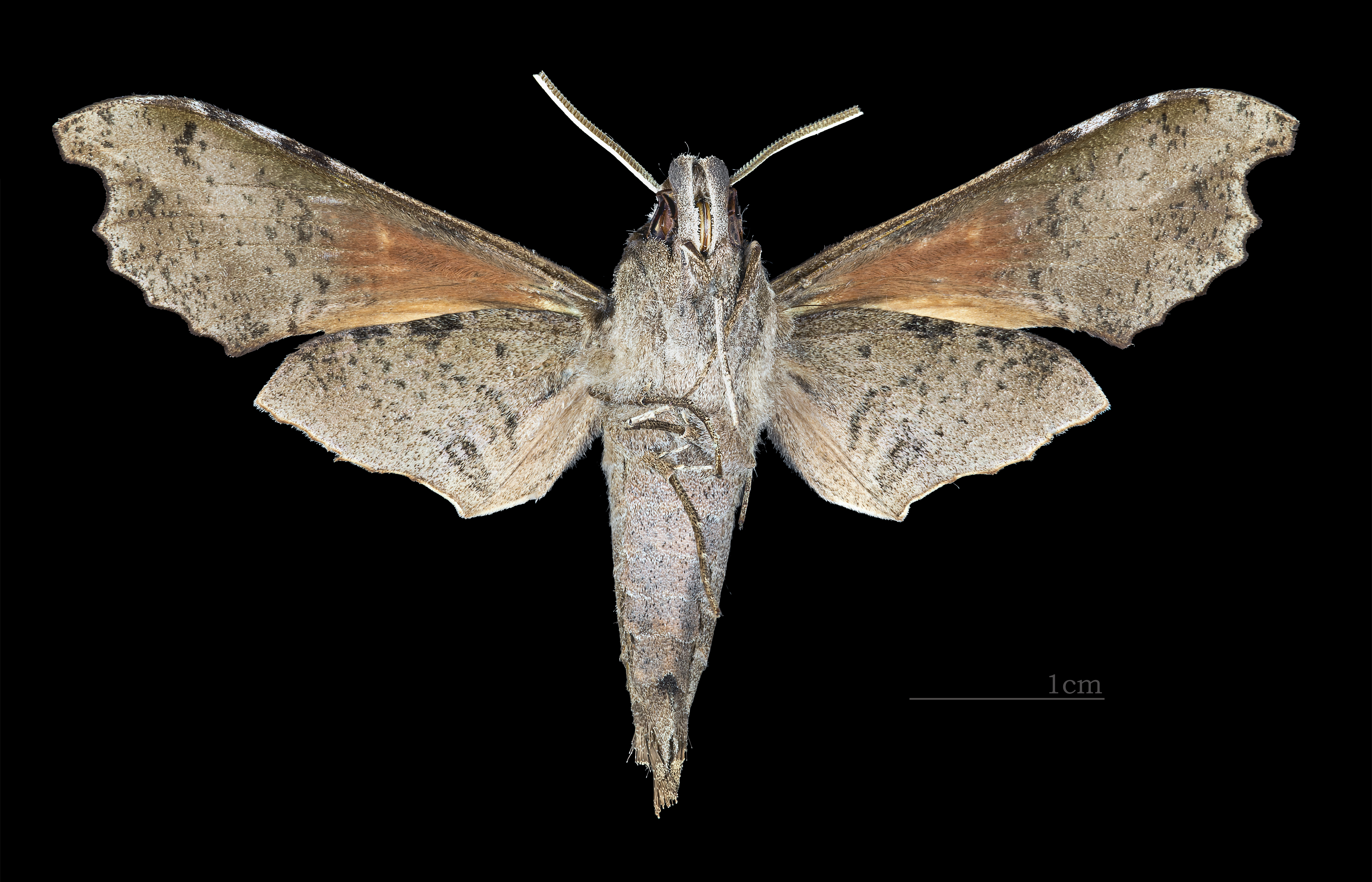
- Male ventral

Scientific classification
- Domain: Eukaryota
- Kingdom: Animalia
- Phylum: Arthropoda
- Class: Insecta
- Order: Lepidoptera
- Family: Sphingidae
- Genus: Callionima
- Species: C. denticulata

Binomial name
- Callionima denticulata (Schaus, 1895)

Synonyms
- Calliomma denticulata Schaus, 1895

= Callionima denticulata =

Species of moth

Callionima denticulata is a species of moth in the family Sphingidae, which is known from Panama, Mexico, Costa Rica, Nicaragua, Bolivia, Peru and western Venezuela. It was originally described by Schaus as Calliomma denticulata, in 1895.

The wingspan is 59–72 mm. Adults are on wing year round in Costa Rica. It is extremely similar to Callionima pan pan, but the forewing apex is strongly truncate, the outer margin strongly excavate below the apex and markedly dentate. The basal half of the forewing underside is distinctly orange, contrasting with the greyish-brown distal part. The hindwing upperside is as in Callionima pan pan, but the black anal spot is at least 1.5 mm wide.

The larvae feed on Tabernaemontana alba and probably other Apocynaceae species. They are green with reddish orange spiracles and a longitudinal, dotted black line down the back and an orange, thick anal horn.
