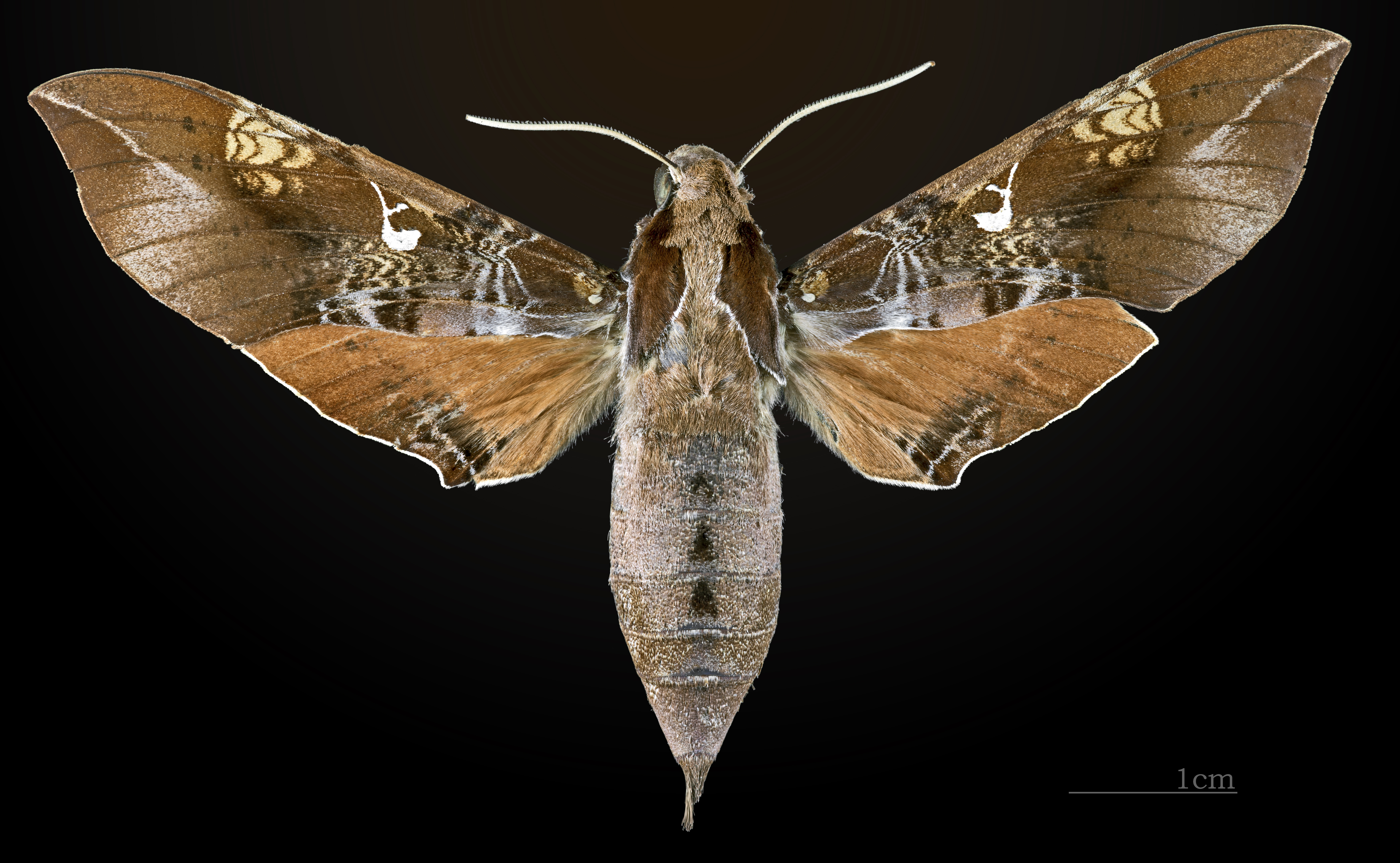

Scientific classification
- Domain: Eukaryota
- Kingdom: Animalia
- Phylum: Arthropoda
- Class: Insecta
- Order: Lepidoptera
- Family: Sphingidae
- Genus: Callionima
- Species: C. inuus

Binomial name
- Callionima inuus Rothschild & Jordan, 1903

Synonyms
- Hemeroplanes brethesi Köhler, 1924

= Callionima inuus =

Species of moth

Callionima inuus is a species of moth in the family Sphingidae. It was described by Walter Rothschild and Karl Jordan in 1903.

== Distribution ==
It is known from Mexico, Belize, Guatemala, Nicaragua, Costa Rica and Panama through Venezuela to Paraguay, Bolivia, Brazil, Argentina and Peru.

== Description ==
The wingspan is 67–72 mm. Adults are on wing year round.

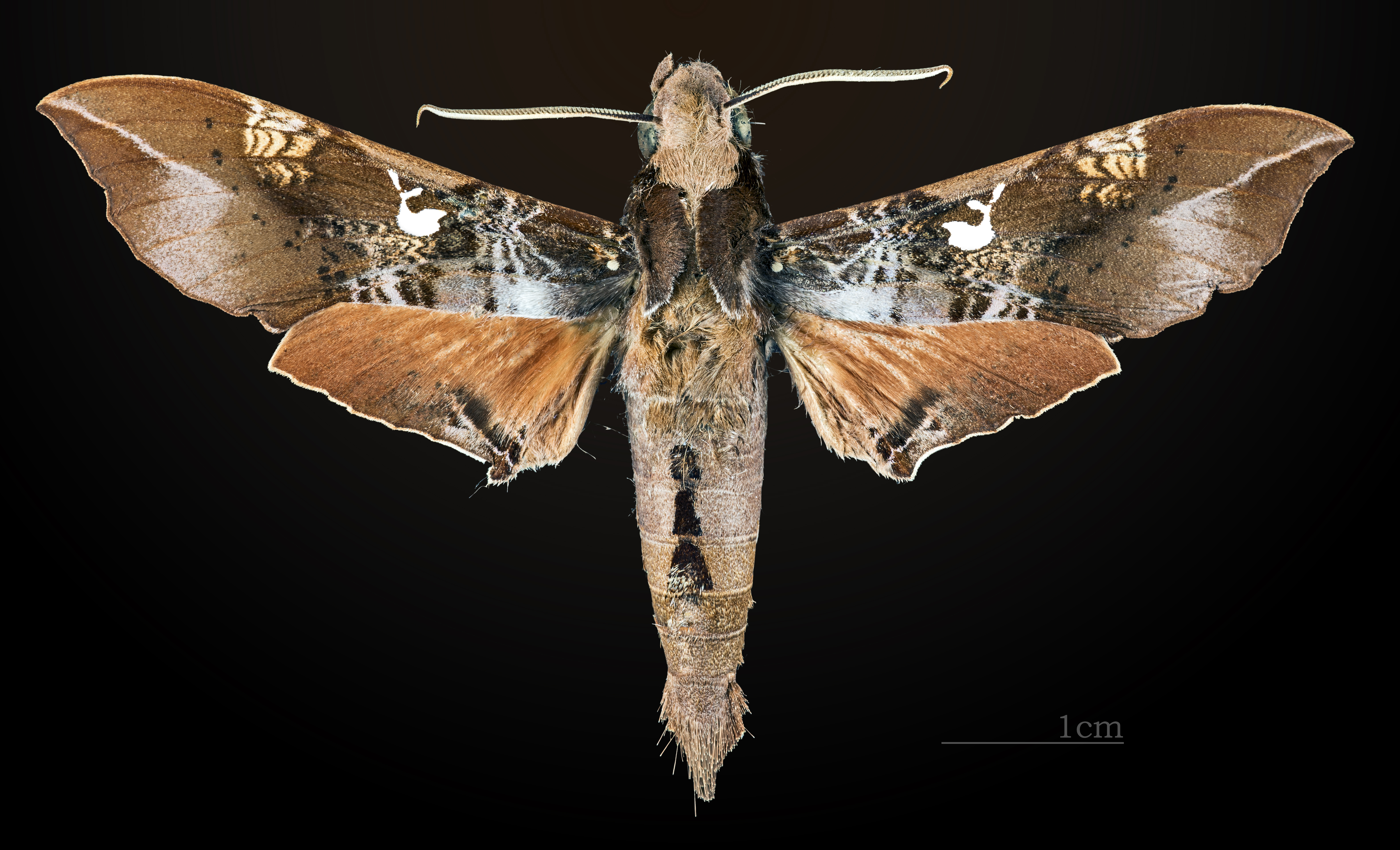
Male

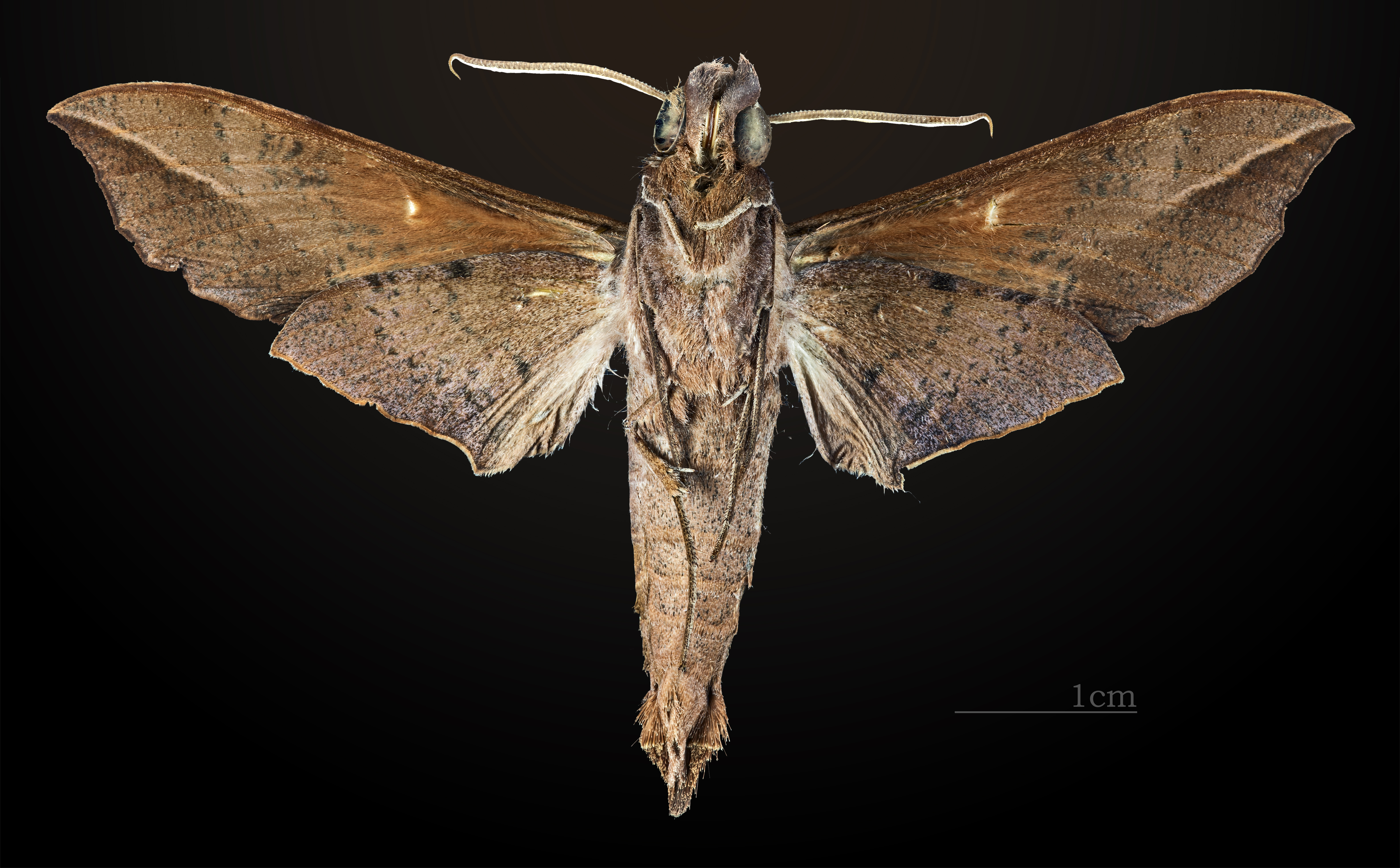
Male underside

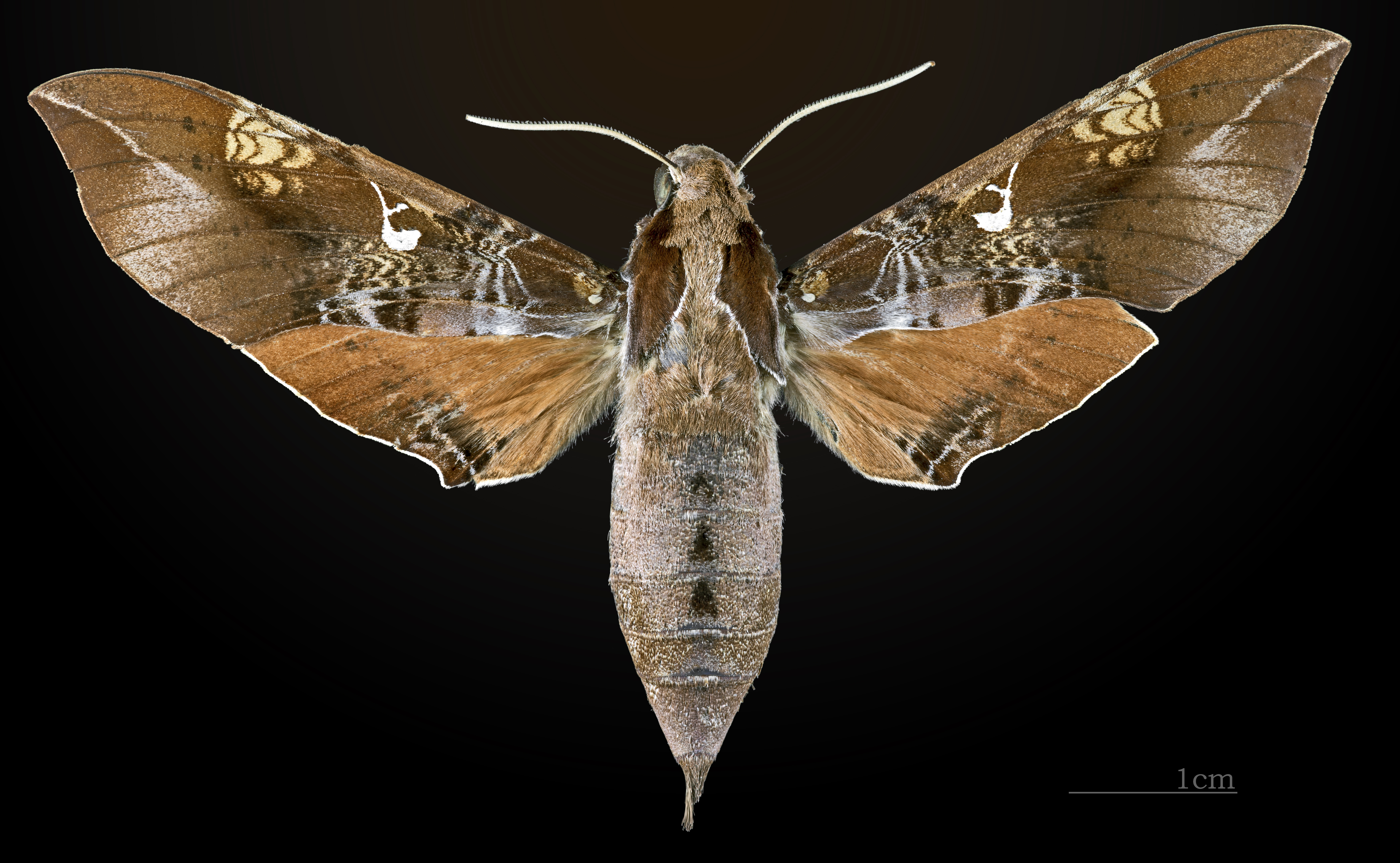
Female

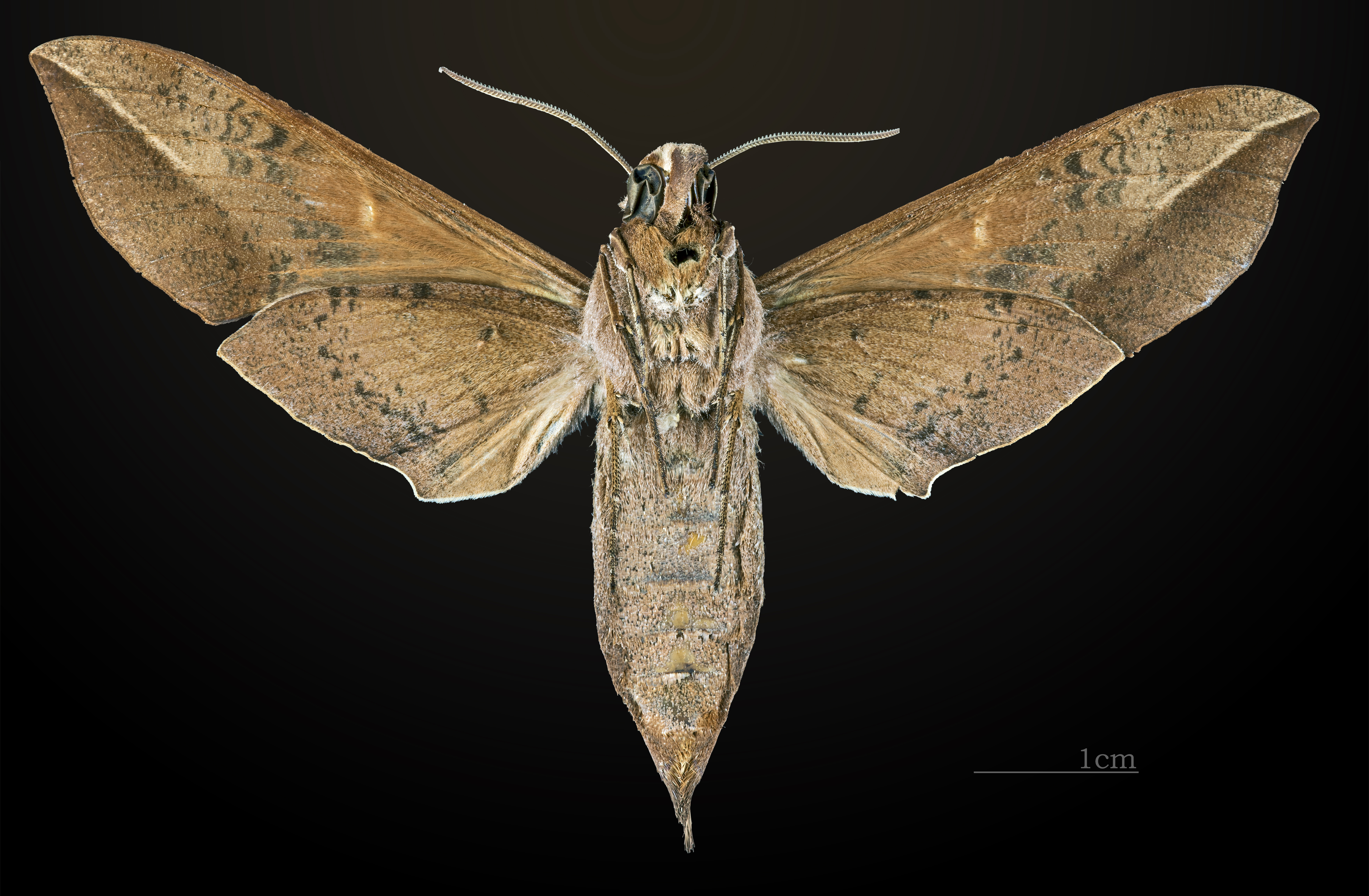
Female underside

== Biology ==
The larvae probably feed on Tabernaemontana alba and other Apocynaceae species.
