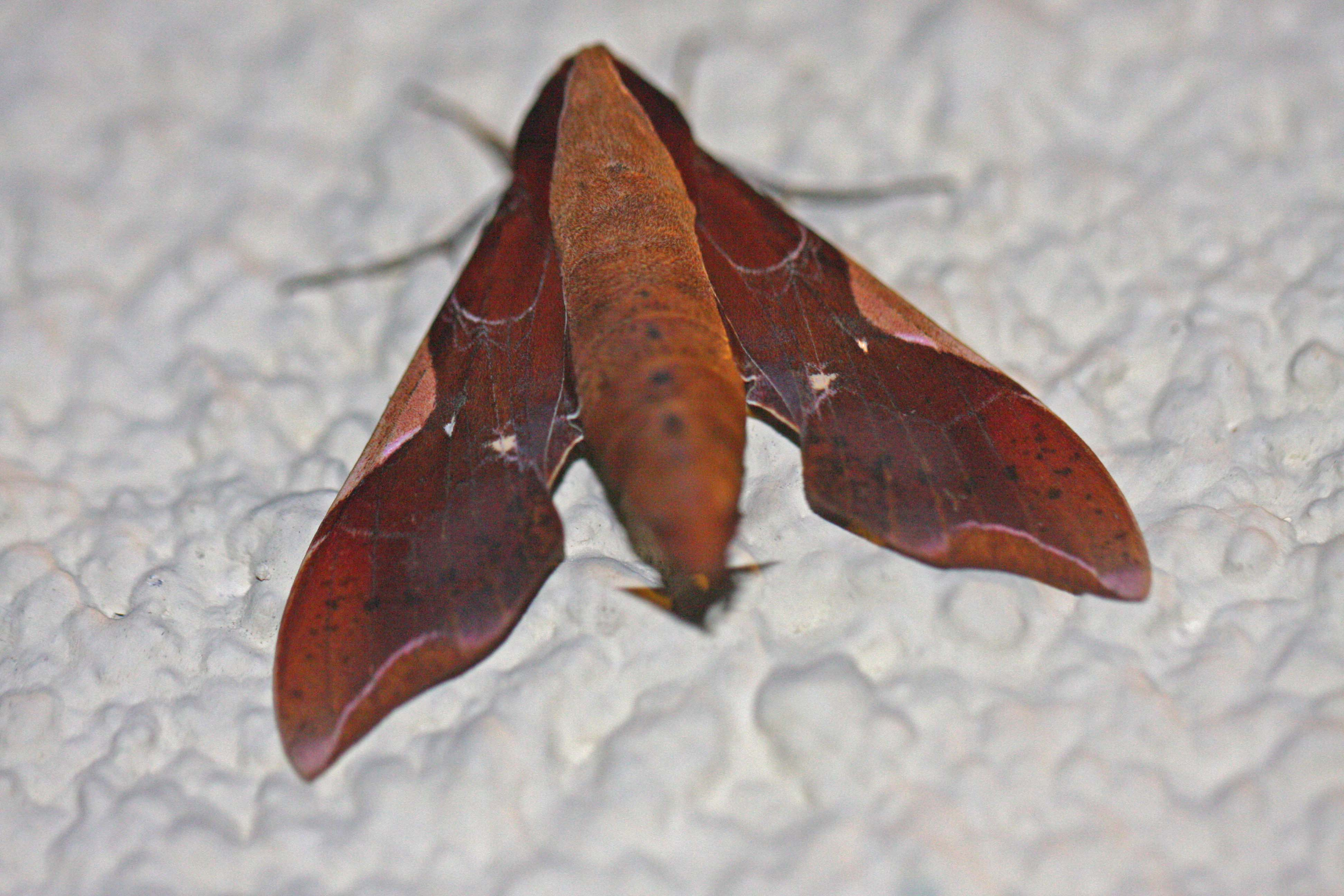

Scientific classification
- Domain: Eukaryota
- Kingdom: Animalia
- Phylum: Arthropoda
- Class: Insecta
- Order: Lepidoptera
- Family: Sphingidae
- Genus: Callionima
- Species: C. nomius

Binomial name
- Callionima nomius (Walker, 1856)

Synonyms
- Eucheryx nomius Boisduval, 1875; Calliomma nomius Walker, 1856

= Callionima nomius =

Fan-tailed bark moth

Species of moth

Callionima nomius, the fan-tailed bark moth, is a moth of the family Sphingidae. The species was first described by Francis Walker in 1856.

== Distribution ==
It is found from Mexico and Central America to the north-western half of South America.

== Description ==
The wingspan is 70–80 mm. It is immediately distinguishable from all other Callionima species by the forewing upperside pattern and hindwing upperside colour. The forewing upperside is deep brown with a pale brown triangular patch on the costa and a silver discal spot represented only by a minute dot. The hindwing upperside is dark brown with a buff base.

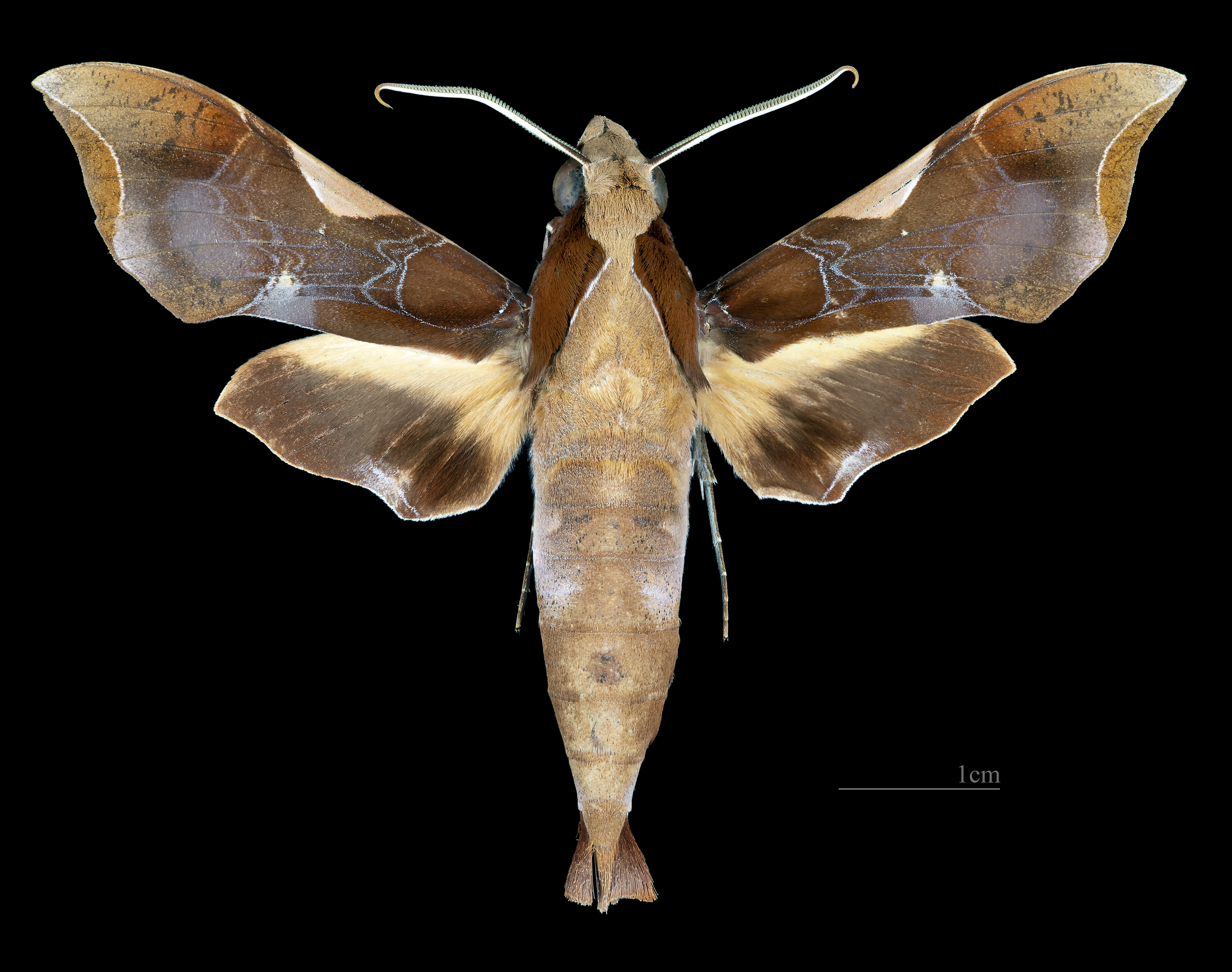
Male dorsal

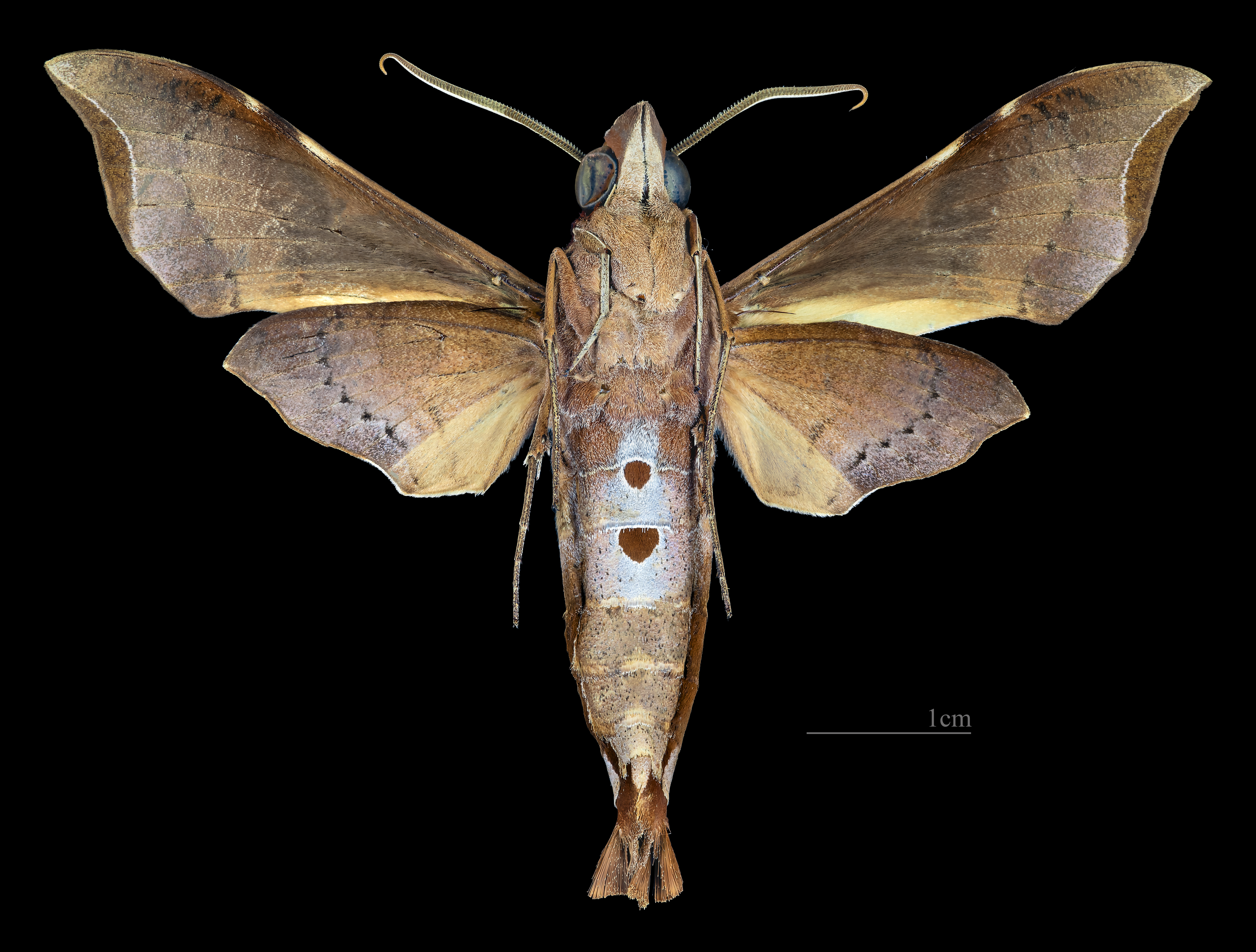
Male ventral

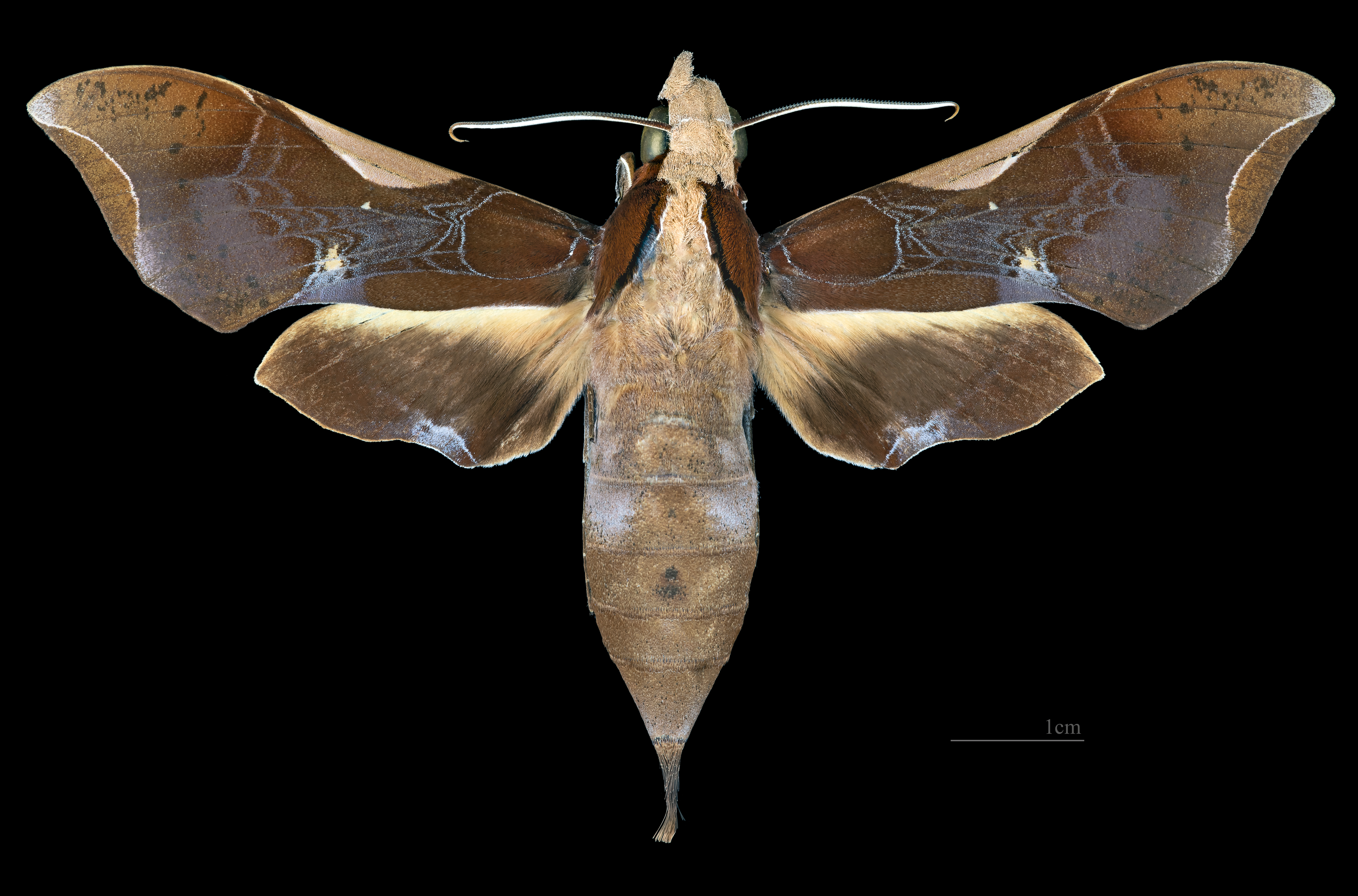
Female dorsal

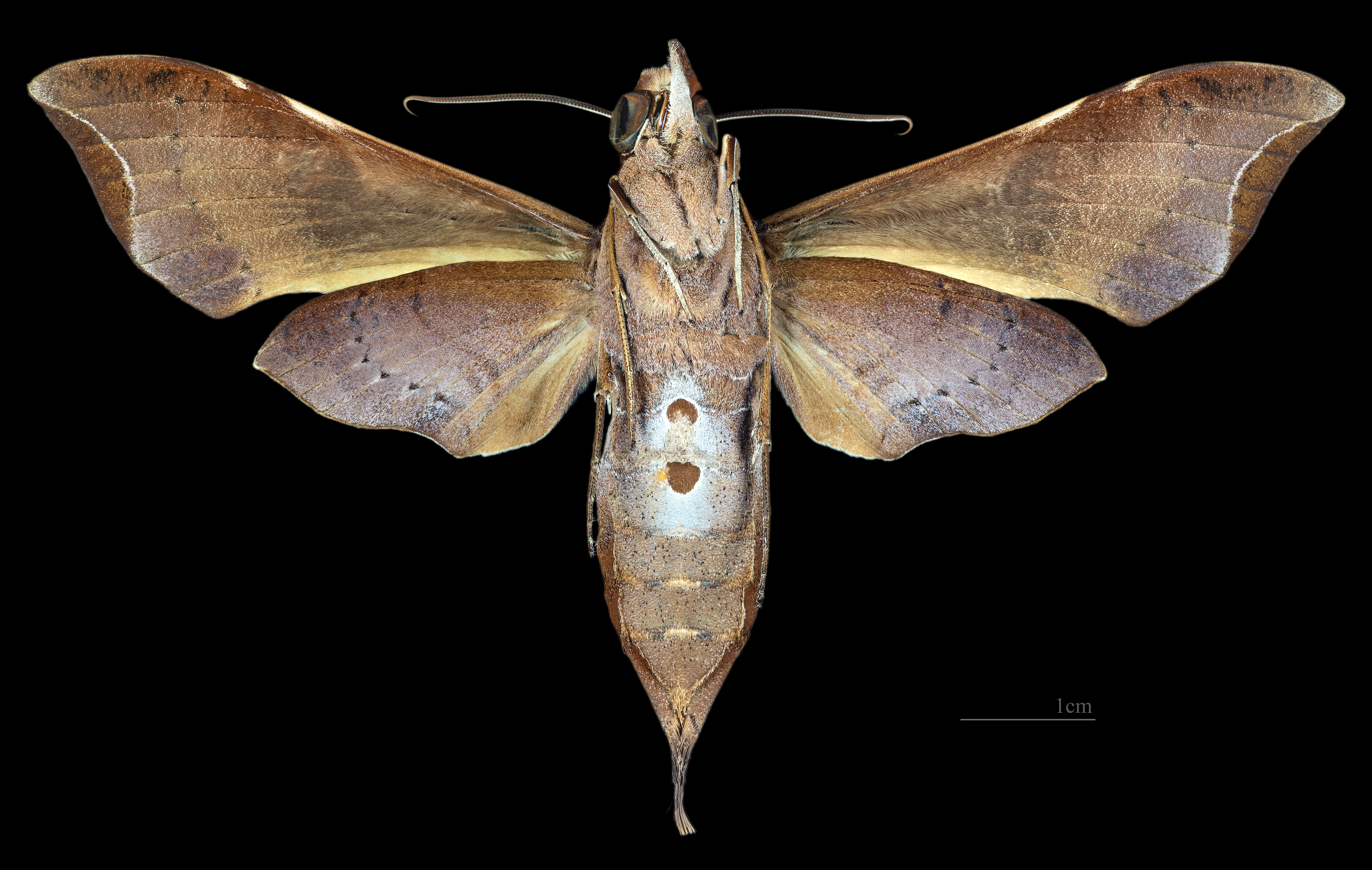
Female ventral

== Biology ==
Adults are on wing year round. Adults nectar at flowers, including Nicotiana forgetiana.

The larvae probably feed on Apocynaceae species, possibly including Aspidosperma macrocarpa.
