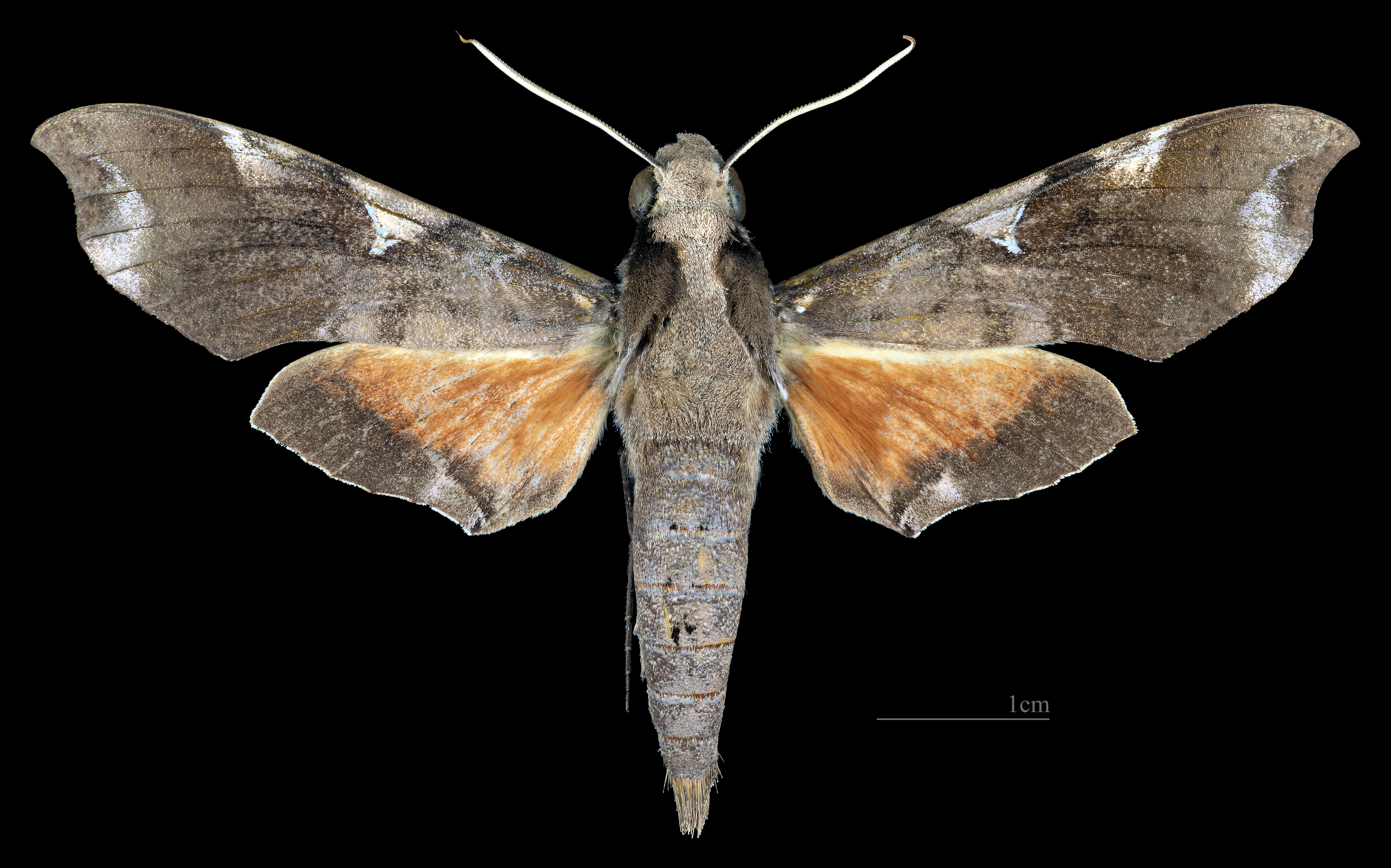
- Male dorsal
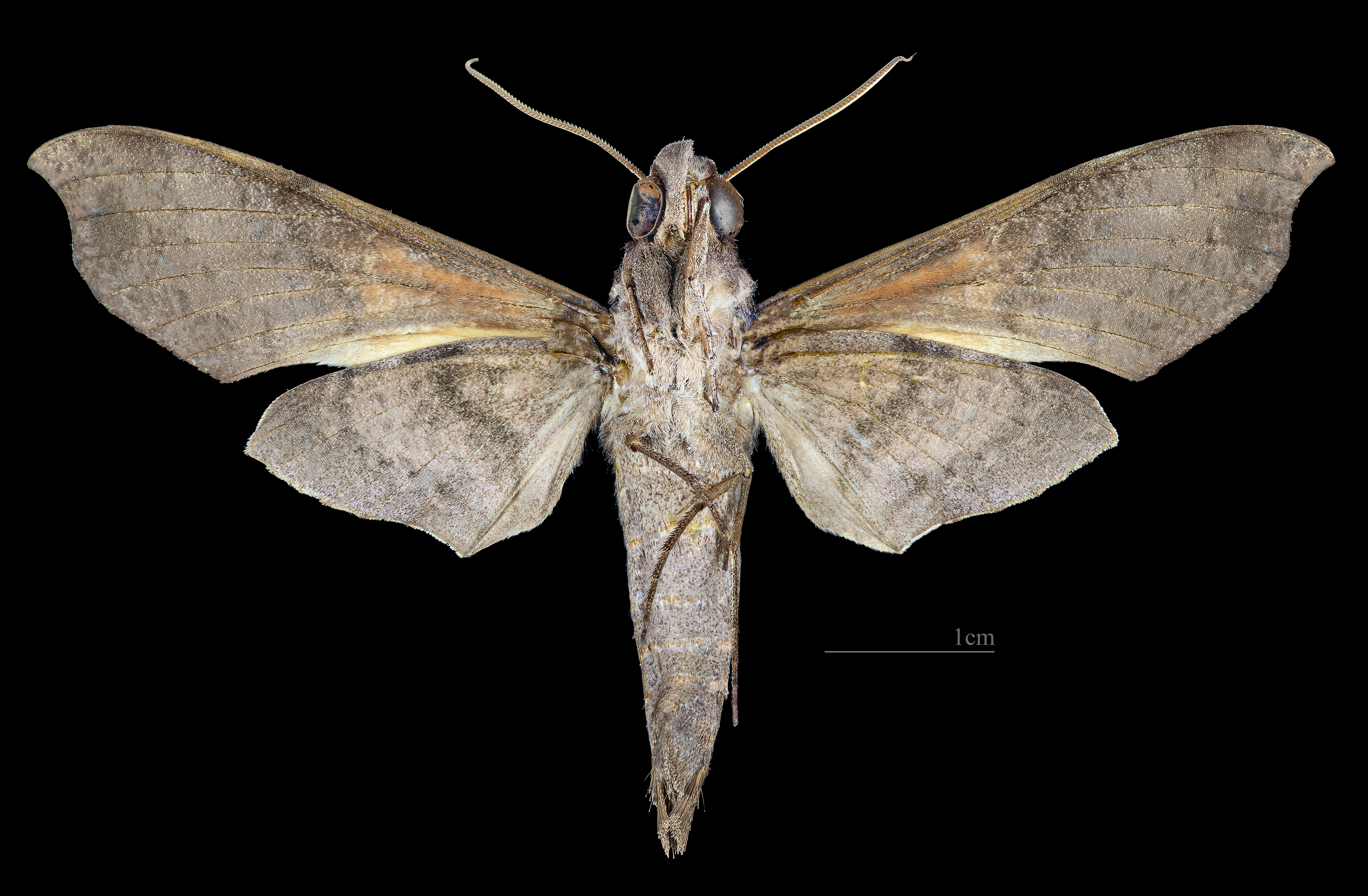
- Male ventral

Scientific classification
- Domain: Eukaryota
- Kingdom: Animalia
- Phylum: Arthropoda
- Class: Insecta
- Order: Lepidoptera
- Family: Sphingidae
- Genus: Callionima
- Species: C. acuta

Binomial name
- Callionima acuta (Rothschild & Jordan, 1910)

Synonyms
- Hemeroplanes acuta Rothschild & Jordan, 1910

= Callionima acuta =

Species of moth

Callionima acuta is a species of moth in the family Sphingidae. It was originally described by Walter Rothschild and Karl Jordan as Hemeroplanes acuta, in 1910.

== Distribution ==
Is known from Peru and Bolivia.

== Description ==
Males have a wingspan of about 32 millimetres. The species is similar to Callionima parce, but is darker in colour. The forewing upperside ground colour is blackish-brown. The hindwing underside has a median line and a line of dots in the outer half.

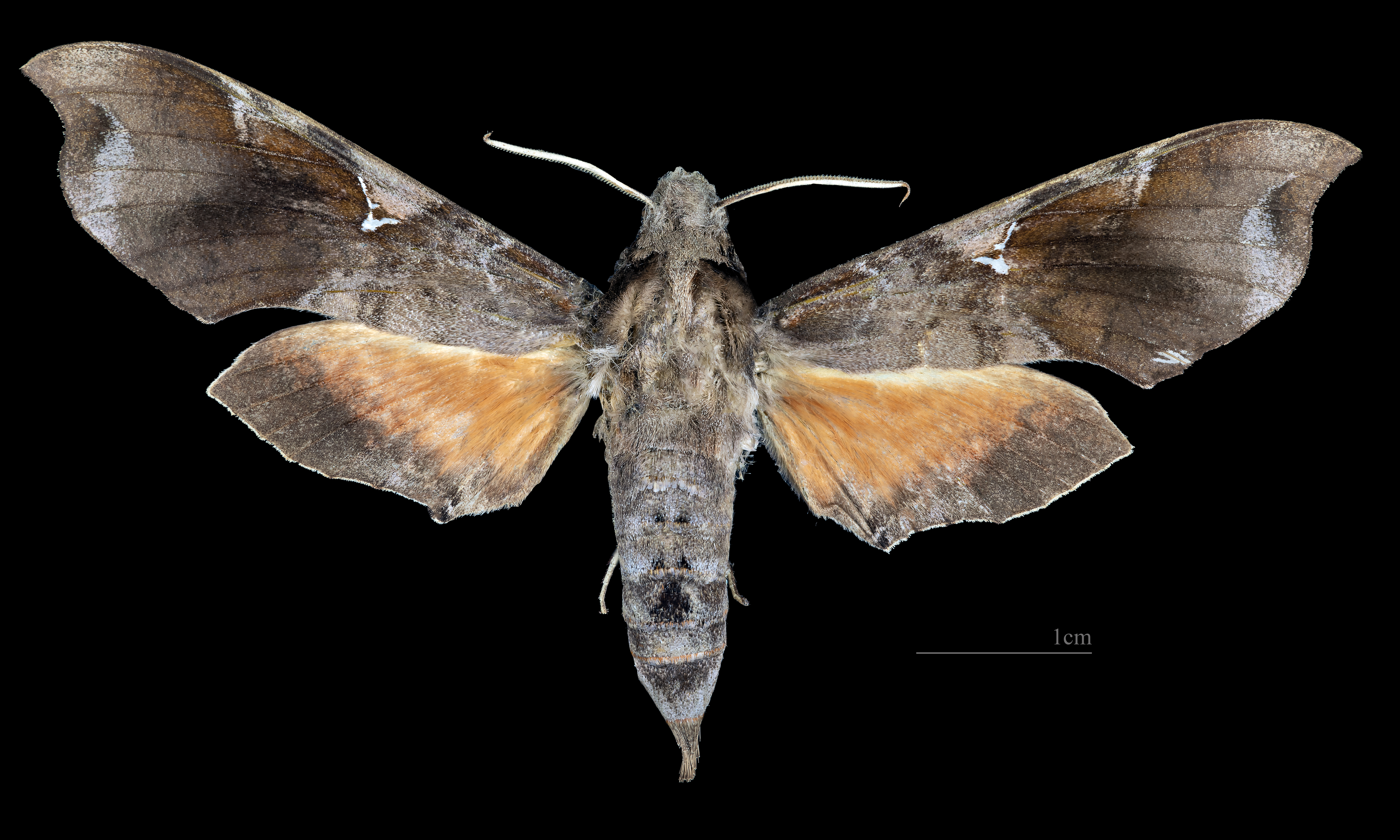
Callionima acuta ♀

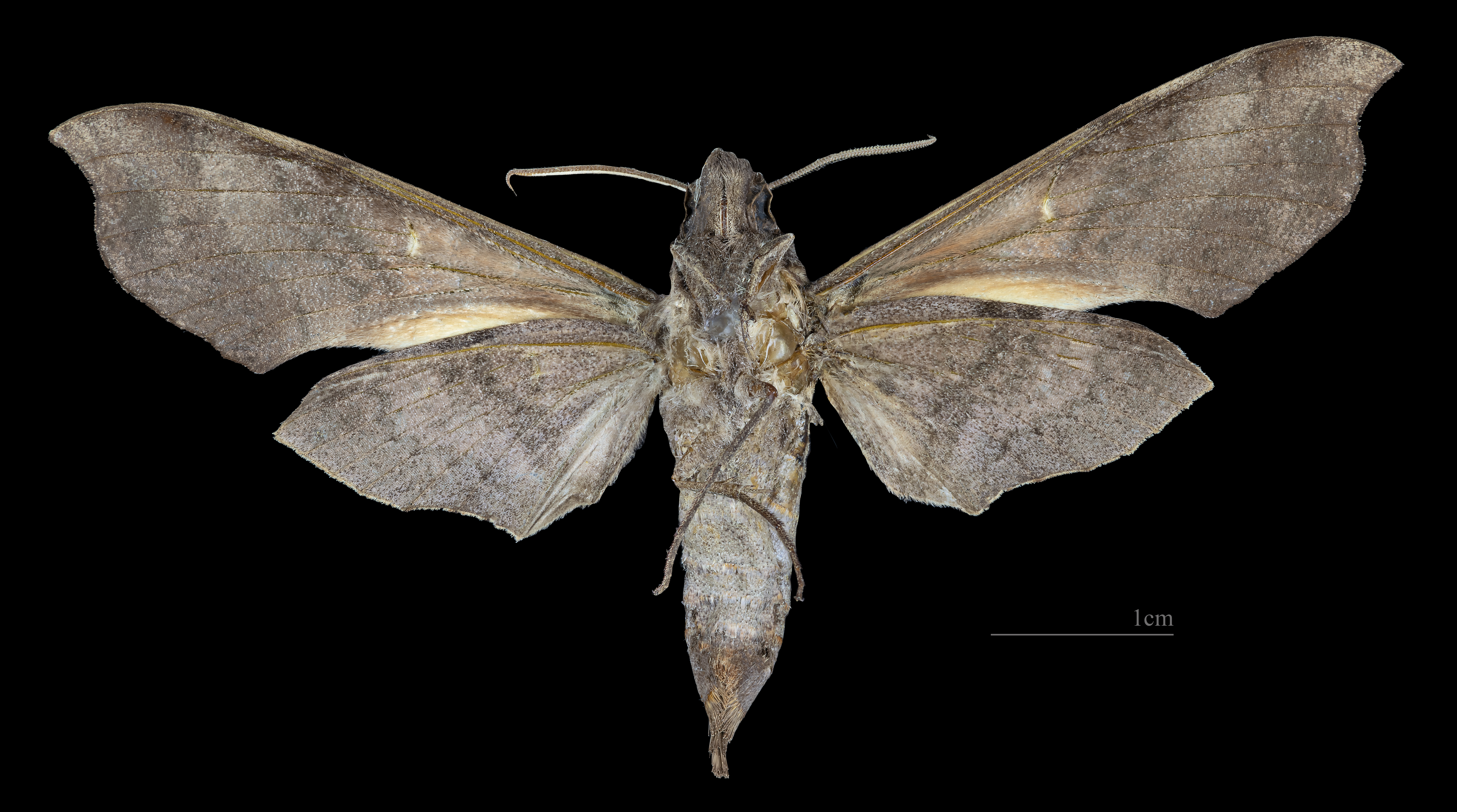
Callionima acuta ♀ △

== Biology ==
Adults are probably on wing in multiple generations.
