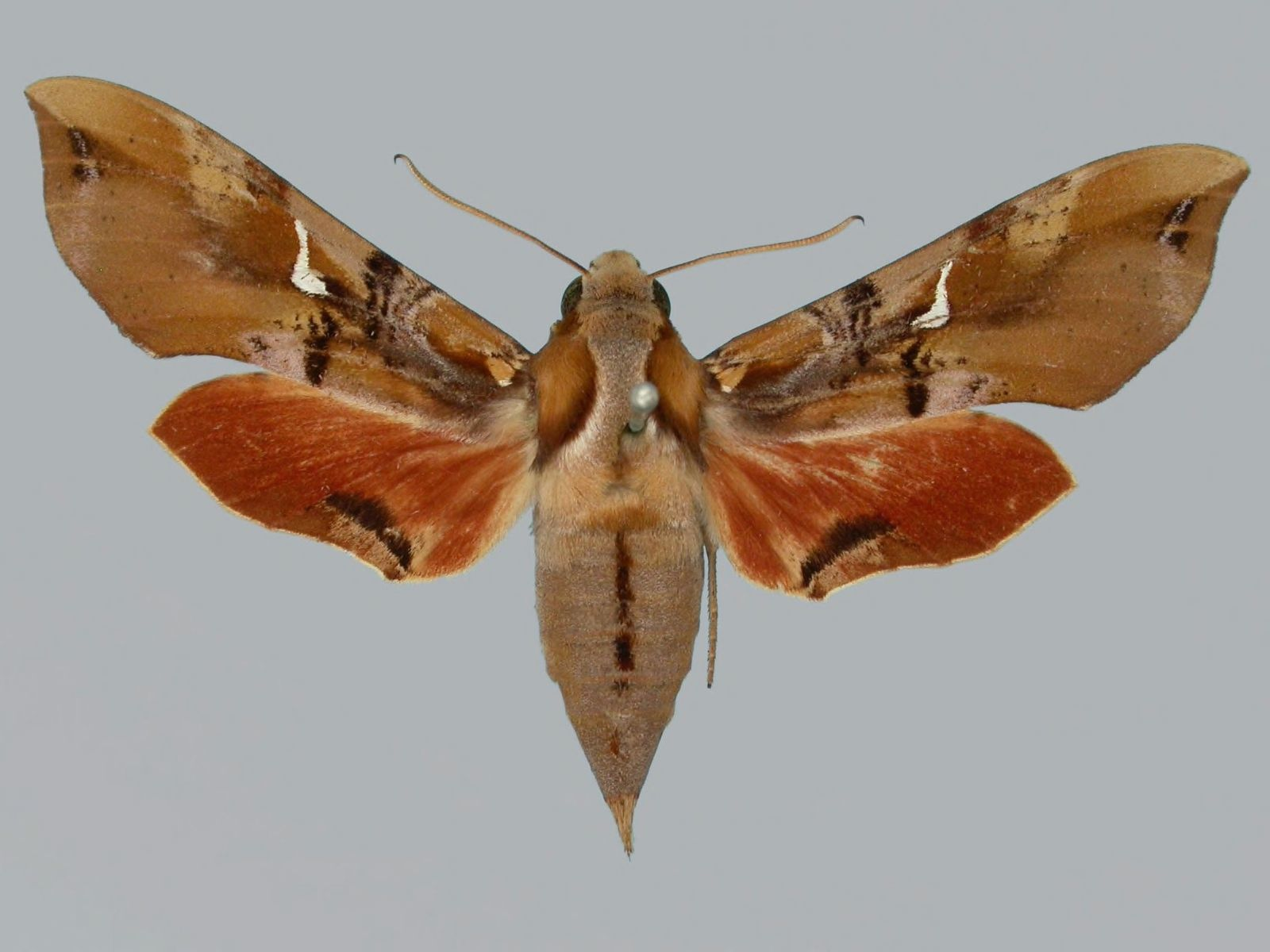
- Female

Scientific classification
- Kingdom: Animalia
- Phylum: Arthropoda
- Class: Insecta
- Order: Lepidoptera
- Family: Sphingidae
- Genus: Callionima
- Species: C. ramsdeni

Binomial name
- Callionima ramsdeni (Clark, 1920)

Synonyms
- Hemeroplanes ramsdeni Clark, 1920

= Callionima ramsdeni =

Species of moth

Callionima ramsdeni is a species of moth in the family Sphingidae which is known from Cuba. It was originally described by Benjamin Preston Clark in 1920.

It is similar to Callionima parce and Callionima falcifera falcifera but smaller and with a blunter and less acuminate (pointed) forewing apex. The tegulae are pale brown with a dark brown border, sharply tipped with white posteriorly. The forewing upperside has a patch of indistinct pale brown lunules, merged to form an amorphous patch. There is a sharply marked narrow line extending inward from the apex passing through two conspicuous black spots. The hindwing upperside has a single black band in the anal area, the area between this and the margin is pale.
