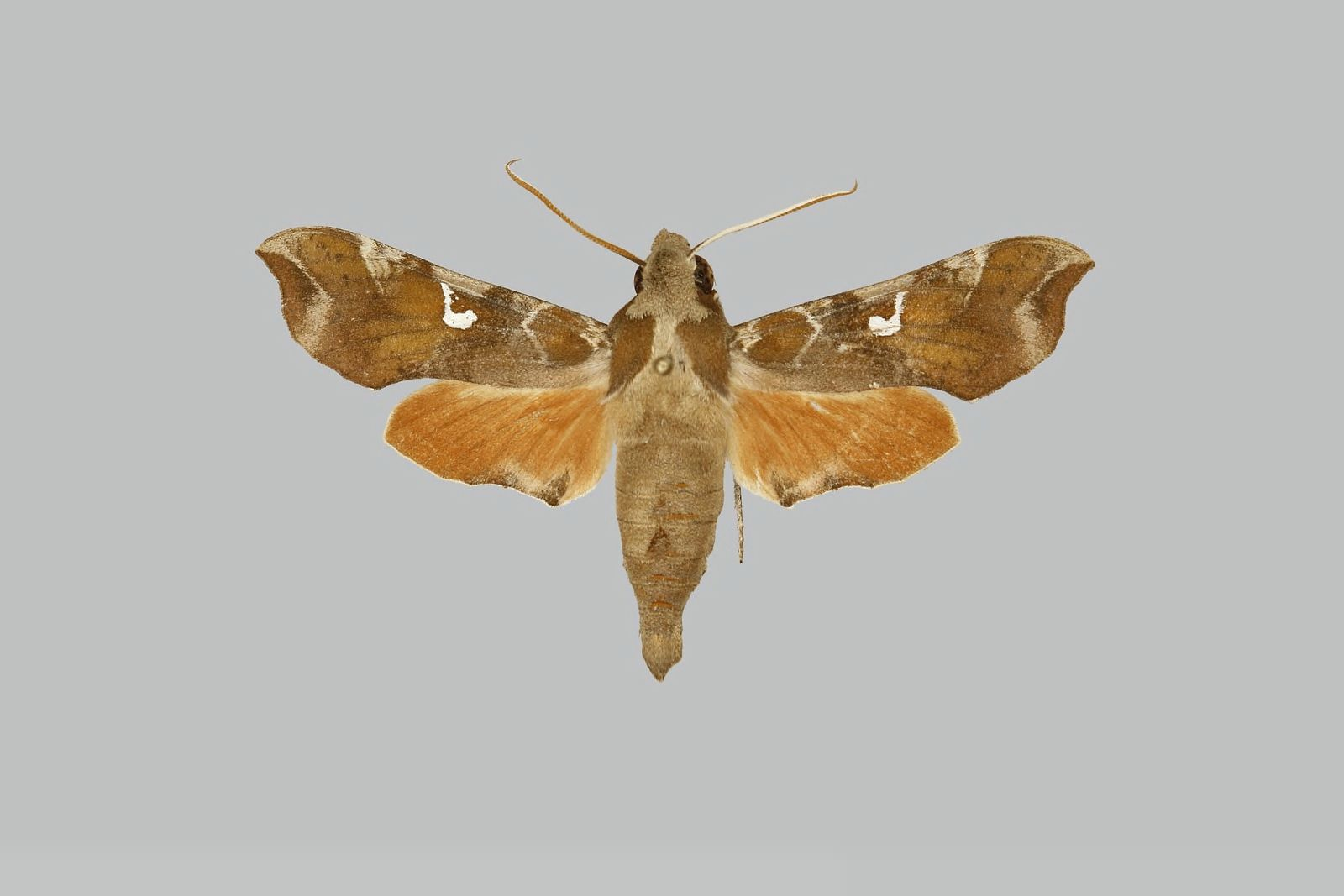
- Male

Scientific classification
- Kingdom: Animalia
- Phylum: Arthropoda
- Class: Insecta
- Order: Lepidoptera
- Family: Sphingidae
- Genus: Callionima
- Species: C. juliane

Binomial name
- Callionima juliane Eitschberger, 2000

= Callionima juliane =

Species of moth

Callionima juliane is a species of moth in the family Sphingidae, which is known from Peru. It was described by Ulf Eitschberger in 2000.

The larvae possibly feed on Aspidosperma macrocarpa or other Apocynaceae species.
