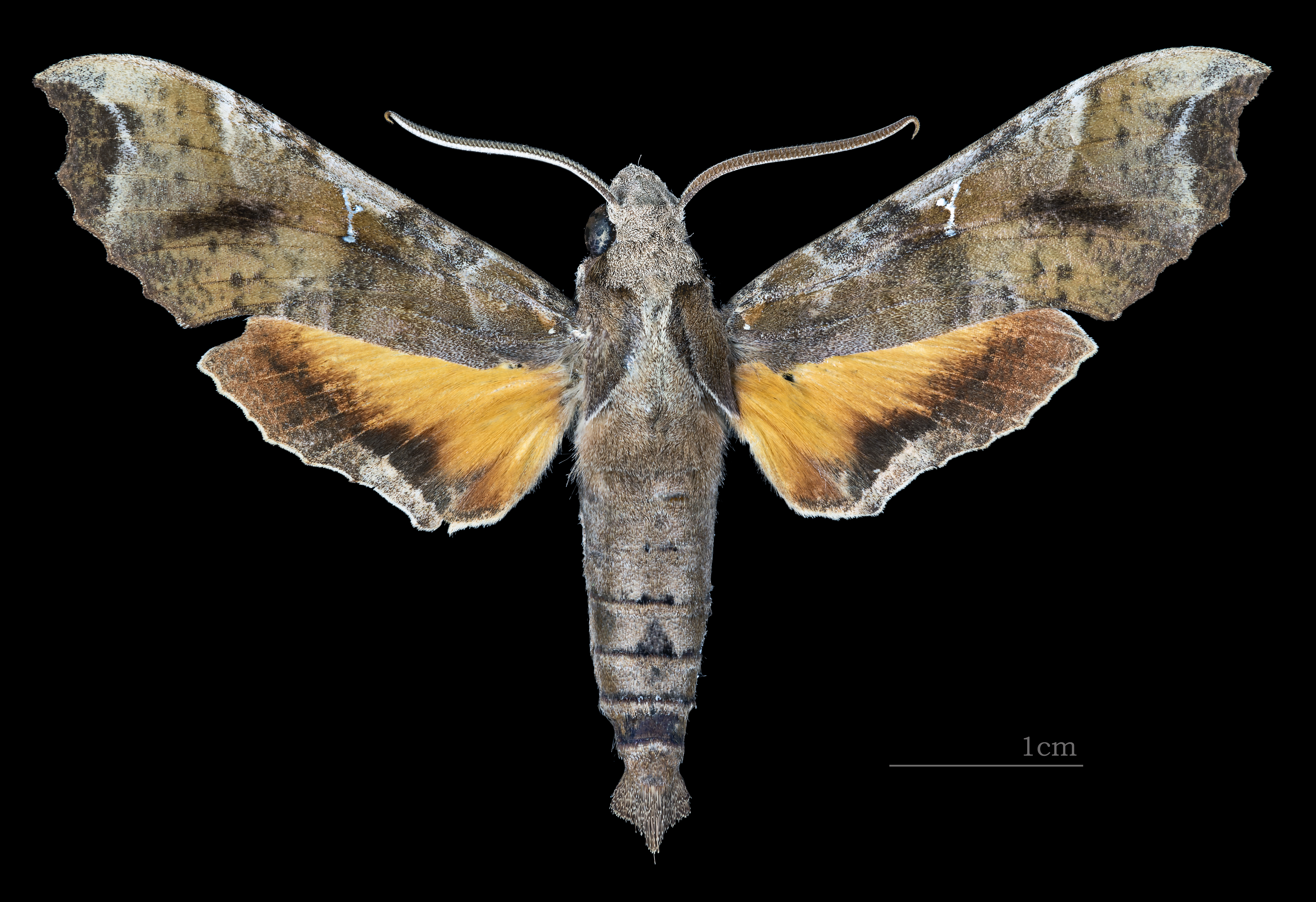
- Callionima calliomenae, Male Dorsal
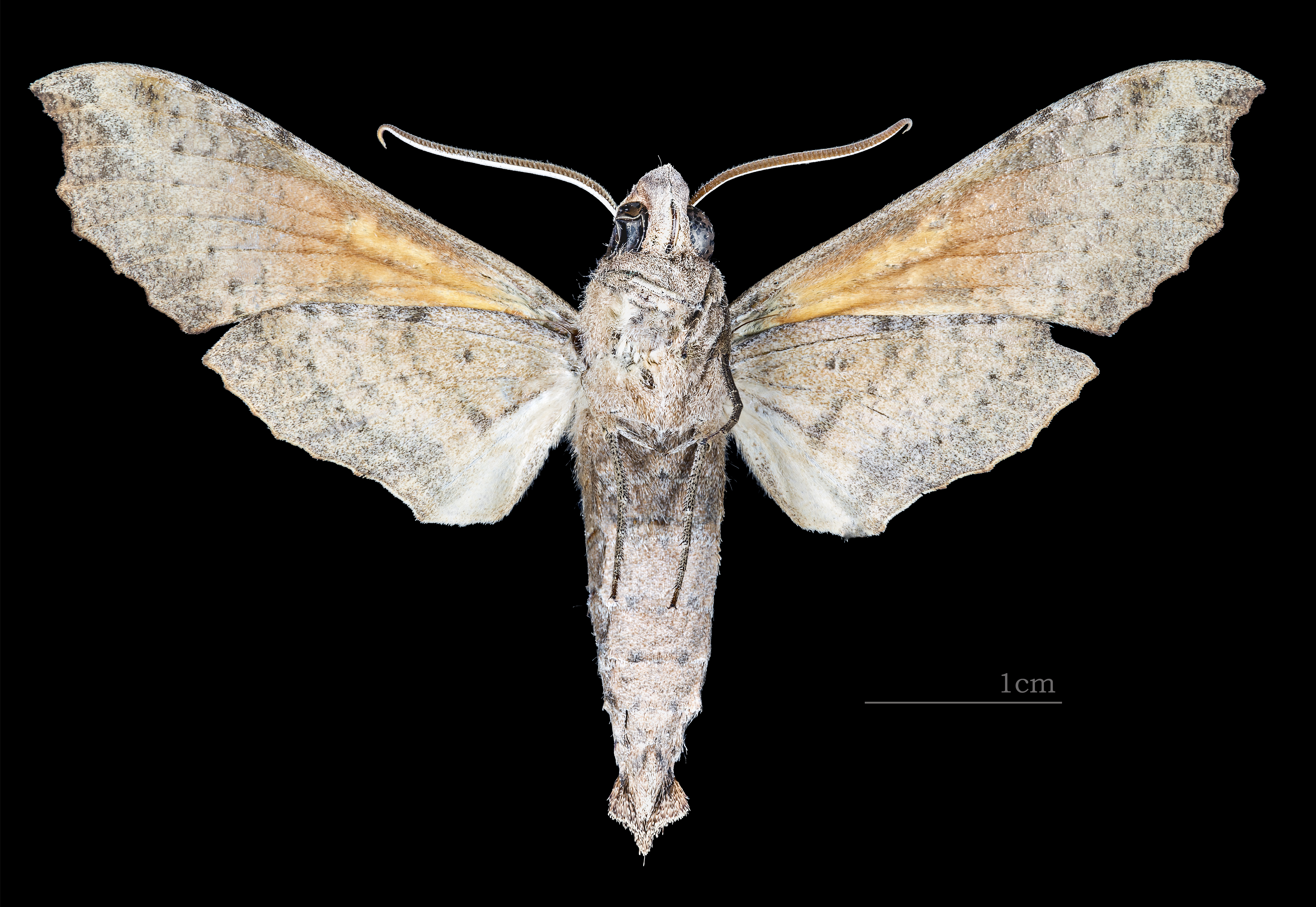
- Callionima calliomenae, Male ventral

Scientific classification
- Kingdom: Animalia
- Phylum: Arthropoda
- Class: Insecta
- Order: Lepidoptera
- Family: Sphingidae
- Genus: Callionima
- Species: C. calliomenae

Binomial name
- Callionima calliomenae (Schaufuss, 1870)

Synonyms
- Philampelus calliomenae Schaufuss, 1870; Calliomma ellacombei Rothschild, 1894; Calliomma lutescens Butler, 1875

= Callionima calliomenae =

Species of moth

Callionima calliomenae is a moth of the family Sphingidae.

== Distribution ==
It is known to inhabit Venezuela, Haiti and the Dominican Republic.

== Description ==
The wingspan is about 67 mm. It is immediately distinguishable from all other Callionima species by the regularly dentate outer forewing margin that is only slightly excavate below the apex and the dark yellow basal half to the hindwing upperside.

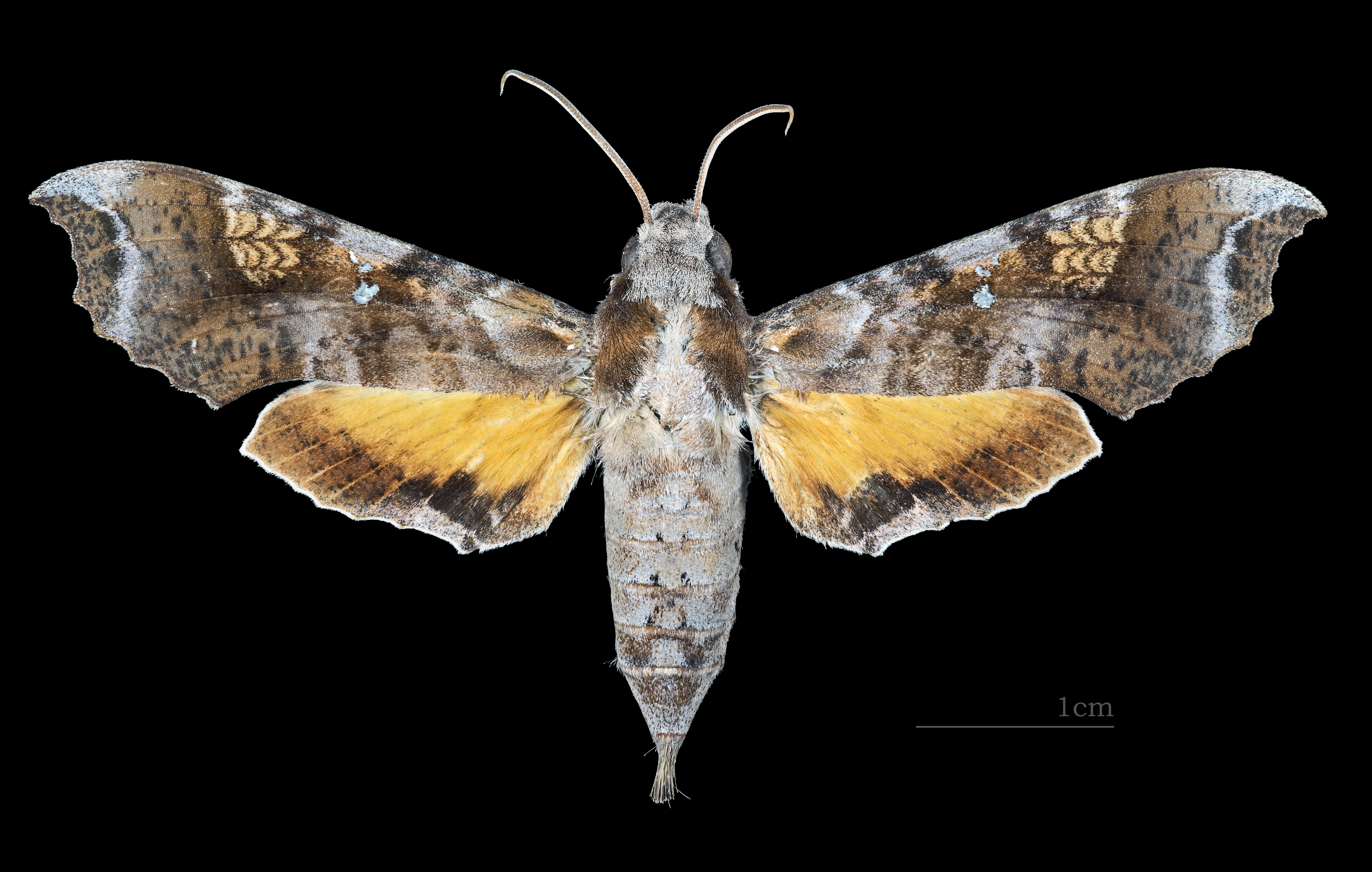
Female dorsal
(coll.MHNT)

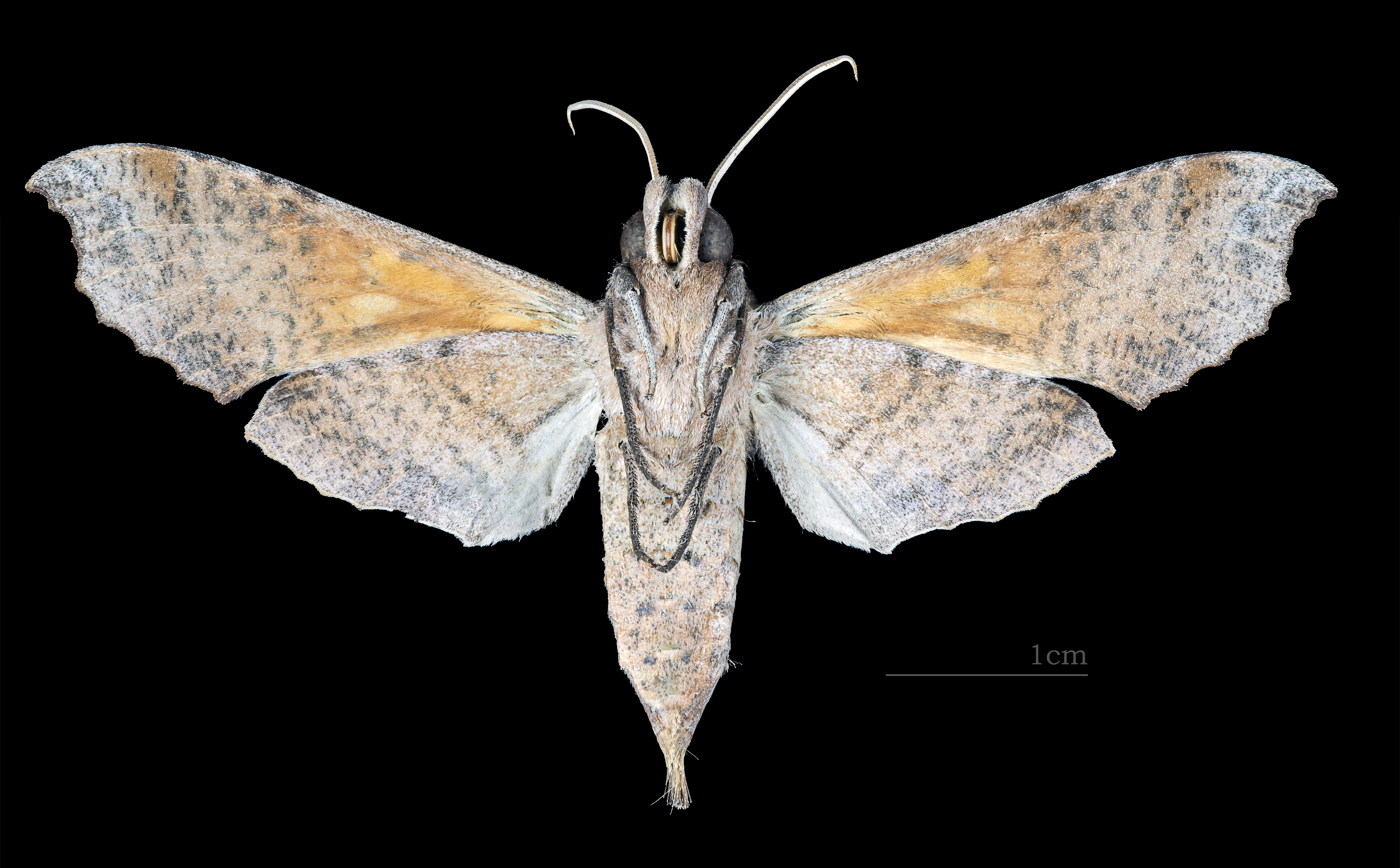
Female ventral
(coll.MHNT)

== Biology ==
There are probably multiple generations per year.
