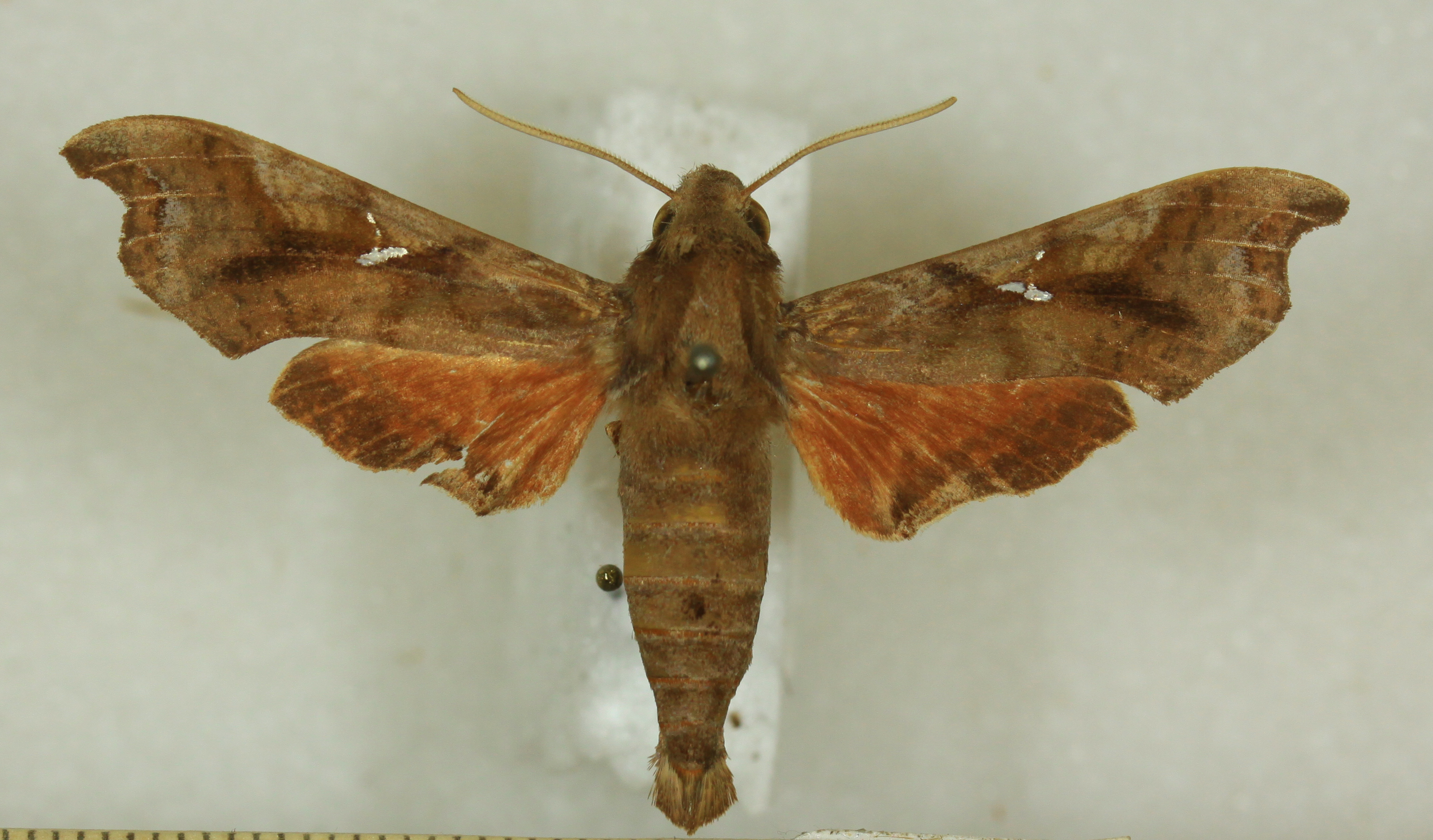

Scientific classification
- Kingdom: Animalia
- Phylum: Arthropoda
- Class: Insecta
- Order: Lepidoptera
- Family: Sphingidae
- Genus: Callionima
- Species: C. gracilis

Binomial name
- Callionima gracilis (Jordan, 1923)

Synonyms
- Hemeroplanes gracilis Jordan, 1923

= Callionima gracilis =

Species of moth

Callionima gracilis is a species of moth in the family Sphingidae. It was originally described by Karl Jordan as Hemeroplanes gracilis in 1923. It is endemic to Cuba.

Adults are probably on wing in multiple generations. In size and colour, it is similar to Callionima grisescens, but with a truncate forewing apex, strongly excavate below, and a larger silver spot on the forewing upperside, clearly divided into two branches. The forewing upperside has the lower branch of the silver spot within a diagnostic ill-defined, longitudinal black band running between the antemedian and submarginal lines through the centre of the wing.
