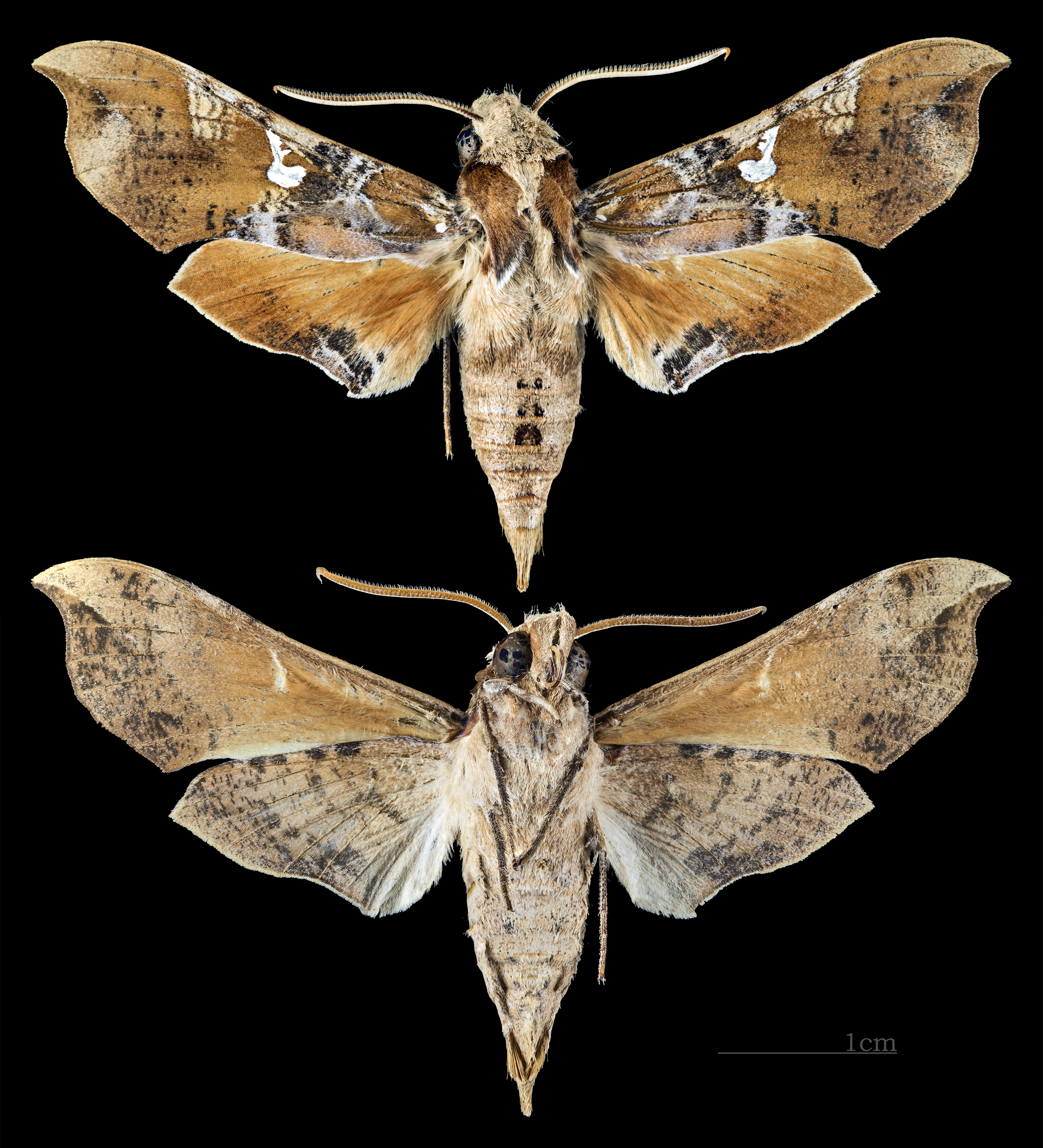
- Callionima parce

Scientific classification
- Domain: Eukaryota
- Kingdom: Animalia
- Phylum: Arthropoda
- Class: Insecta
- Order: Lepidoptera
- Family: Sphingidae
- Subtribe: Dilophonotina
- Genus: Callionima; H. Lucas, 1857

Species
- See text

Synonyms
- Calliomma Walker, 1856; Eucheryx Boisduval, 1875

= Callionima =

Genus of moths

Callionima is a genus of moths in the family Sphingidae first described by Hippolyte Lucas in 1857.

== Species ==
- Callionima acuta (Rothschild & Jordan, 1910)
- Callionima calliomenae (Schaufuss, 1870)
- Callionima denticulata (Schaus, 1895)
- Callionima elainae (Neidhoefer, 1968)
- Callionima ellacombei (Rothschild, 1894)
- Callionima falcifera (Gehlen, 1943)
- Callionima gracilis (Jordan, 1923)
- Callionima grisescens (Rothschild, 1894)
- Callionima guiarti (Debauche, 1934)
- Callionima inuus (Rothschild & Jordan, 1903)
- Callionima juliane Eitschberger, 2000
- Callionima nomius (Walker, 1856)
- Callionima pan (Cramer, 1779)
- Callionima parce (Fabricius, 1775) type species for the genus
- Callionima ramsdeni (Clark, 1920)

names brought to synonymy

- Callionima elegans (Gehlen., 1935), a synonym for Callionima grisescens
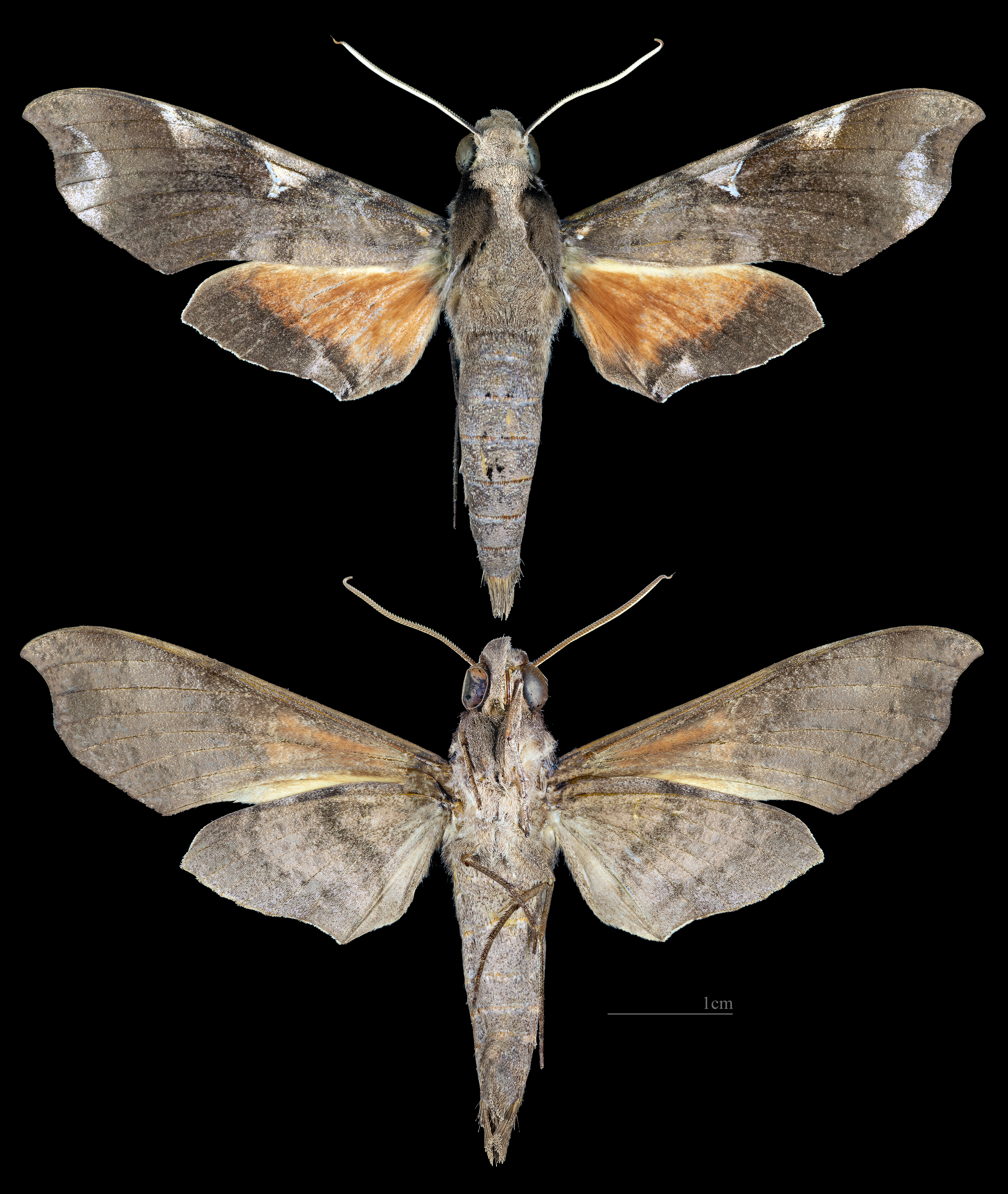
Callionima acuta

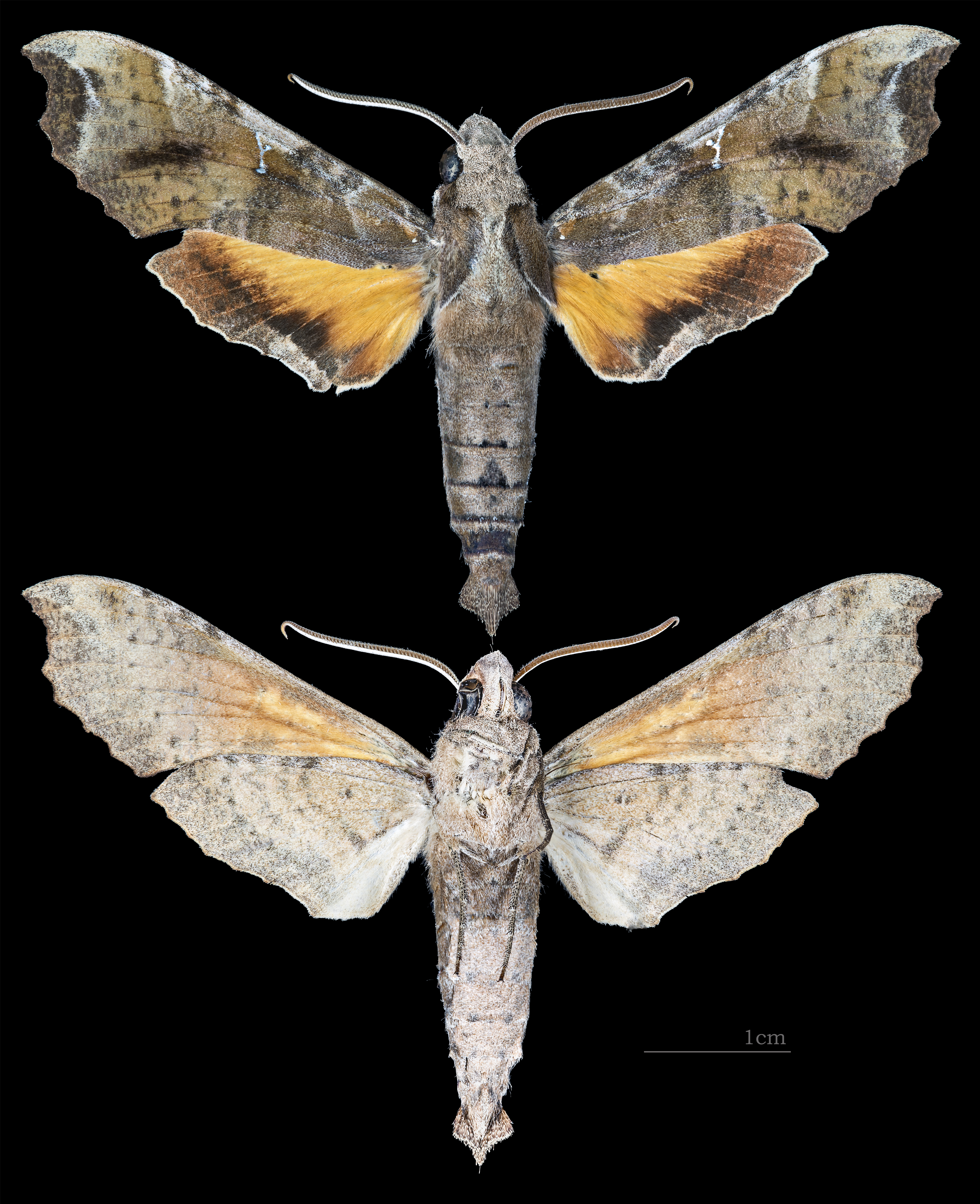
Callionima calliomenae

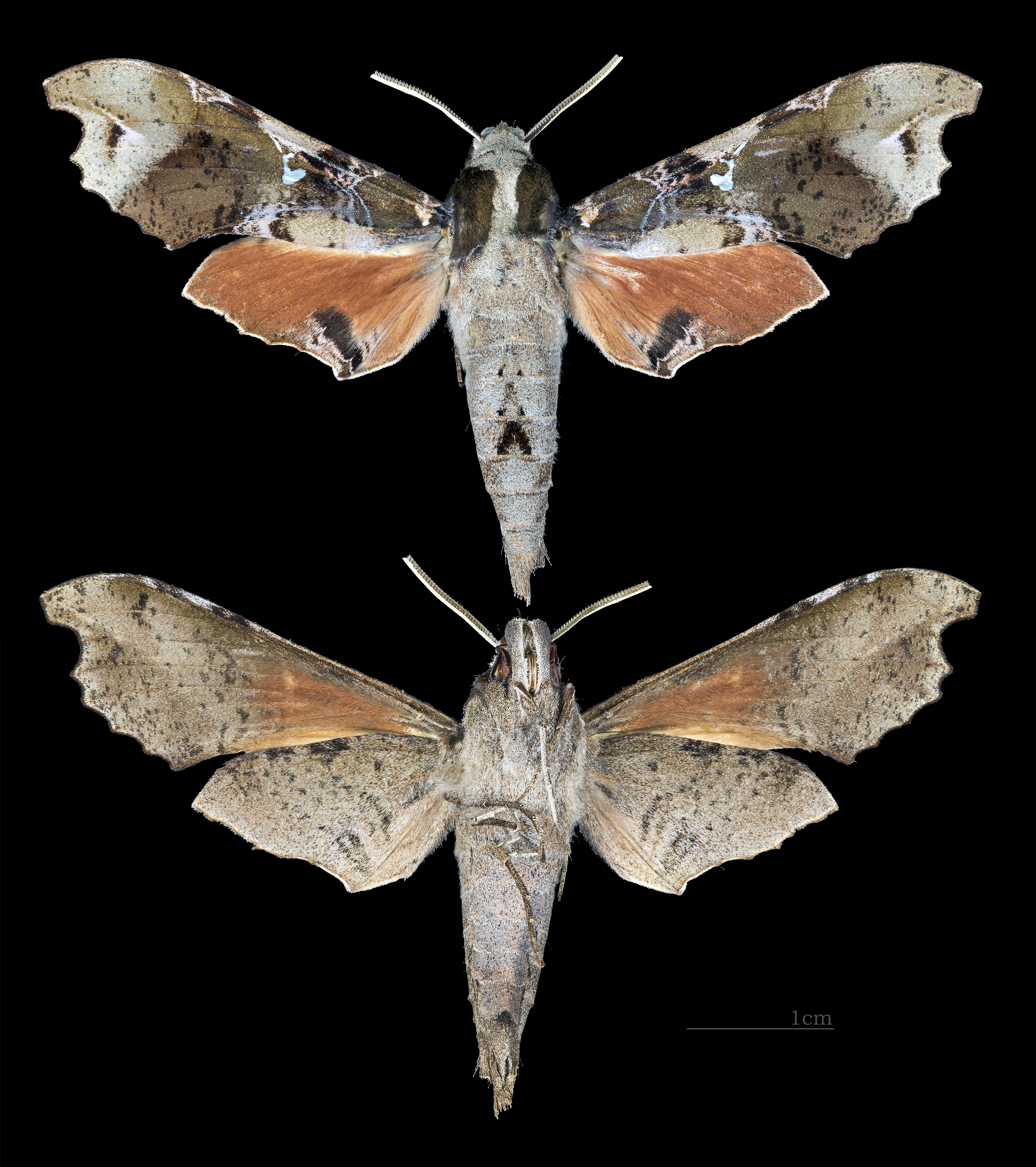
Callionima denticulata

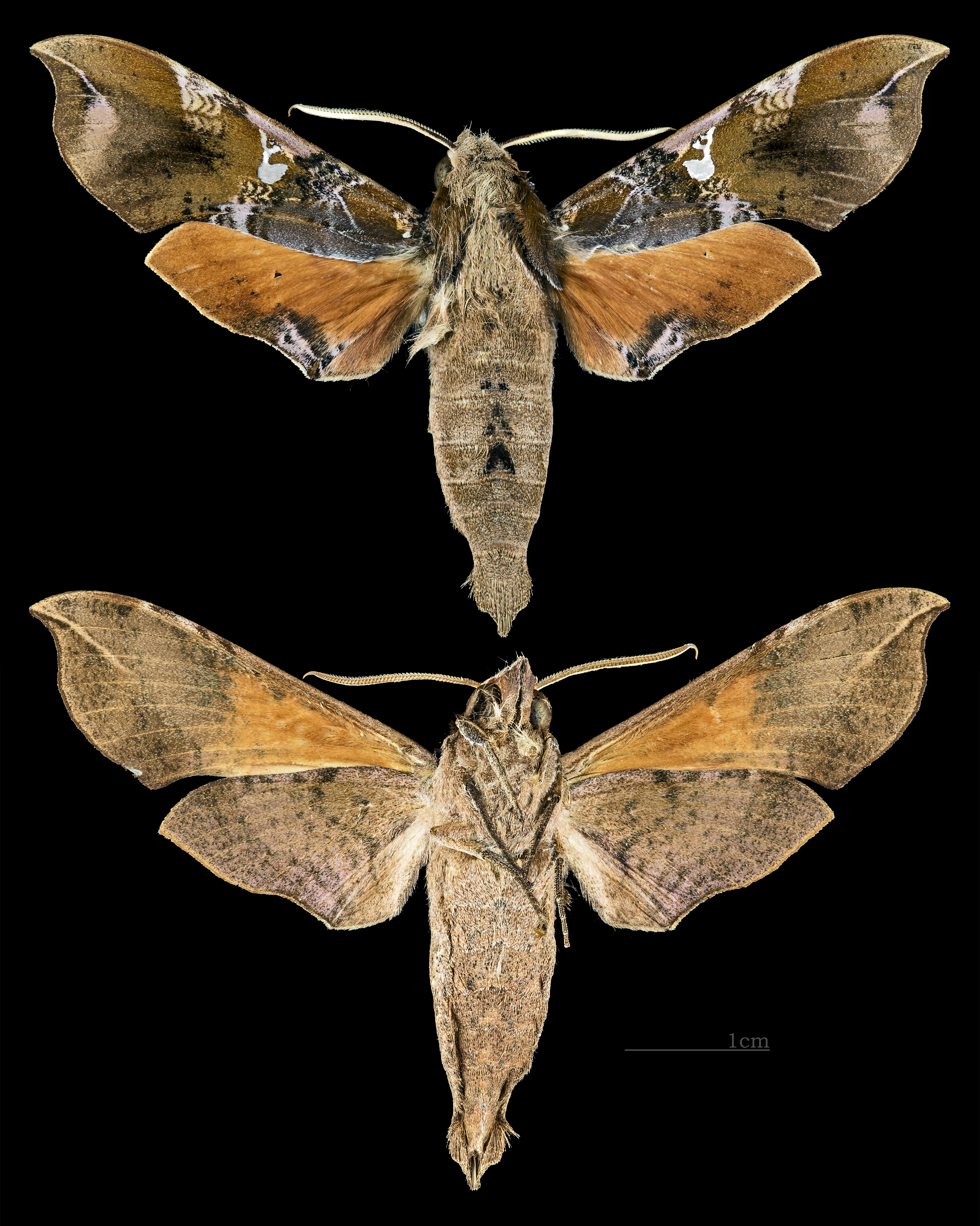
Callionima falcifera

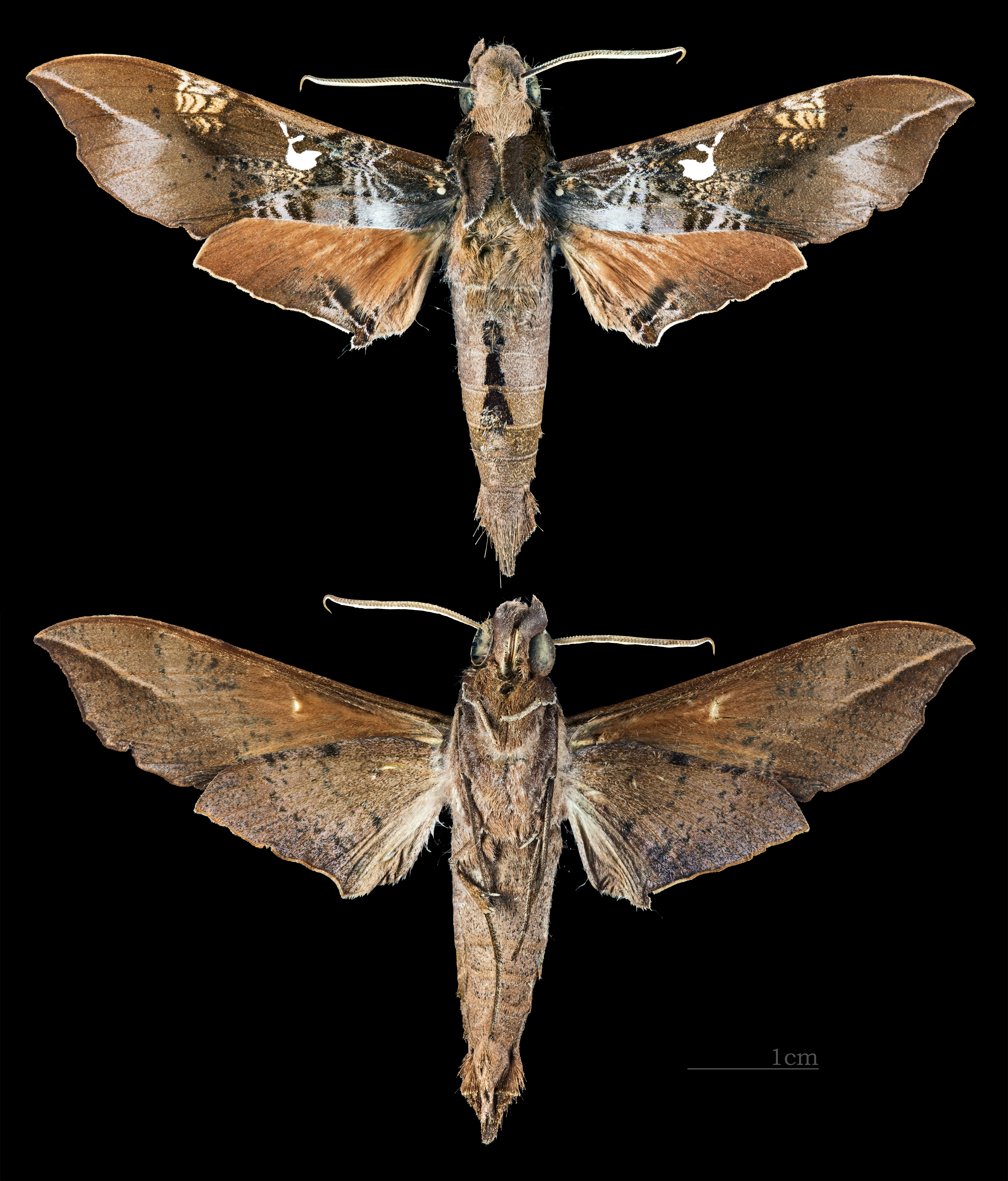
Callionima inuus

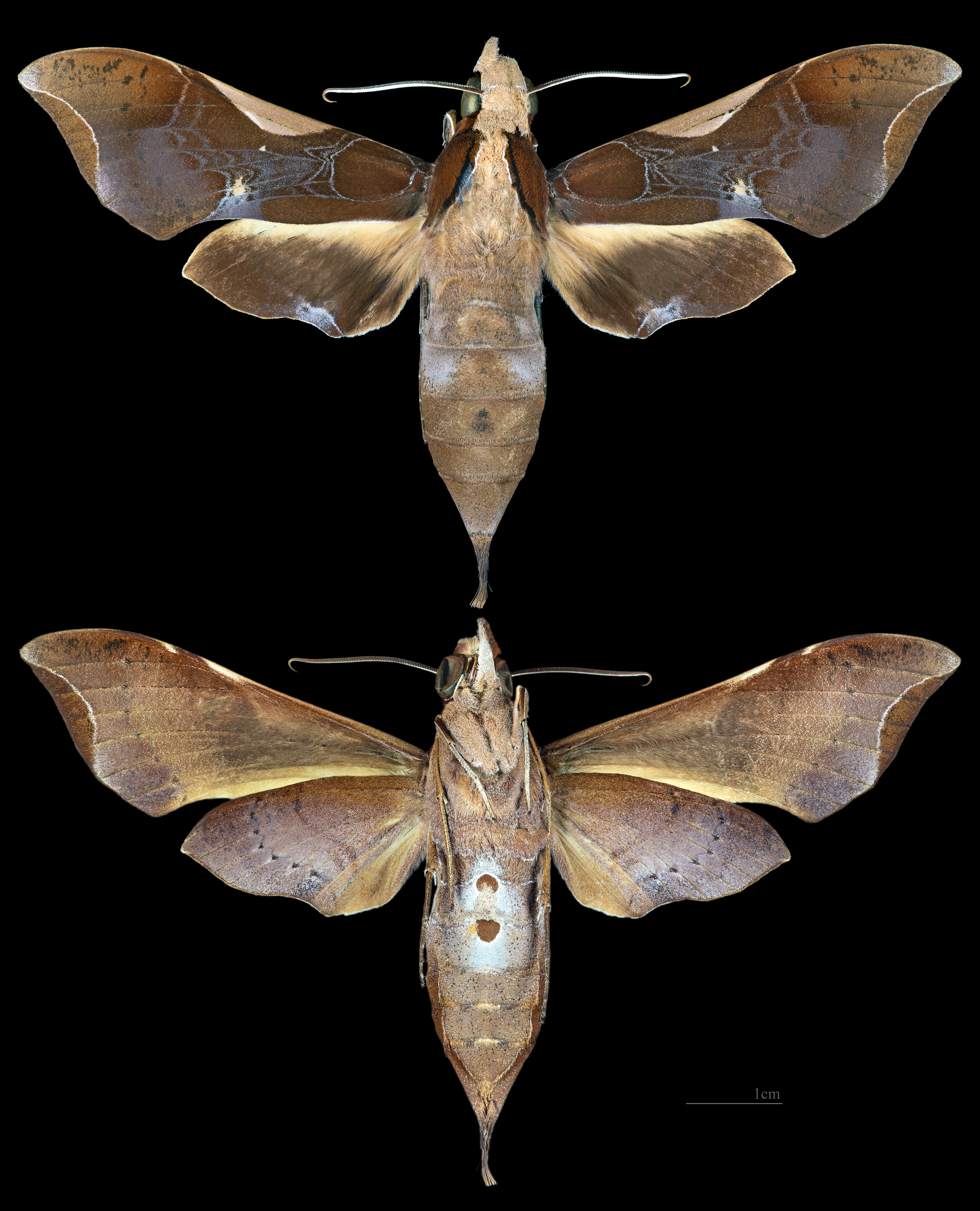
Callionima nomius

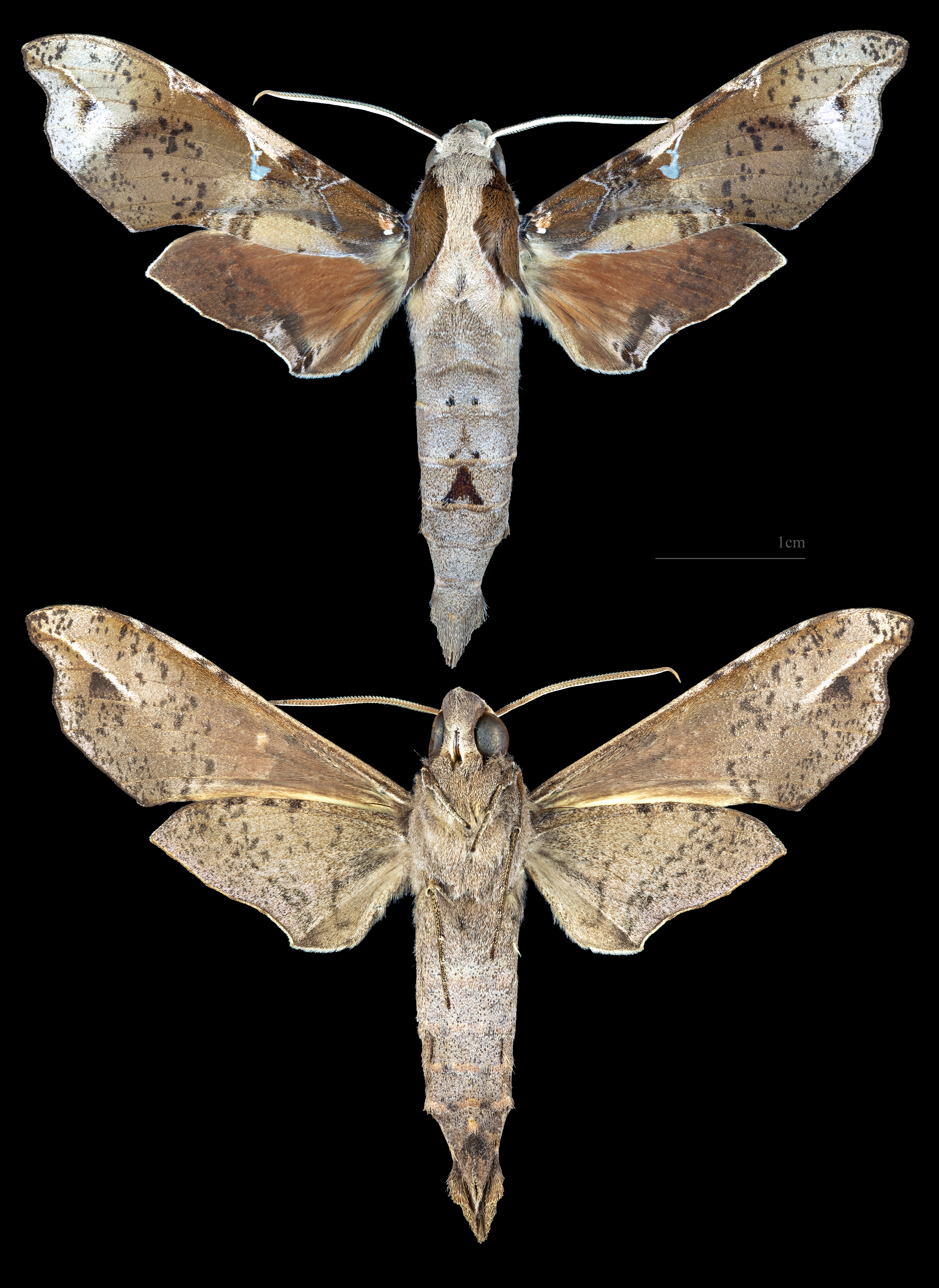
Callionima pan

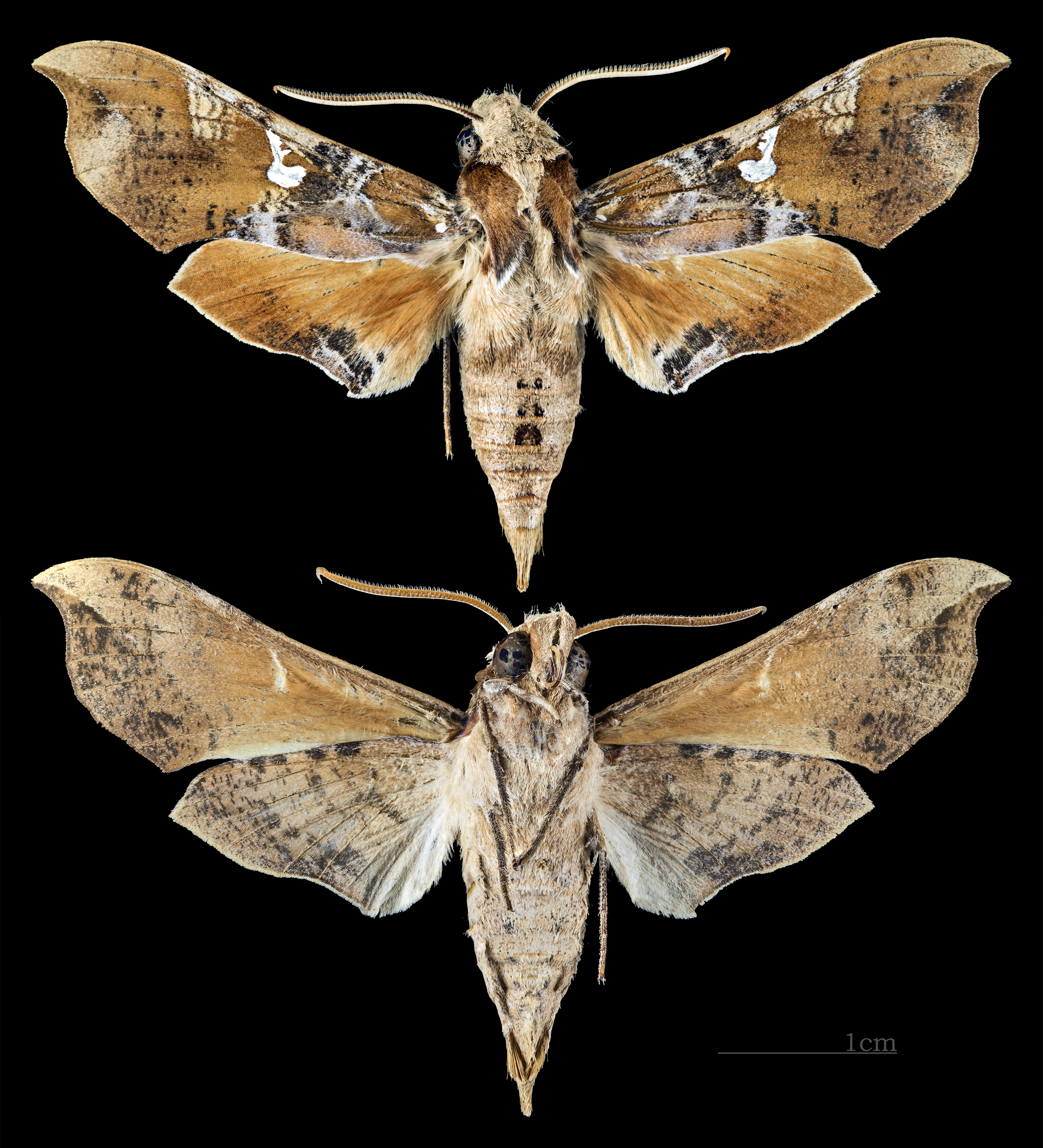
Callionima parce
