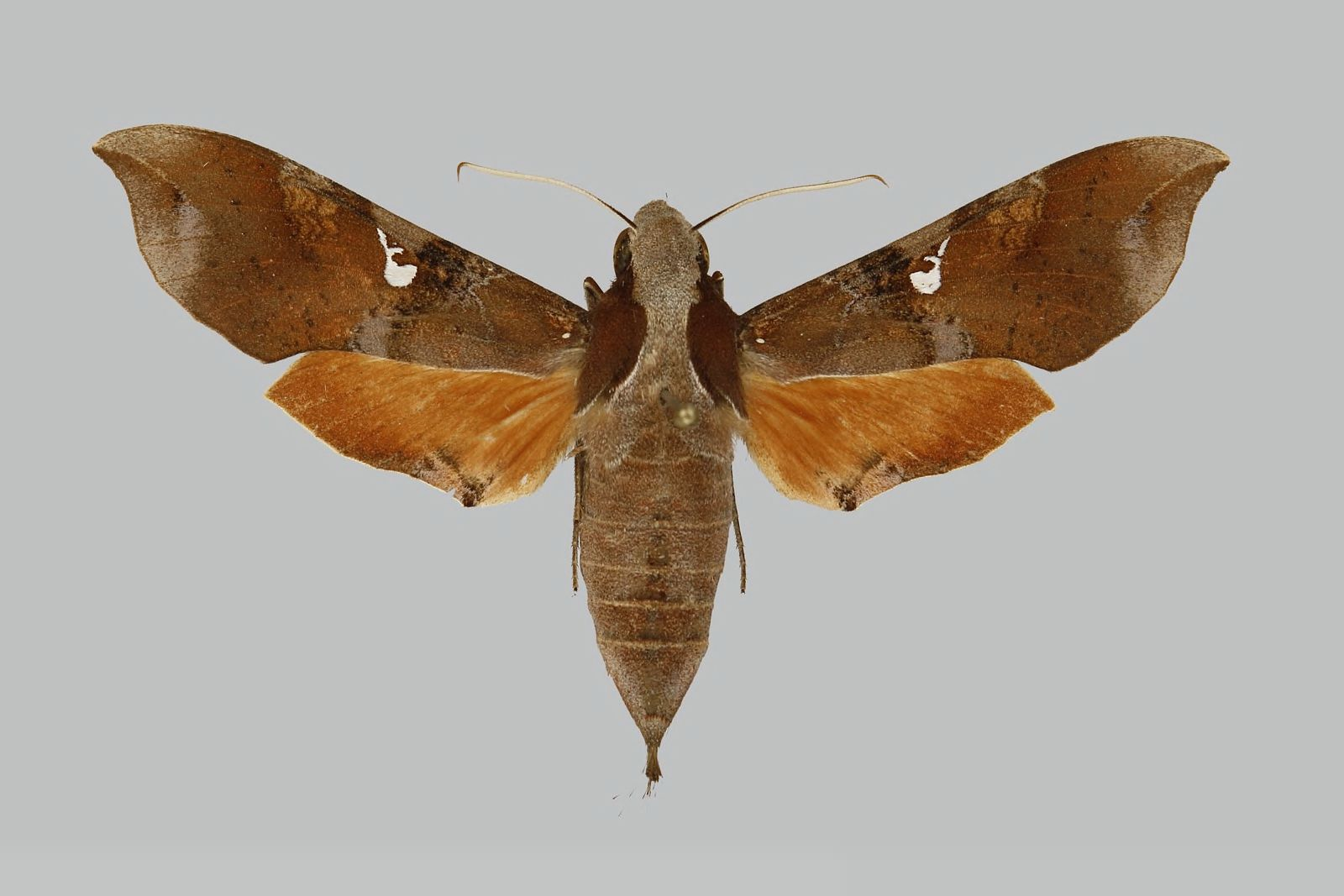
- Female

Scientific classification
- Kingdom: Animalia
- Phylum: Arthropoda
- Class: Insecta
- Order: Lepidoptera
- Family: Sphingidae
- Genus: Callionima
- Species: C. guiarti

Binomial name
- Callionima guiarti (Debauche, 1934)

Synonyms
- Hemeroplanes guiarti Debauche, 1934; Hemeroplanes modesta Gehlen, 1950

= Callionima guiarti =

Species of moth

Callionima guiarti is a species of moth in the family Sphingidae, which is known from Brazil. It was described by Hubert Robert Debauche in 1934, and is similar to Callionima parce, but is more uniformly brown in colour.
