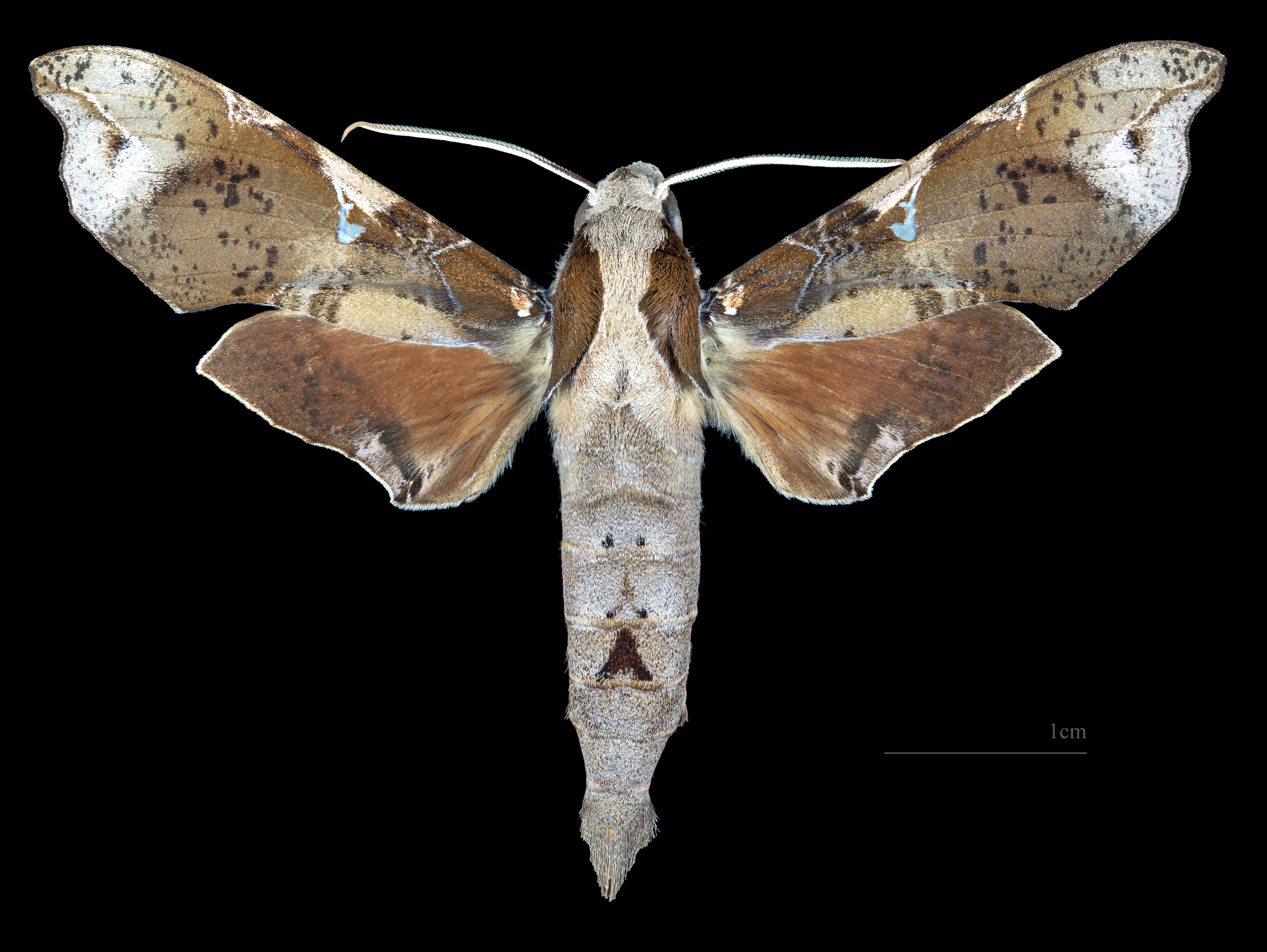
- Male dorsal
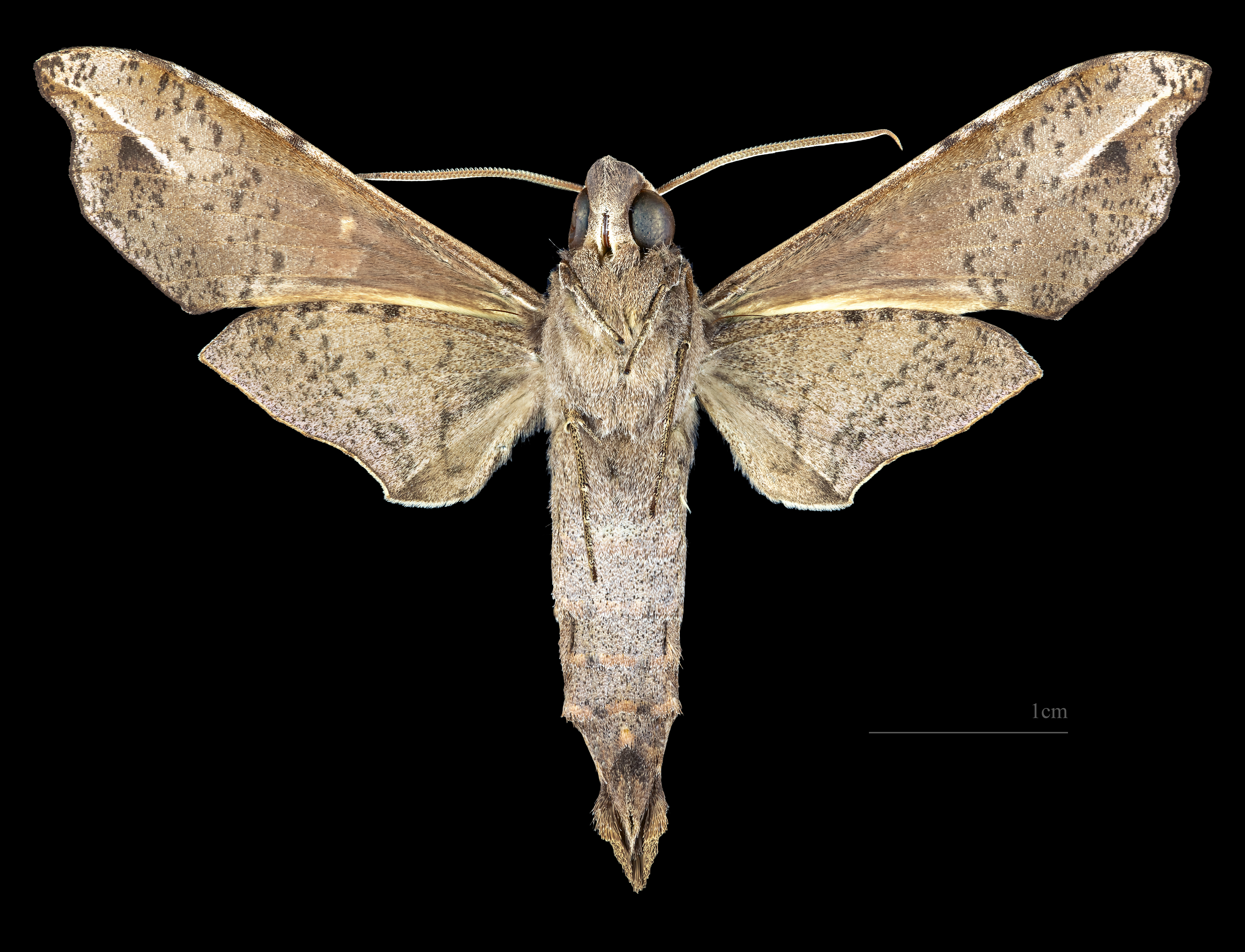
- Male ventral

Scientific classification
- Domain: Eukaryota
- Kingdom: Animalia
- Phylum: Arthropoda
- Class: Insecta
- Order: Lepidoptera
- Family: Sphingidae
- Genus: Callionima
- Species: C. pan

Binomial name
- Callionima pan (Cramer, 1779)

Synonyms
- Sphinx pan Cramer, 1779; Calliomma pan neivai Oiticica Filho, 1940

= Callionima pan =

Species of moth

Callionima pan is a species of moth in the family Sphingidae. It was originally described by Pieter Cramer in 1779.

== Distribution ==
It is found from Mexico, Guatemala and Costa Rica through Venezuela to southern Brazil.

== Description ==
The wingspan is about 64 mm. There are probably two to three generations per year, with adults on wing from April to June and from October to January in Costa Rica.

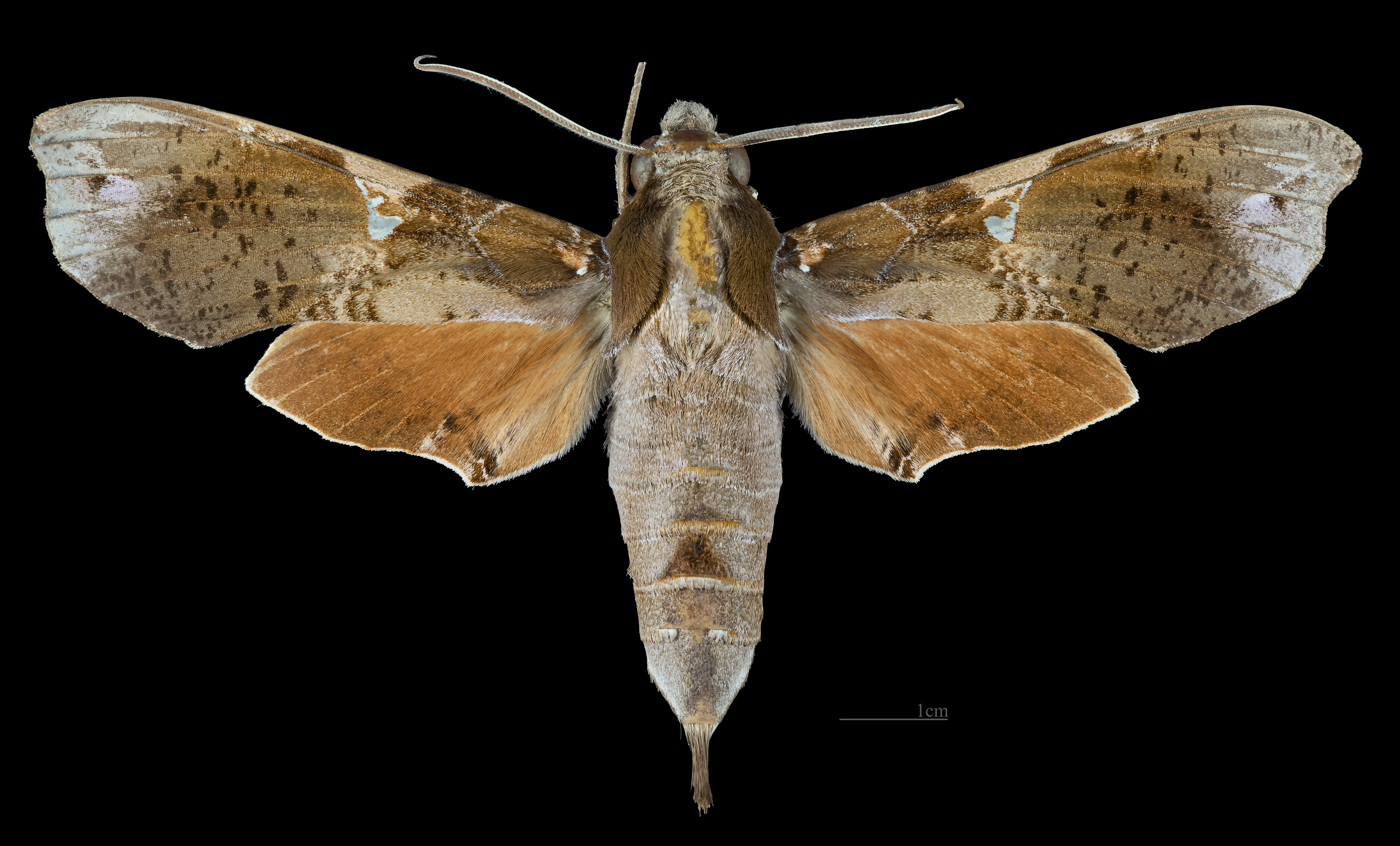
Female dorsal

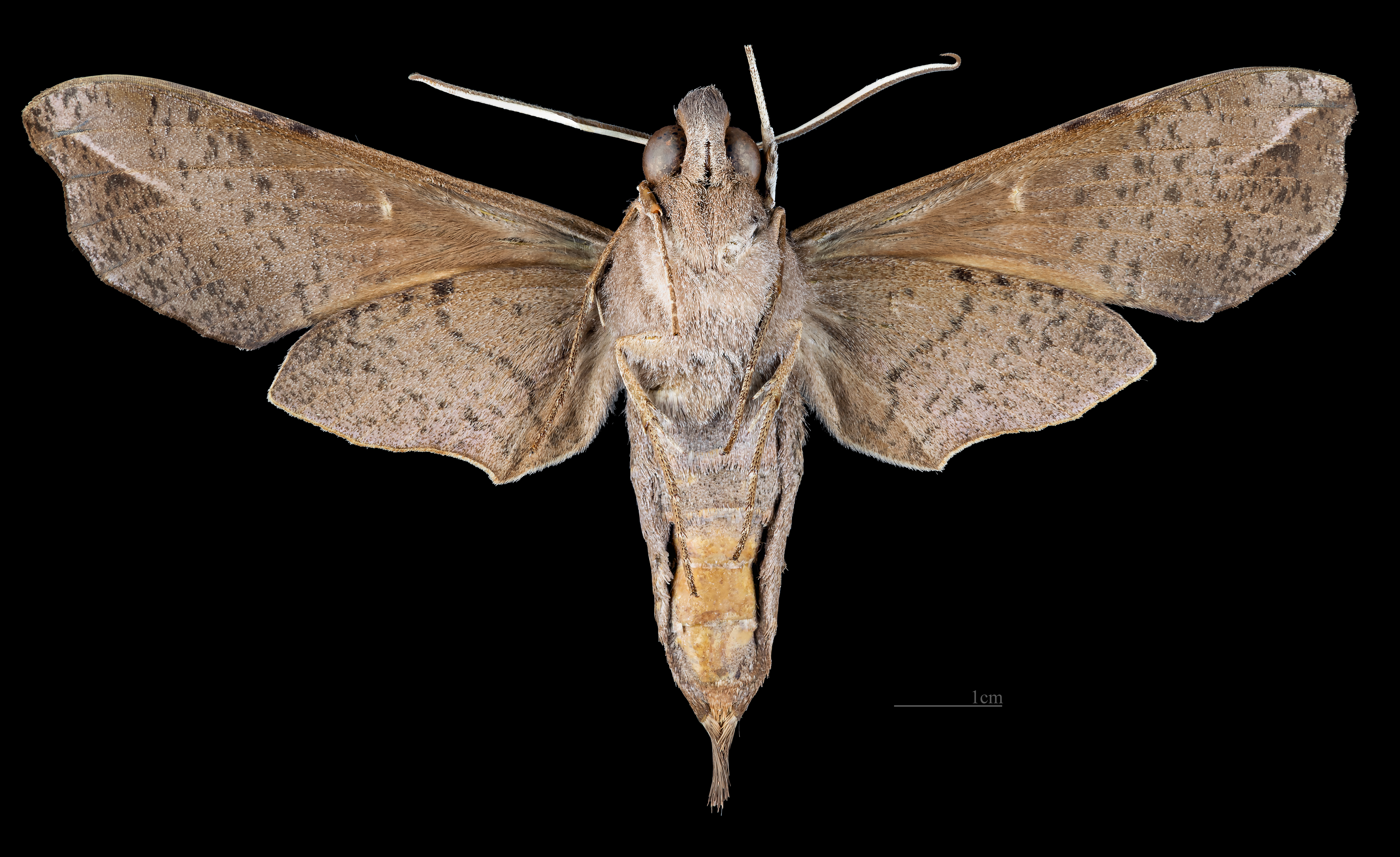
Female ventral

== Biology ==
The larvae probably feed on Apocynaceae species.

== Subspecies ==
- Callionima pan pan
- Callionima pan neivai Oiticica Filho, 1940 (Brazil)
