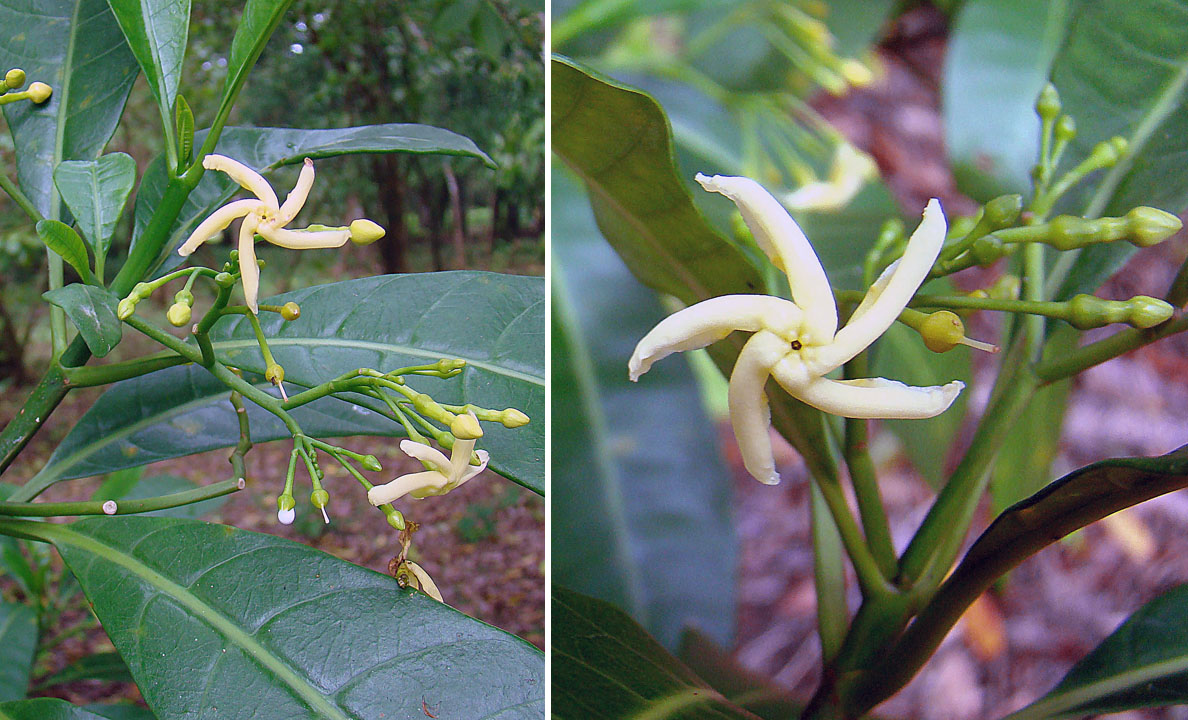
- On Bastimentos Island, Panama

Conservation status
- Least Concern (IUCN 3.1)

Scientific classification
- Kingdom: Plantae
- Clade: Tracheophytes
- Clade: Angiosperms
- Clade: Eudicots
- Clade: Asterids
- Order: Gentianales
- Family: Apocynaceae
- Genus: Tabernaemontana
- Species: T. alba

Binomial name
- Tabernaemontana alba Mill.

Synonyms
- Tabernaemontana amblyblasta S.F.Blake; Tabernaemontana amblyocarpa Urb.; Tabernaemontana chrysocarpa S.F.Blake; Tabernaemontana martensii Peyr.; Tabernaemontana paisavelensis Loes.; Tabernaemontana tuxtlensis Sessé & Moc.; Tabernaemontana umbellata Sessé & Moc.; Tabernaemontana veracrucensis Sessé & Moc.

= Tabernaemontana alba =

Species of plant

Tabernaemontana alba, the white milkwood, is a species of plant in the family Apocynaceae. It is native to Central America, Mexico, Cuba, and Colombia.
