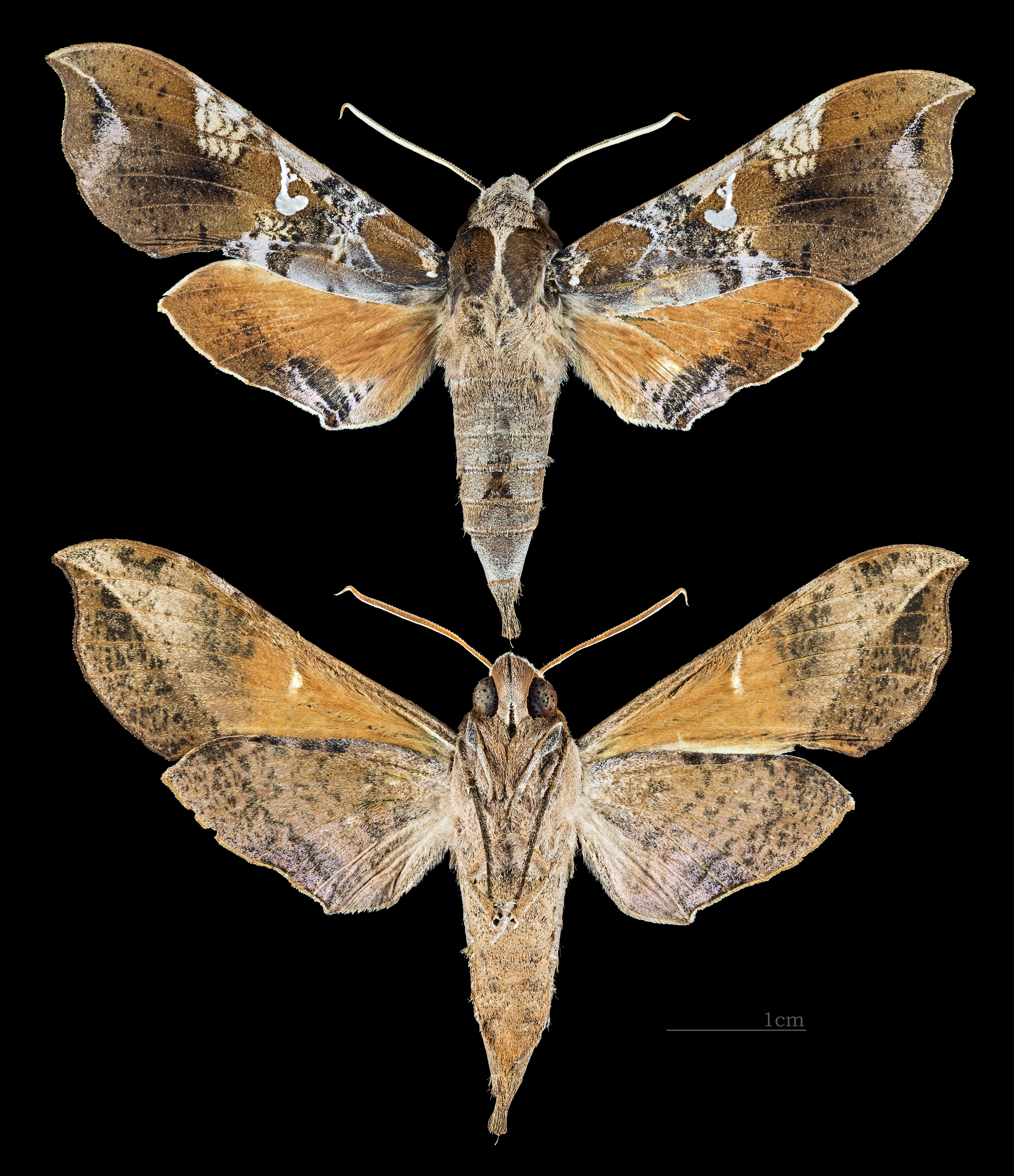

Scientific classification
- Domain: Eukaryota
- Kingdom: Animalia
- Phylum: Arthropoda
- Class: Insecta
- Order: Lepidoptera
- Family: Sphingidae
- Genus: Callionima
- Species: C. falcifera

Binomial name
- Callionima falcifera (Gehlen, 1943)

Synonyms
- Hemeroplanes falcifera Gehlen, 1943; Hemeroplanes jamaicensis Cary, 1951; Hemeroplanes elainae Neidhoefer, 1968; Hemeroplanes falcifera guaycura Cary, 1963

= Callionima falcifera =

Species of moth

Callionima falcifera is a moth of the family Sphingidae first described by Bruno Gehlen in 1943. It is known from Mexico, Belize, Nicaragua, Costa Rica and Jamaica, south through northern South America (north-western and eastern Venezuela).

== Description ==
The wingspan is 68–73 mm.

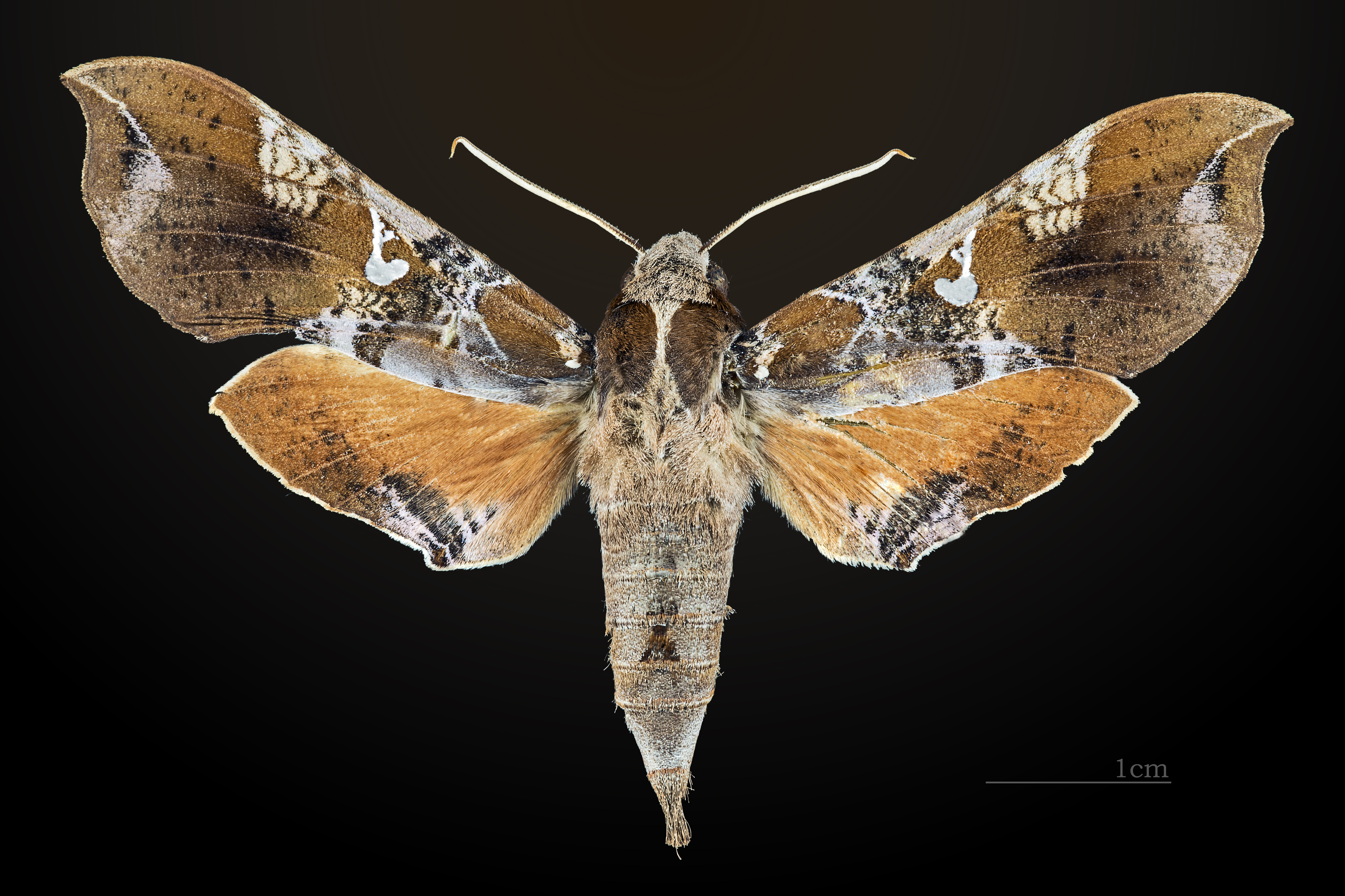
Female

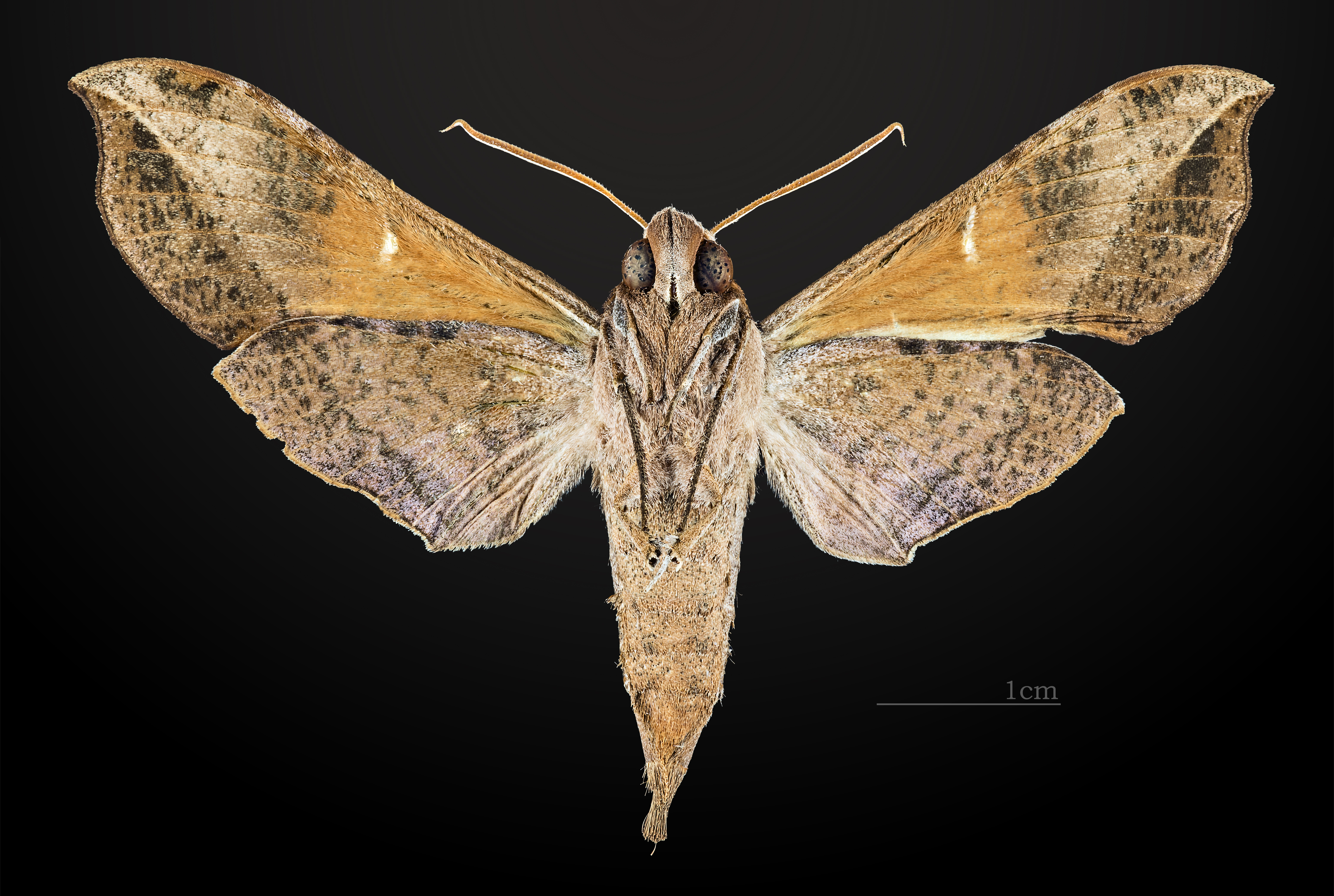
Female underside

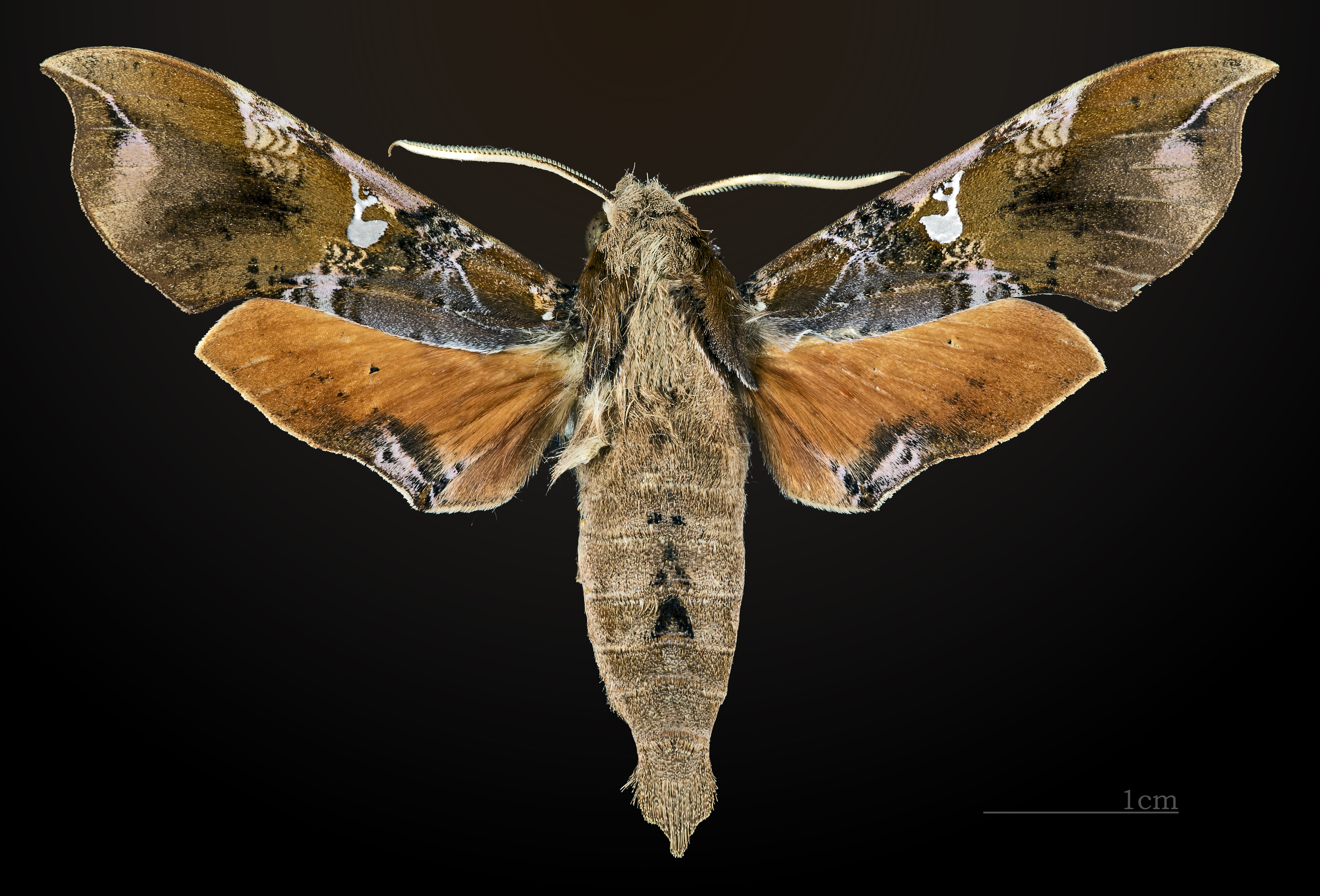
Male

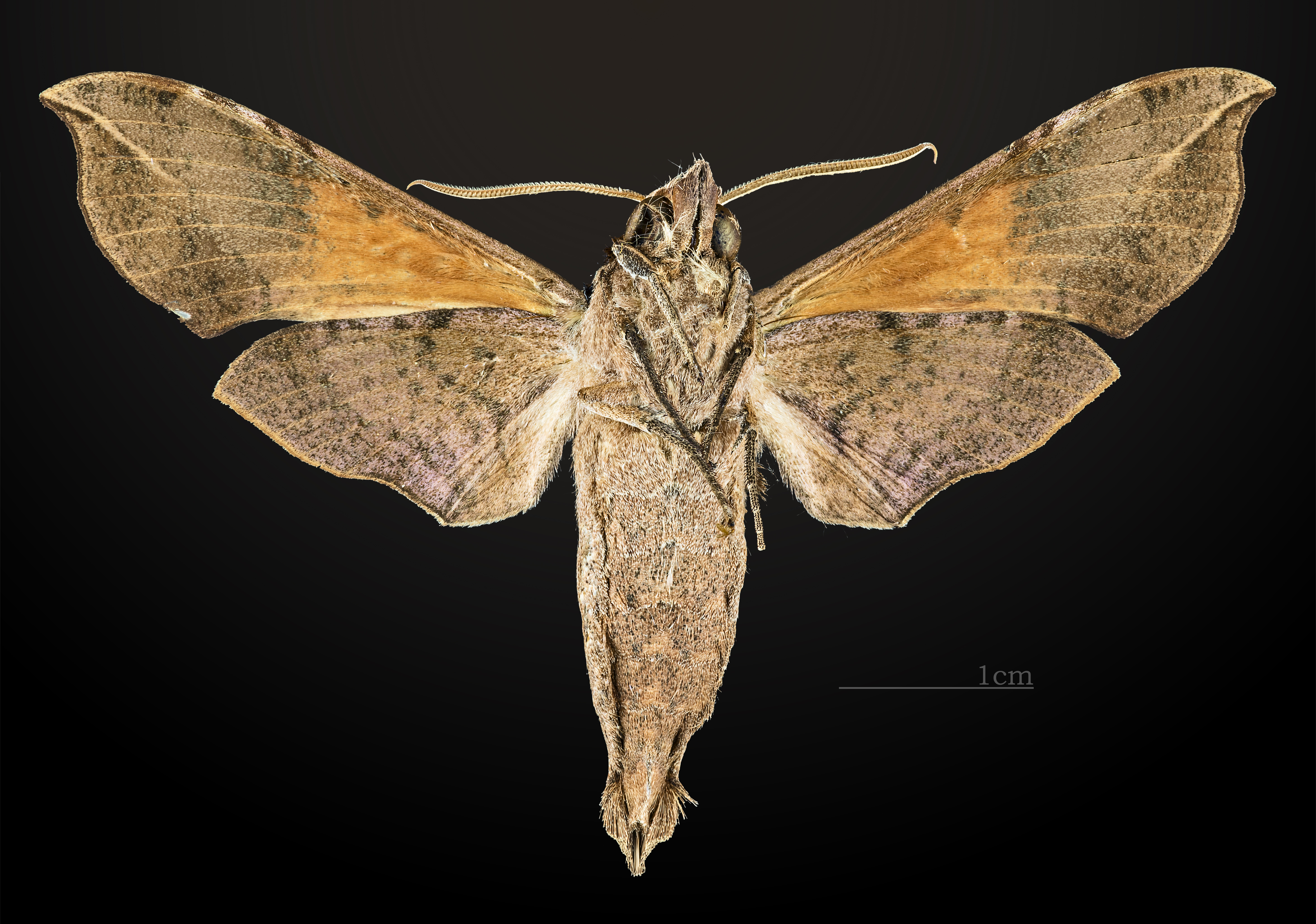
Male underside

== Biology ==
The larvae feed on Stemmadenia obovata and probably other Apocynaceae species.
