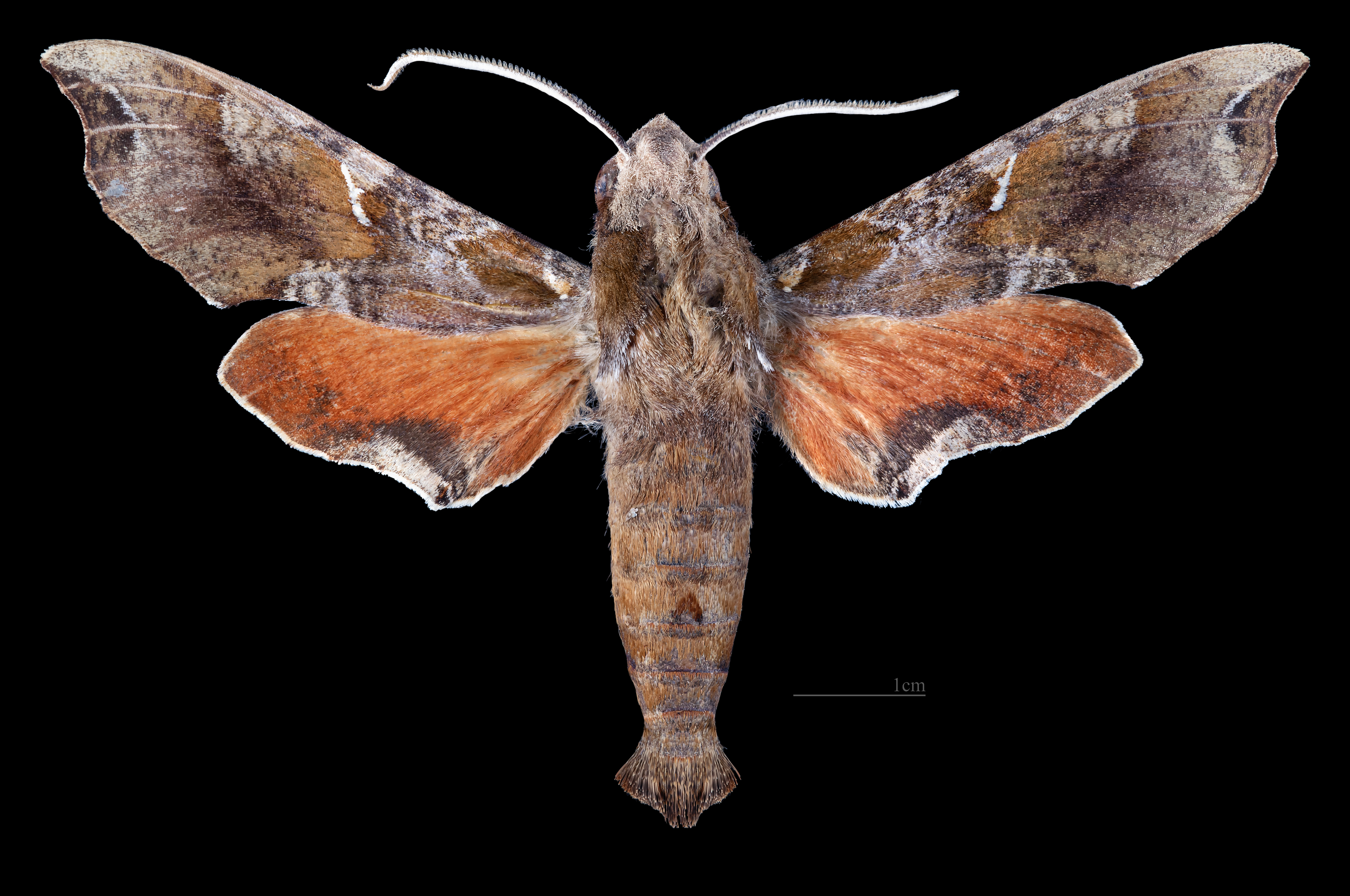
- Male dorsal
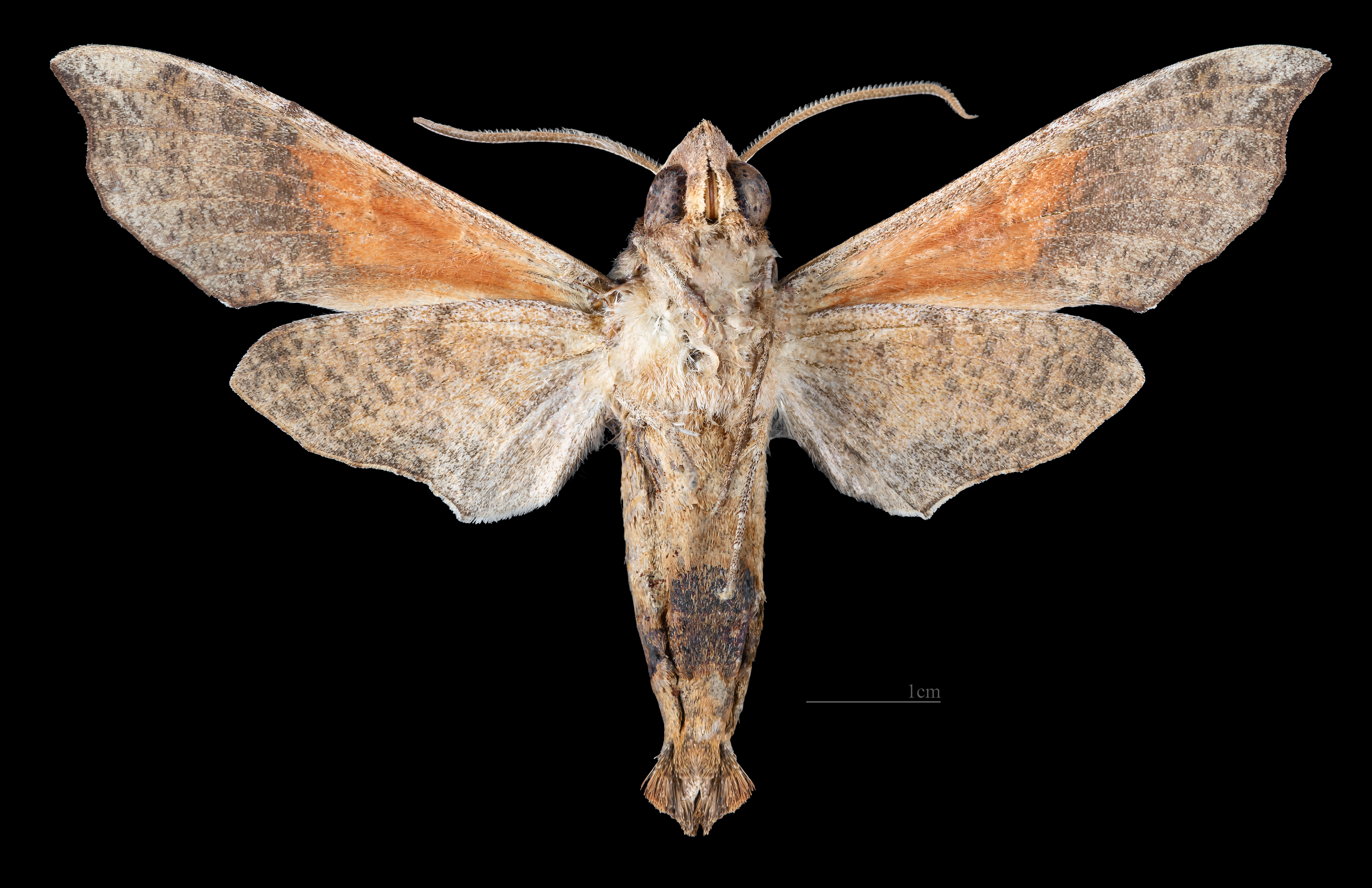
- Male ventral

Scientific classification
- Domain: Eukaryota
- Kingdom: Animalia
- Phylum: Arthropoda
- Class: Insecta
- Order: Lepidoptera
- Family: Sphingidae
- Genus: Callionima
- Species: C. grisescens

Binomial name
- Callionima grisescens (Rothschild, 1894)

Synonyms
- Calliomma grisescens Rothschild, 1894; Callionima grisescens elegans Gehlen, 1935

= Callionima grisescens =

Species of moth

Callionima grisescens is a species of moth in the family Sphingidae. It was originally described by Rothschild as Calliomma grisescens, in 1894.

== Distribution ==
Is known from Argentina, Paraguay, Bolivia and Brazil.

== Biology ==
Adults probably fly in multiple generations. In Bolivia, adults have been found from May to December, from November to December in Argentina.

Adults eclose from pupae formed in flimsy cocoons among leaf litter.

== Description ==
They are dimorphic. The forewing ground colour is pale bluish-grey or orange-brown, the latter somewhat resembling small specimens of Callionima calliomenae. The apex of the forewing is pointed. The outer margin is not dentate or with only a vestigial teeth which is slightly concave below apex. The forewing upperside has a black (often indistinct) median band crossing the wing just basal to the narrow transversely oriented silver spots. The hindwing upperside is very similar to Callionima parce, the black and white anal patch is heavy, the space around it grey.

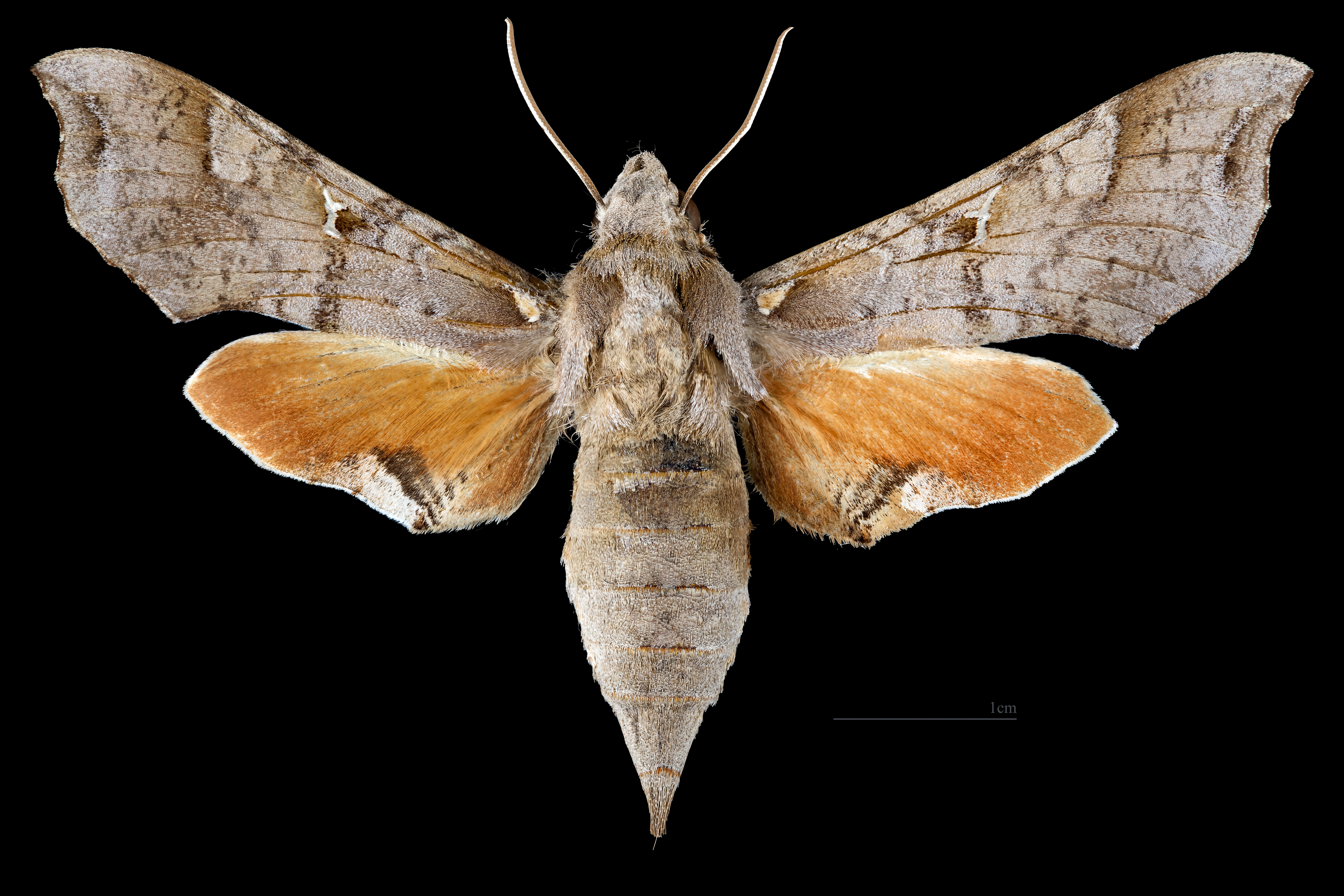
Female dorsal

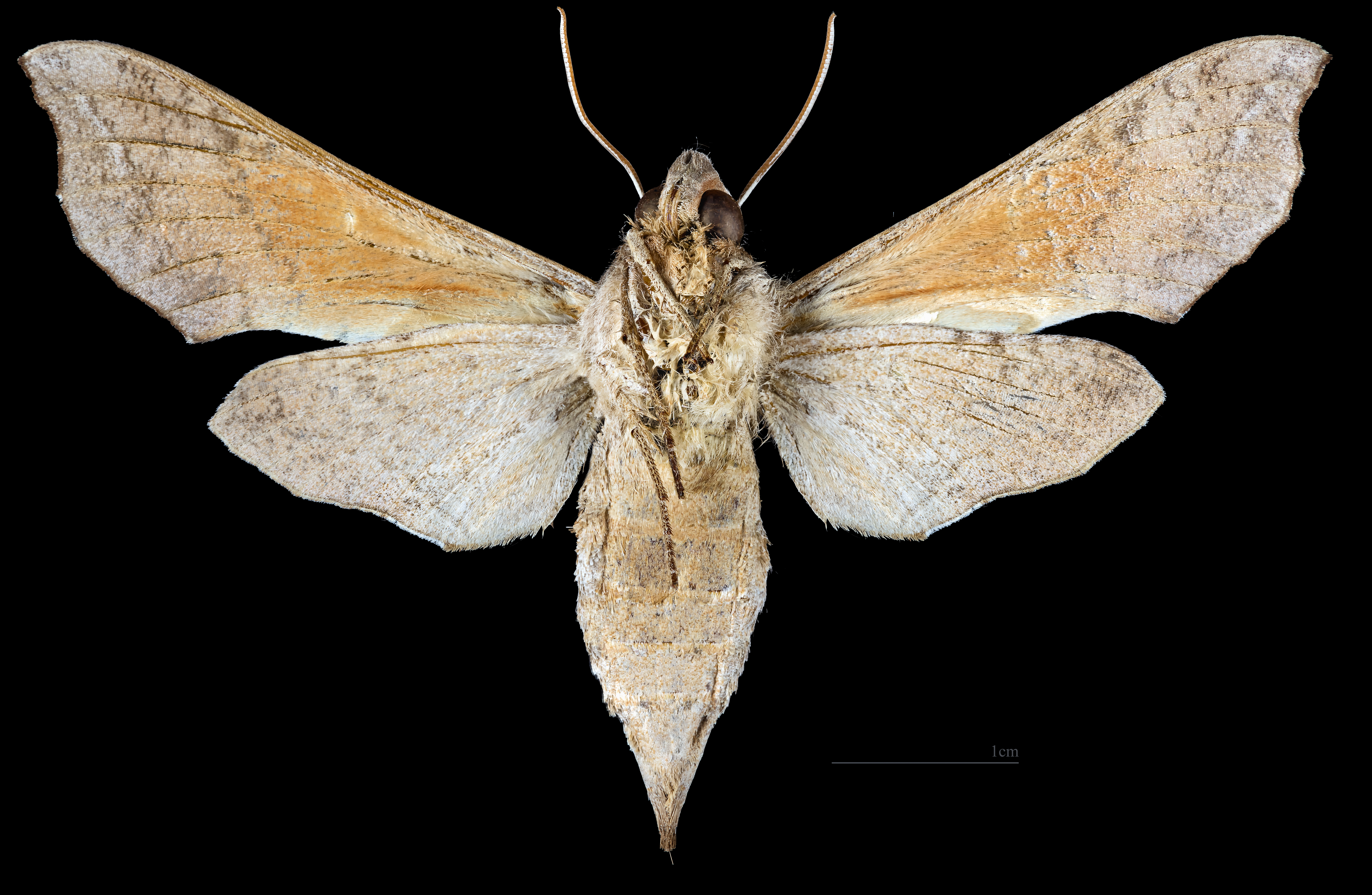
Female ventral
