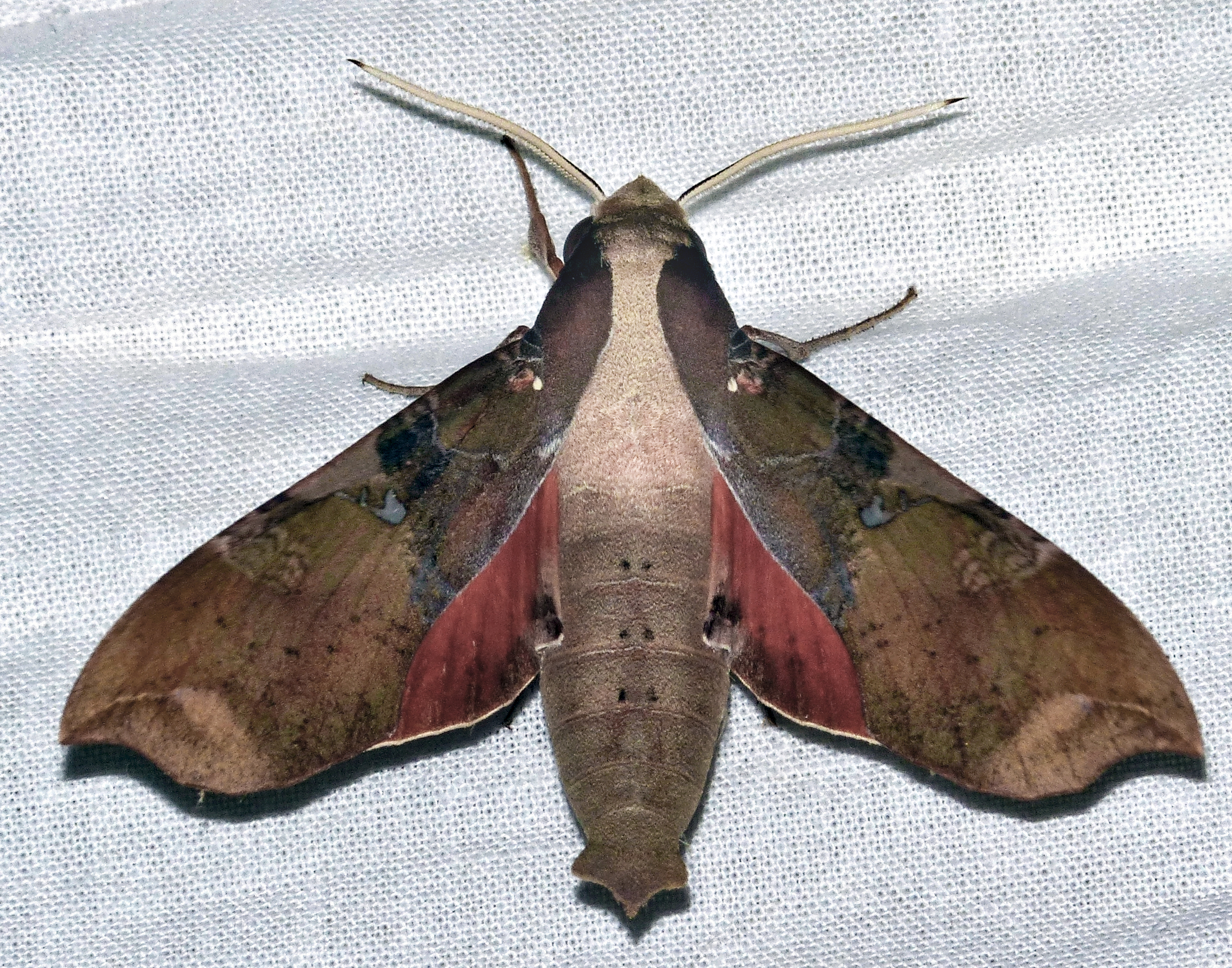
- Dorsal view

Scientific classification
- Kingdom: Animalia
- Phylum: Arthropoda
- Class: Insecta
- Order: Lepidoptera
- Family: Sphingidae
- Genus: Callionima
- Species: C. parce

Binomial name
- Callionima parce (Fabricius, 1775)

Synonyms
- Sphinx parce Fabricius, 1775; Sphinx licastus Stoll, 1781; Sphinx galianna Burmeister, 1855; Hemeroplanes parthenope Zikán, 1935

= Callionima parce =

Parce sphinx moth

Species of moth

Callionima parce, the parce sphinx moth, is a species of moth in the family Sphingidae.It was originally described by Johan Christian Fabricius in 1775.

== Distribution ==
Is known from Argentina, Venezuela, Suriname, French Guiana, Bolivia, Brazil, Peru to Belize, Guatemala, Nicaragua, Costa Rica, Panama and Mexico to southern Florida, southern Texas, southern Arizona and southern California.

== Description ==
The wingspan is 67–80 mm.

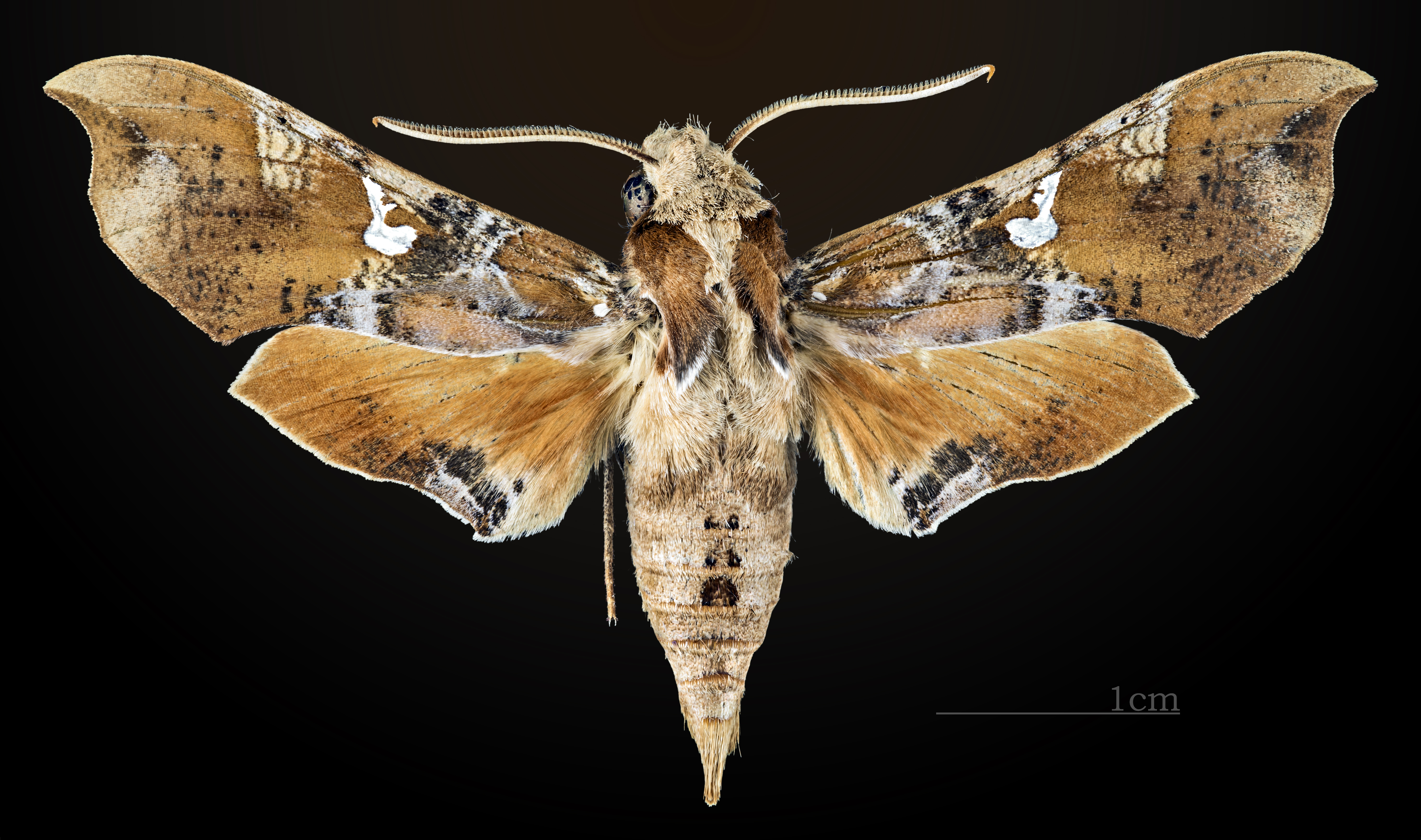
Male dorsal

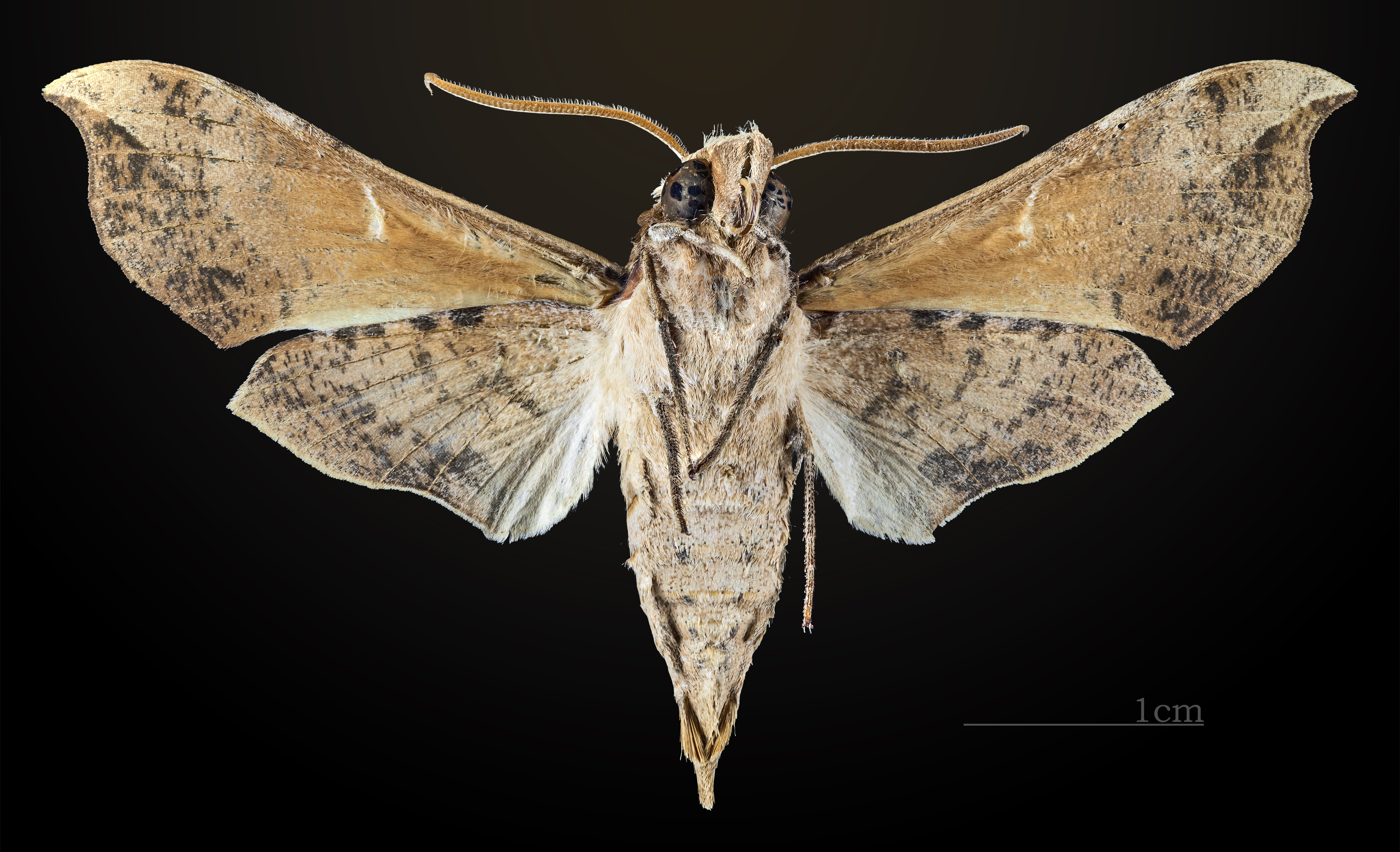
Male ventral

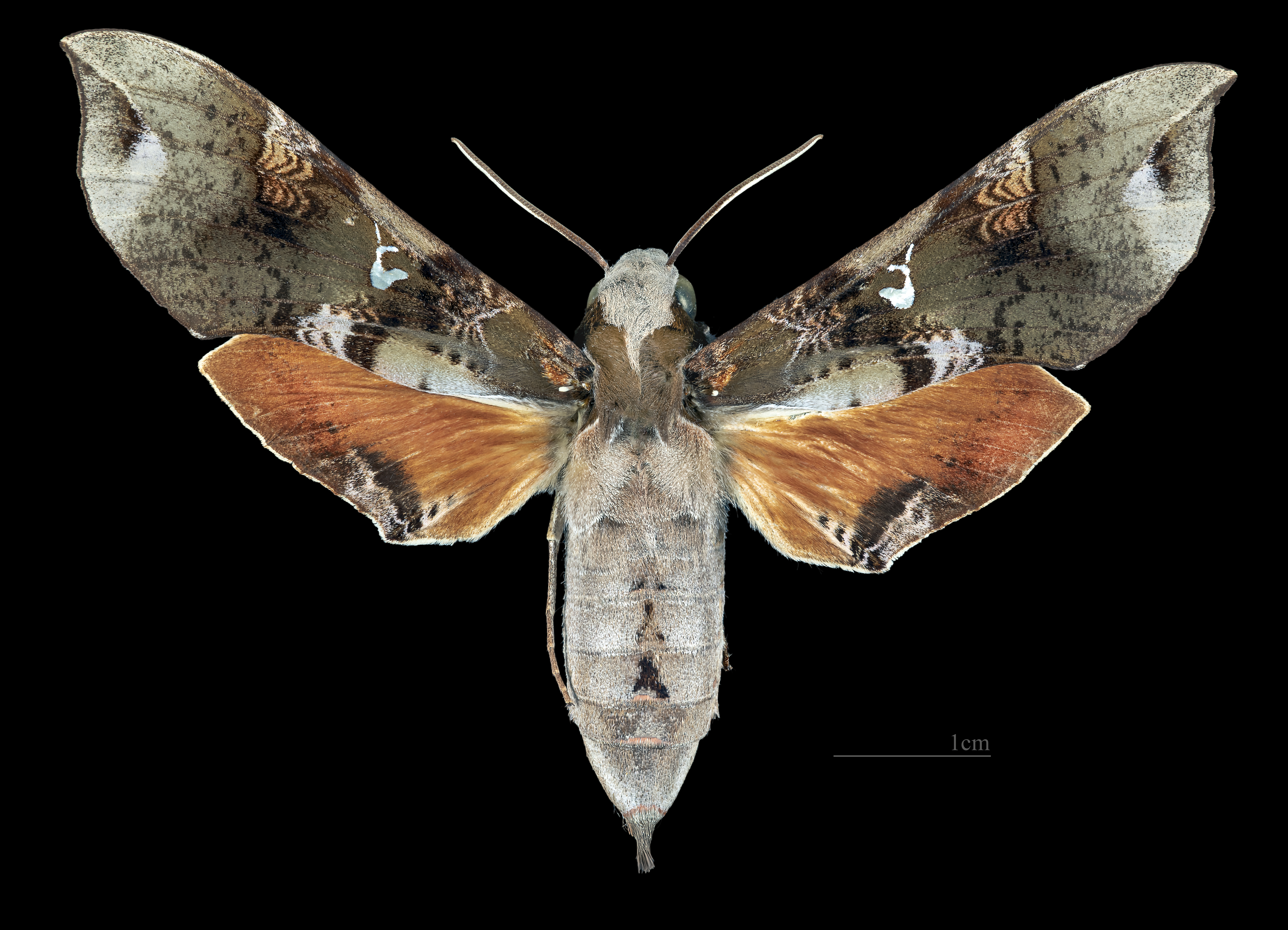
Female dorsal

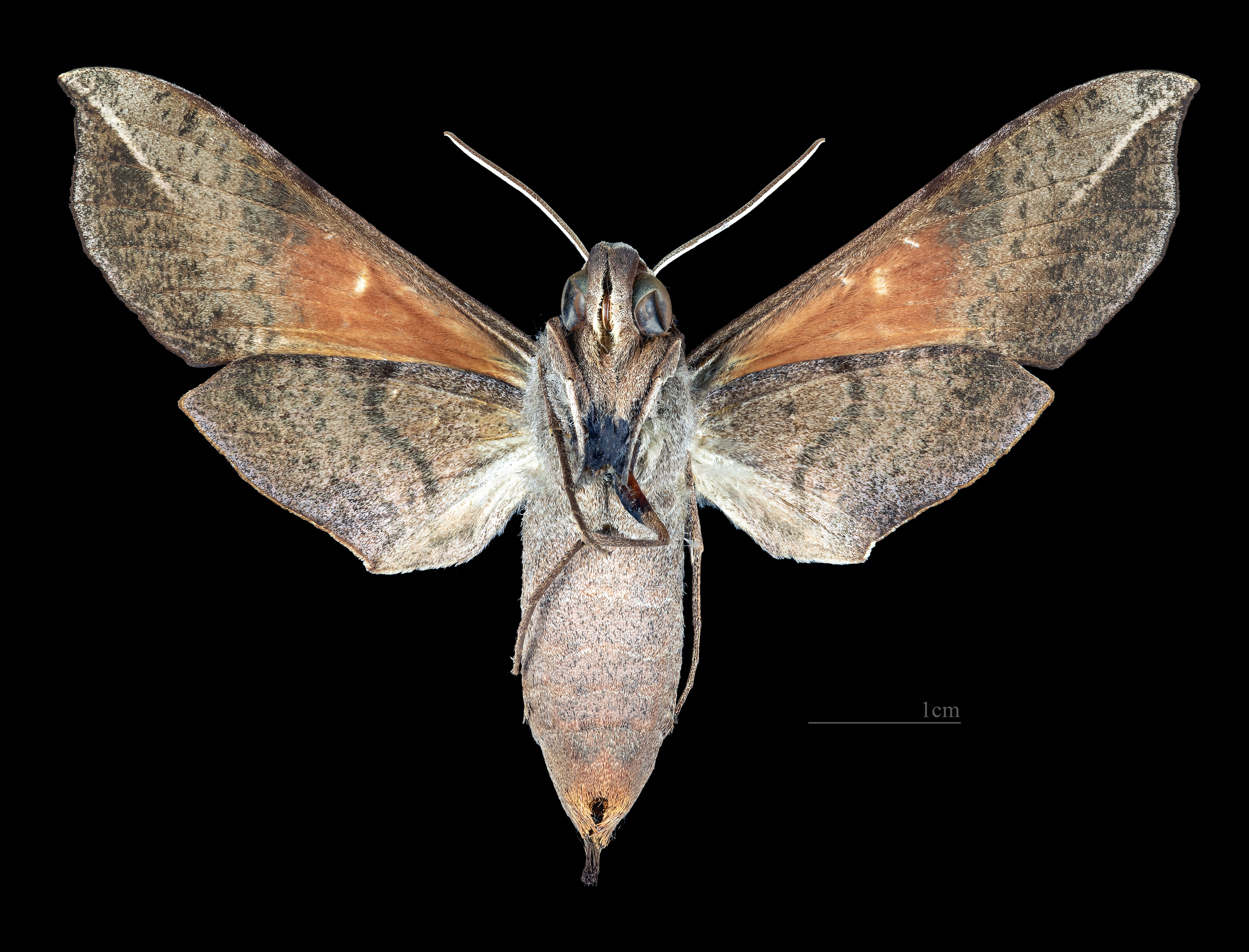
Female vetnral

== Biology ==
Adults are on wing year round in Costa Rica. In the United States adults are on wing from April to September in Florida, Texas, Arizona and southern California.

The larvae feed on Stemmadenia obovata and probably other Apocynaceae species.
