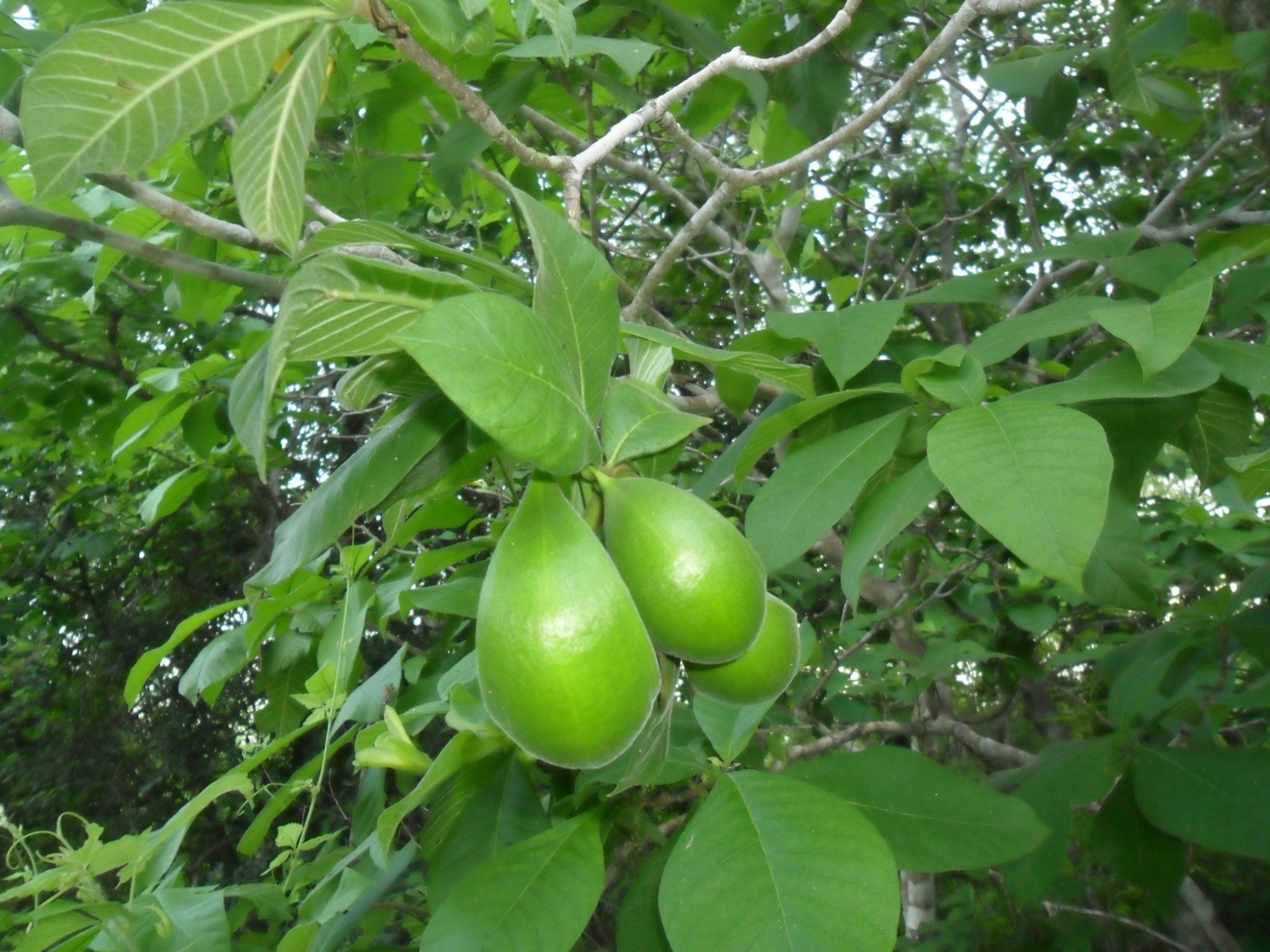
- Fructification (in Veracruz, Mexico)

Conservation status
- Least Concern (IUCN 3.1)

Scientific classification
- Kingdom: Plantae
- Clade: Tracheophytes
- Clade: Angiosperms
- Clade: Eudicots
- Clade: Asterids
- Order: Gentianales
- Family: Apocynaceae
- Genus: Tabernaemontana
- Species: T. glabra

Binomial name
- Tabernaemontana glabra (Benth.) A.O.Simões & M.E.Endress

Synonyms
- Stemmadenia glabra Benth.; Bignonia obovata Hook. & Arn. 1841, illegitimate homonym, not (Kunth) Spreng. 1825 nor Vell. 1829; Stemmadenia mollis Benth.; Stemmadenia pubescens Benth.; Stemmadenia obovata K.Schum.; Stemmadenia calycina Brandegee; Stemmadenia obovata var. mollis (Benth.) Woodson; Tabernaemontana odontadeniiflora A.O.Simões & M.E.Endress

= Tabernaemontana glabra =

Species of plant

Tabernaemontana glabra is an evergreen tree from the family Apocynaceae, native to Mexico, Central America, and northwestern South America (Colombia, Peru, Ecuador, Bolivia). It is similar to Tabernaemontana donnell-smithii, except that its leaves and flowers are larger and its fruit is smaller.
