= Callambulyx sichangensis =

Scientific classification
- Domain: Eukaryota
- Kingdom: Animalia
- Phylum: Arthropoda
- Class: Insecta
- Order: Lepidoptera
- Family: Sphingidae
- Genus: Callambulyx
- Species: C. sichangensis

Binomial name
- Callambulyx sichangensis Chu & Wang, 1980

Synonyms
- Callambulyx sichangenata

Species of moth

Callambulyx sichangensis is a species of moth of the family Sphingidae. It is known from China.
