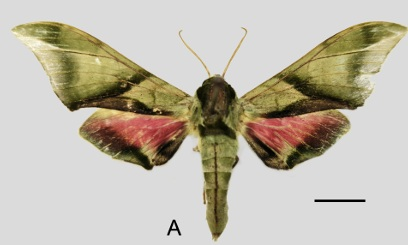

Scientific classification
- Kingdom: Animalia
- Phylum: Arthropoda
- Clade: Pancrustacea
- Class: Insecta
- Order: Lepidoptera
- Family: Sphingidae
- Genus: Callambulyx
- Species: C. diehli

Binomial name
- Callambulyx diehli Brechlin & Kitching, 2012

= Callambulyx diehli =

Species of moth

Callambulyx diehli is a species of moth of the family Sphingidae first described by Arthur Gardiner Butler in 1881.

== Distribution ==
It is known from China (Yunnan, Guangxi, Guizhou, Hainan, Fujian, Zhejiang), Thailand, Laos, Vietnam, Cambodia, Myanmar, Malaysia and Indonesia.

== Description ==
Adults have green forewings with olive lines, the middle area dark greenish and with a black-purple patch towards the tornus.
