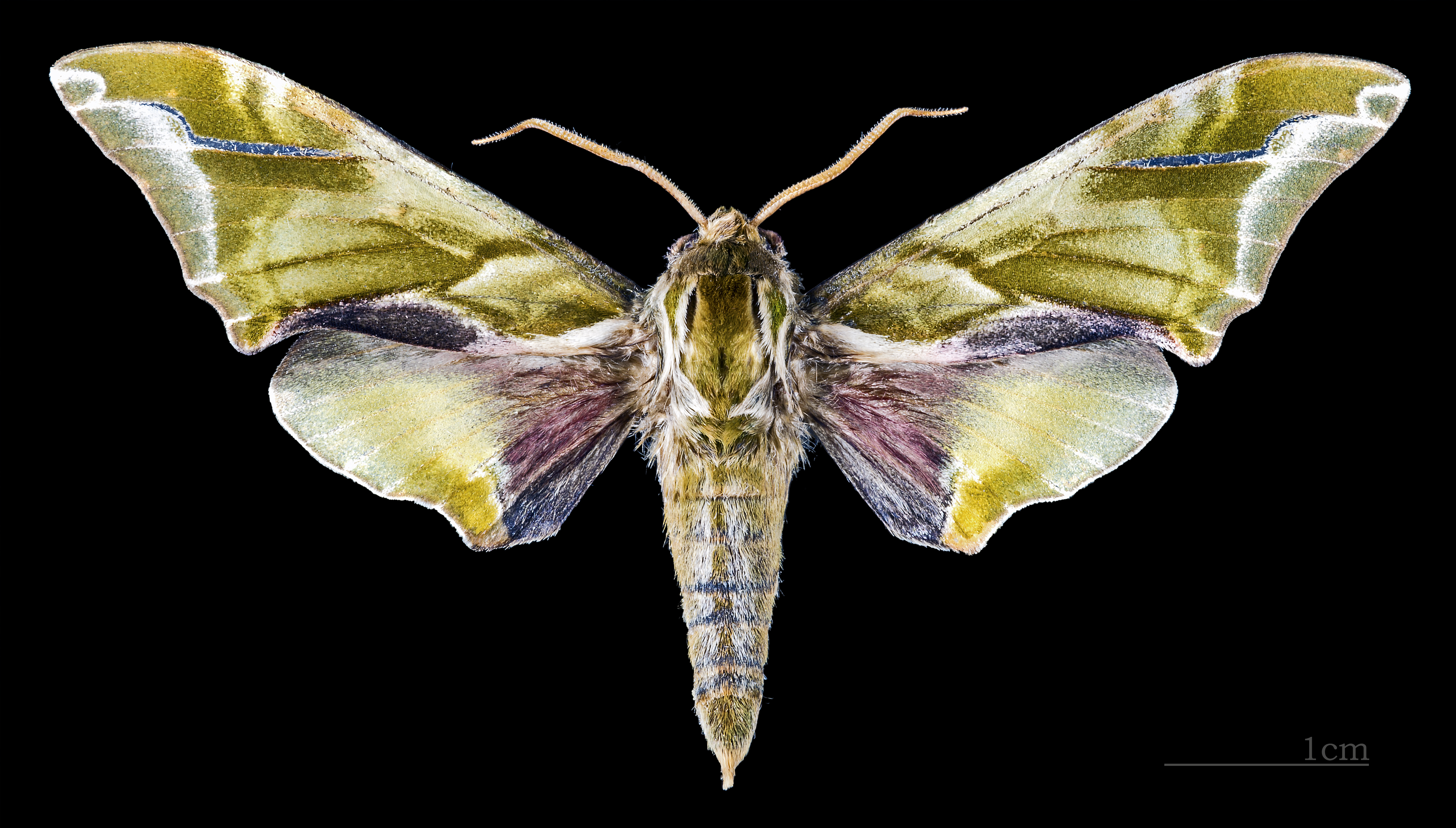
- Dorsal MHNT Paratype
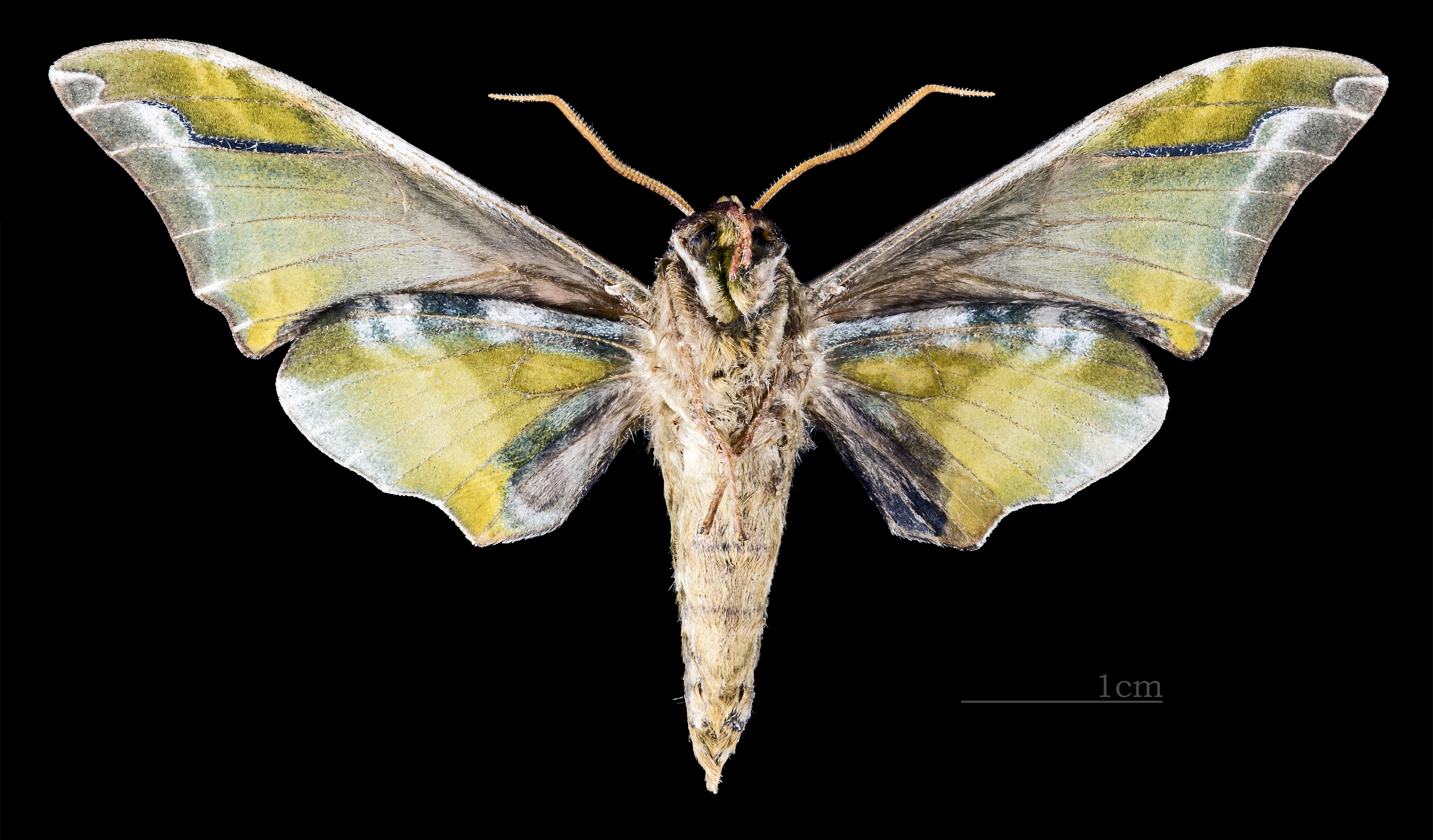
- Ventral MHNT Paratype

Scientific classification
- Kingdom: Animalia
- Phylum: Arthropoda
- Class: Insecta
- Order: Lepidoptera
- Family: Sphingidae
- Genus: Callambulyx
- Species: C. sinjaevi

Binomial name
- Callambulyx sinjaevi Brechlin, 2000

= Callambulyx sinjaevi =

Species of moth

Callambulyx sinjaevi is a species of moth of the family Sphingidae. It is known from Shaanxi in China.
