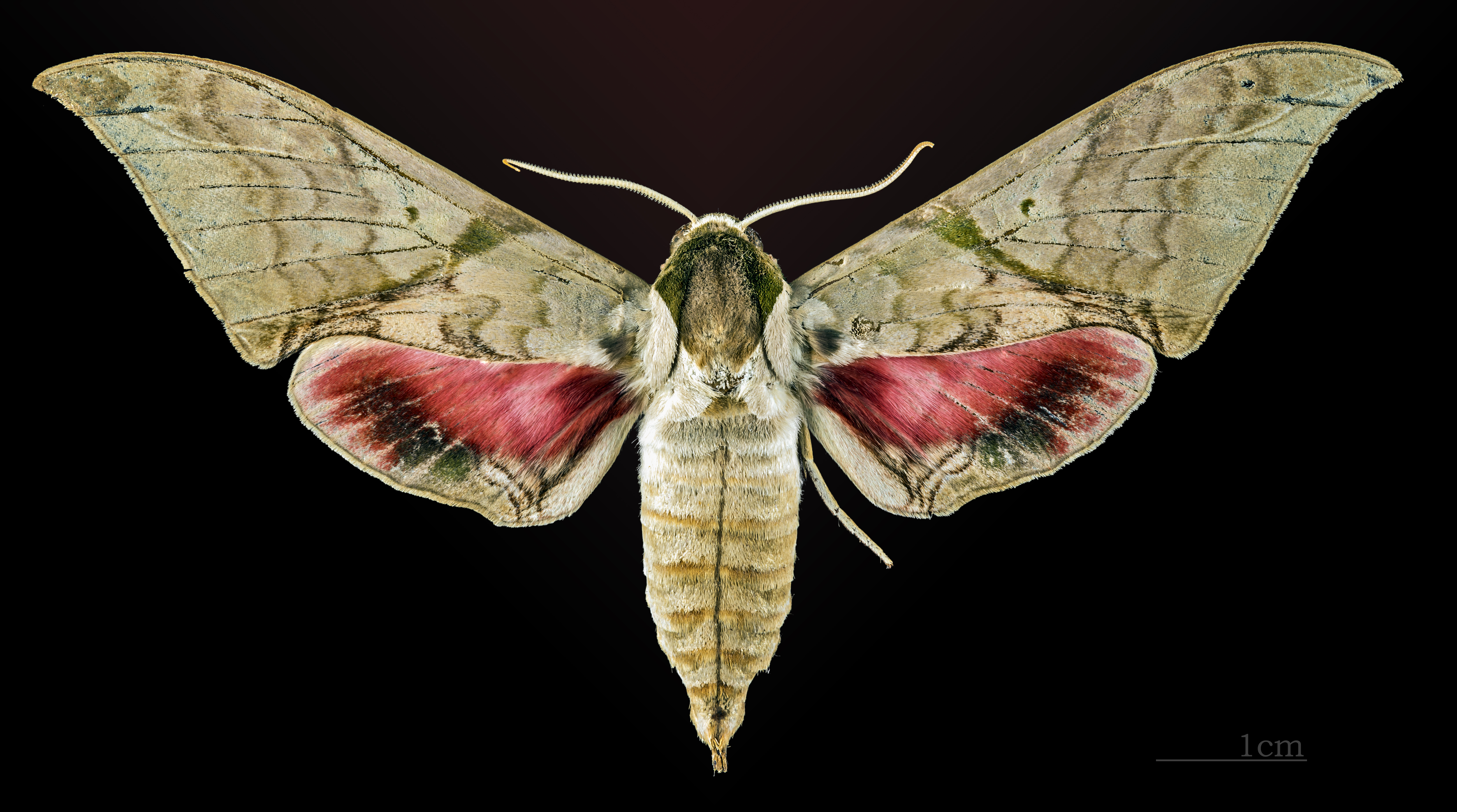
- Callambulyx rubricosa

Scientific classification
- Domain: Eukaryota
- Kingdom: Animalia
- Phylum: Arthropoda
- Class: Insecta
- Order: Lepidoptera
- Family: Sphingidae
- Tribe: Smerinthini
- Genus: Callambulyx; Rothschild & Jordan, 1903

= Callambulyx =

Genus of moths

Callambulyx is a genus of moths in the family Sphingidae first described by Walter Rothschild and Karl Jordan in 1903.

== Species ==
- Callambulyx amanda Rothschild & Jordan 1903
- Callambulyx diehli Brechlin & Kitching, 2012
- Callambulyx junonia (Butler 1881)
- Callambulyx kitchingi Cadiou 1996
- Callambulyx poecilus (Rothschild 1898)
- Callambulyx rubricosa (Walker 1856)
  - Callambulyx rubricosa piepersi (Snellen, 1880)
- Callambulyx schintlmeisteri Brechlin 1997
- Callambulyx sichangensis Chu & Wang, 1980
- Callambulyx sinjaevi Brechlin, 2000
- Callambulyx tatarinovii (Bremer & Grey 1853)
  - Callambulyx tatarinovii formosana Clark, 1935
  - Callambulyx tatarinovii gabyae Bryk, 1946

== Gallery ==
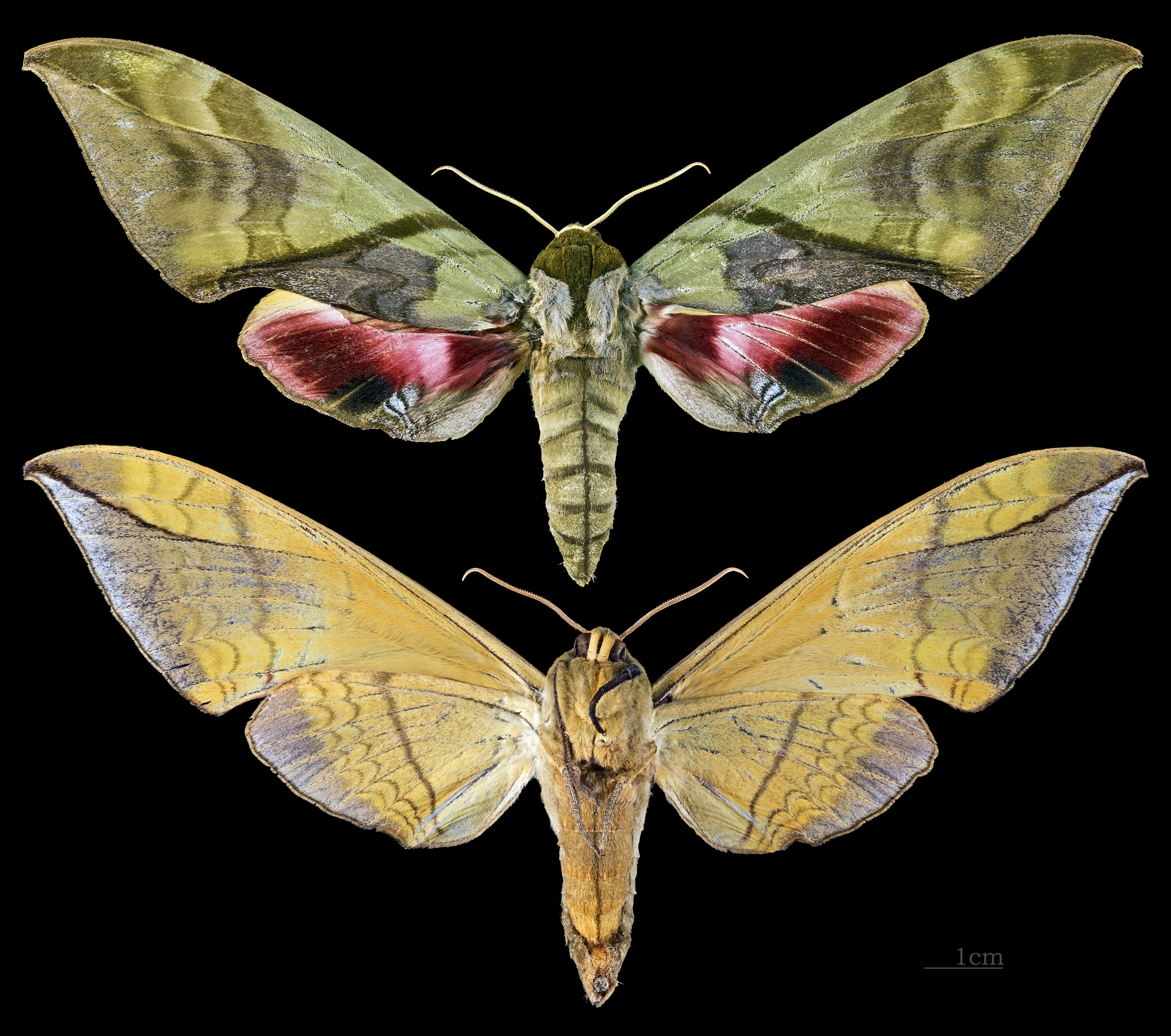
Callambulyx amanda

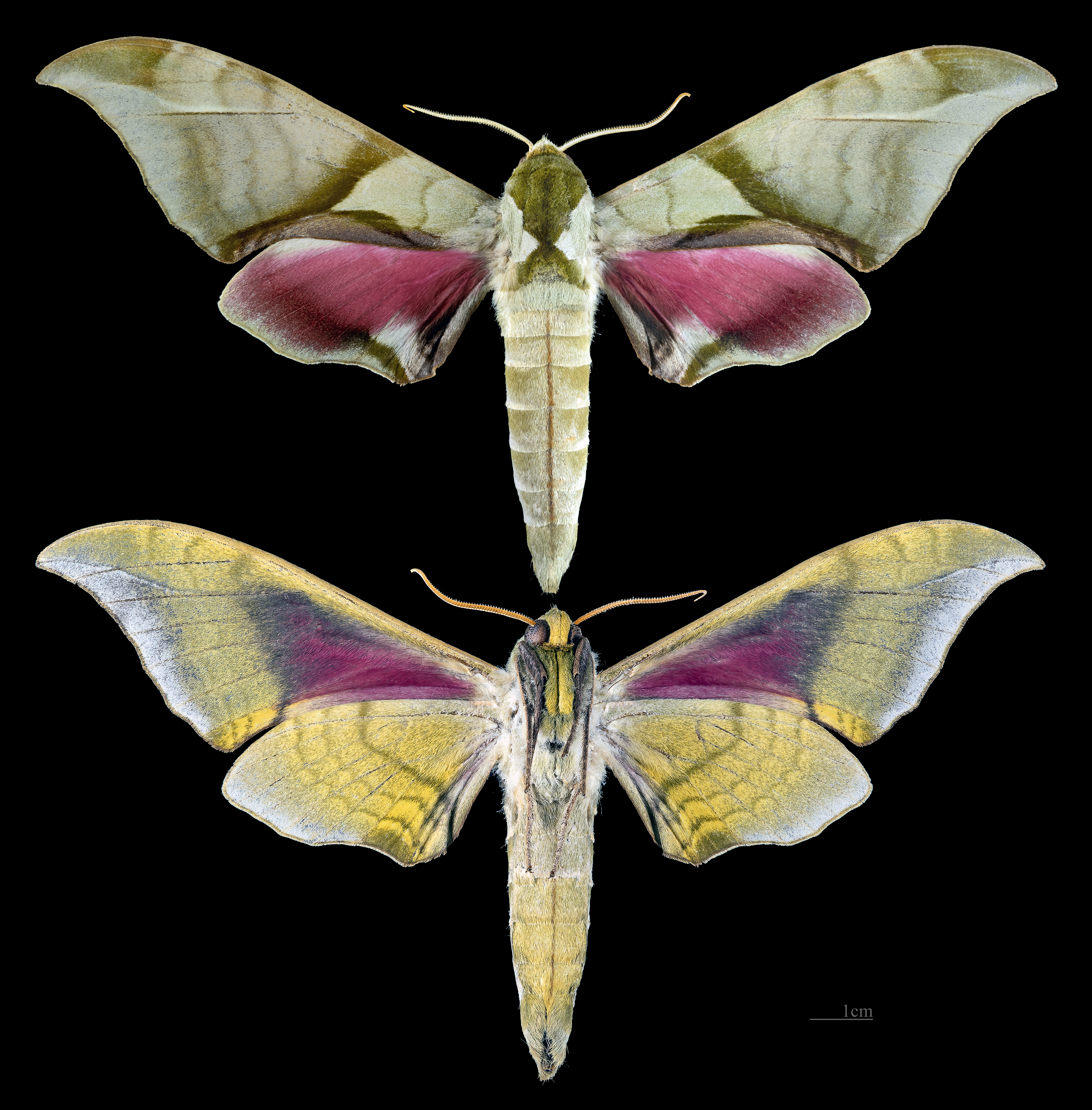
Callambulyx poecilus

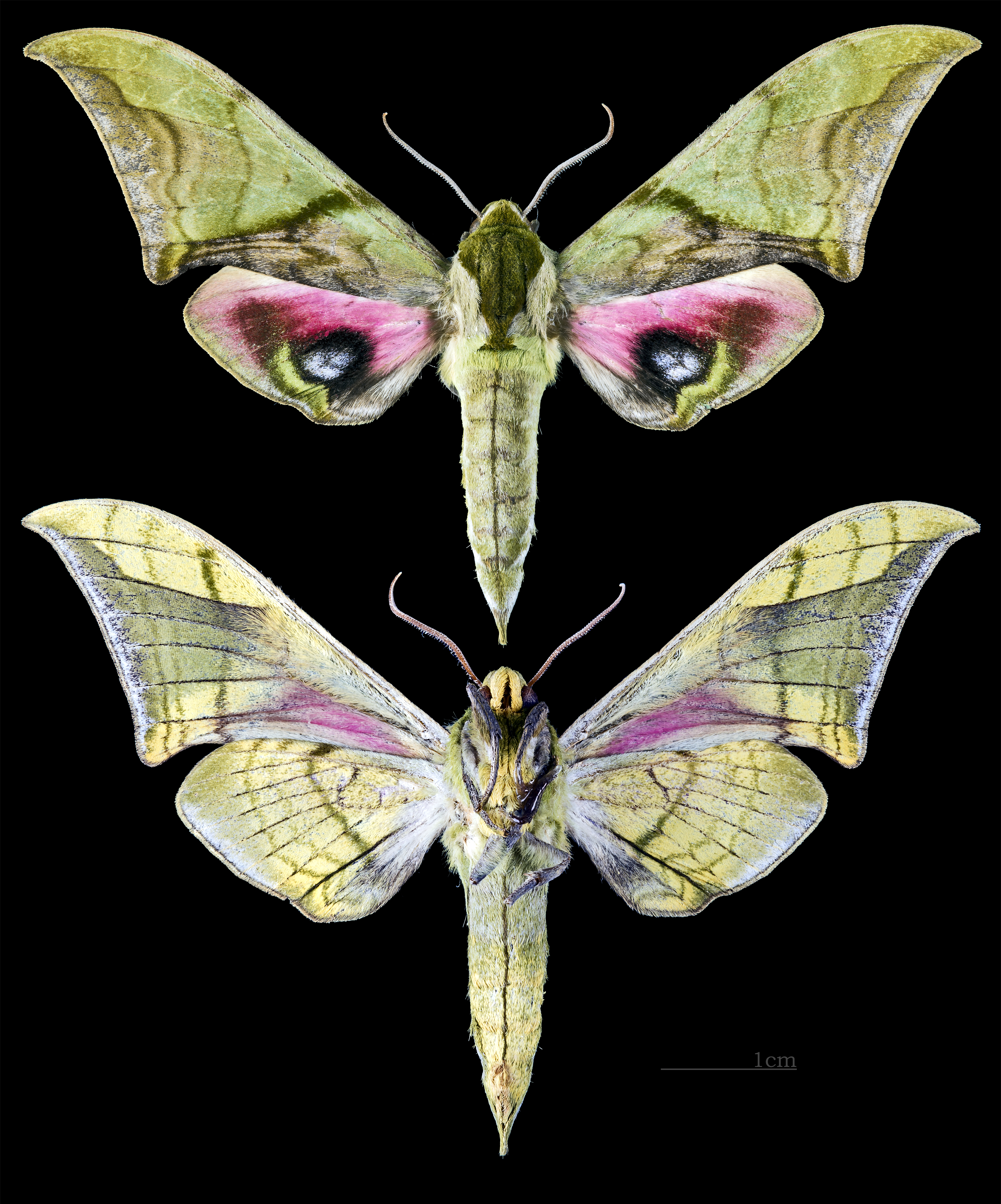
Callambulyx junonia

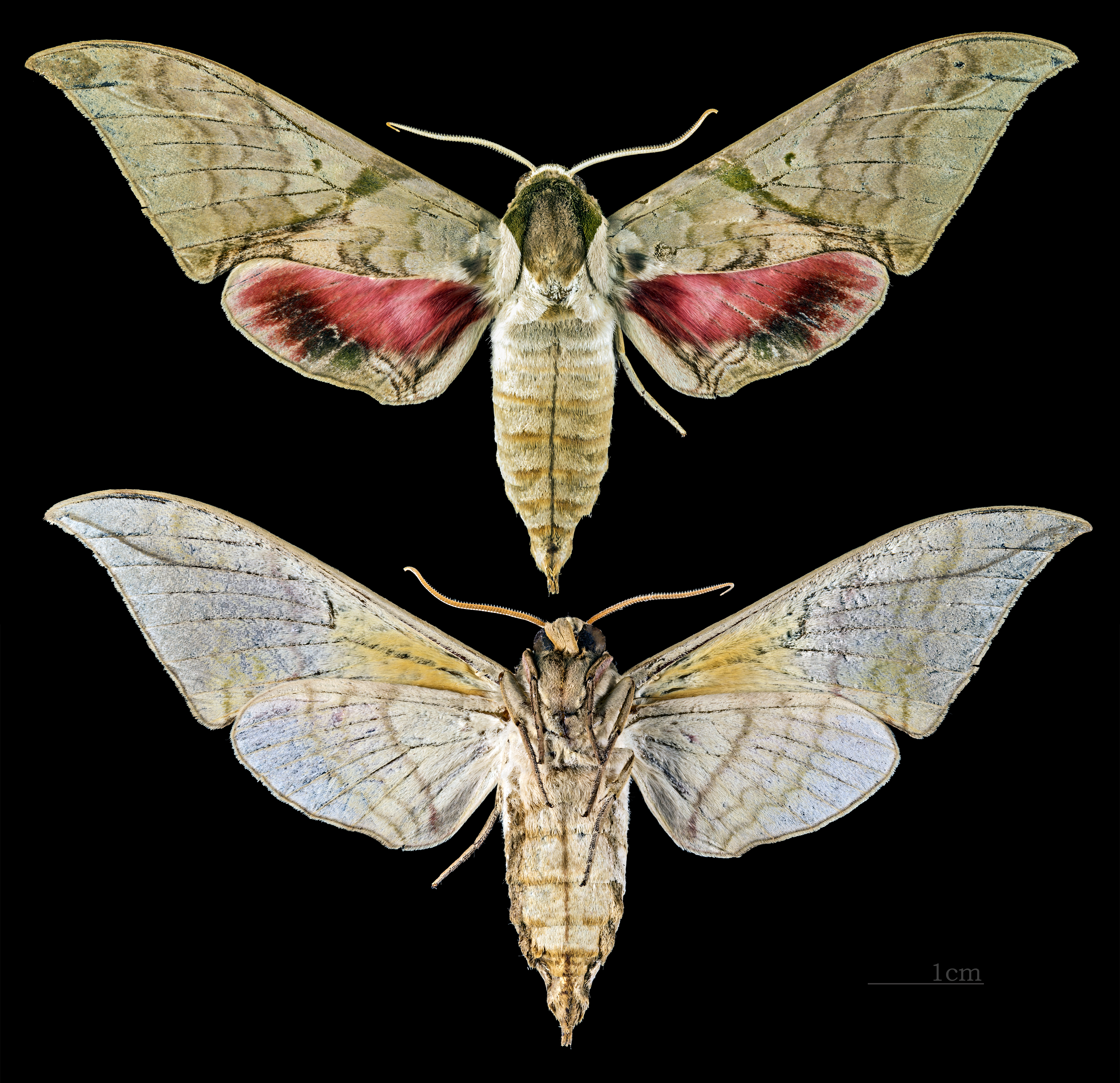
Callambulyx rubricosa piepersi

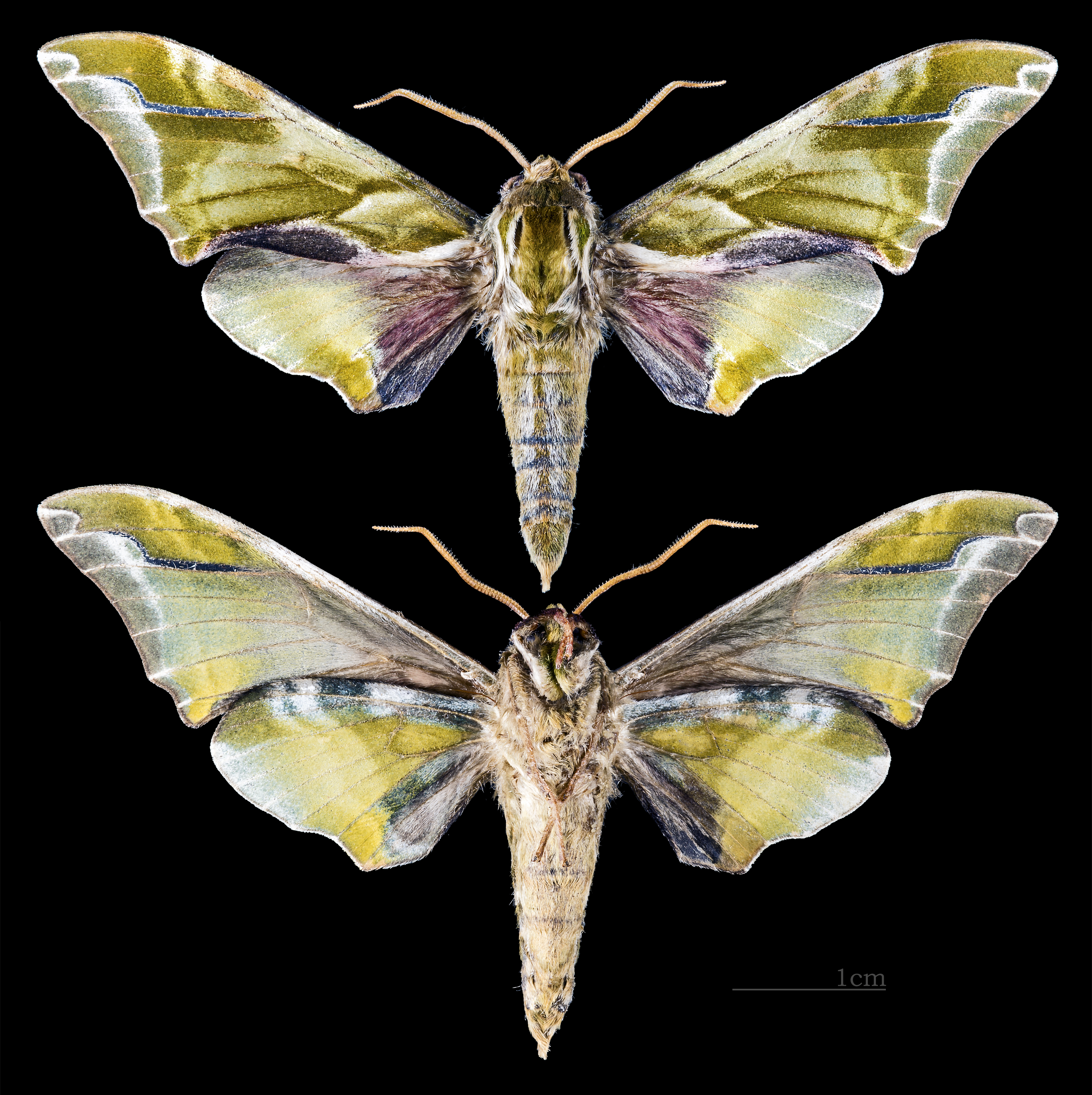
Callambulyx sinjaevi

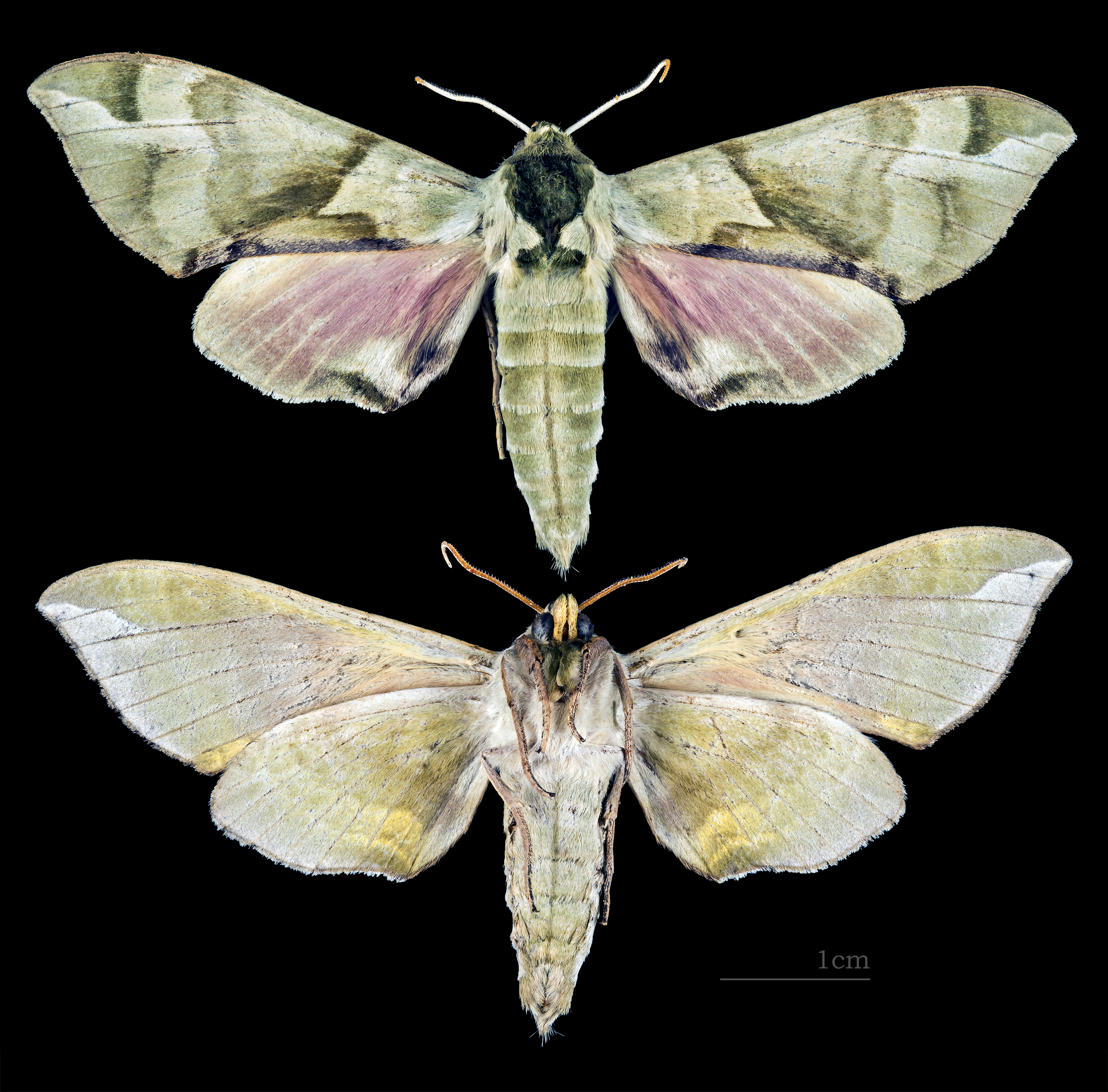
Callambulyx tatarinovii
