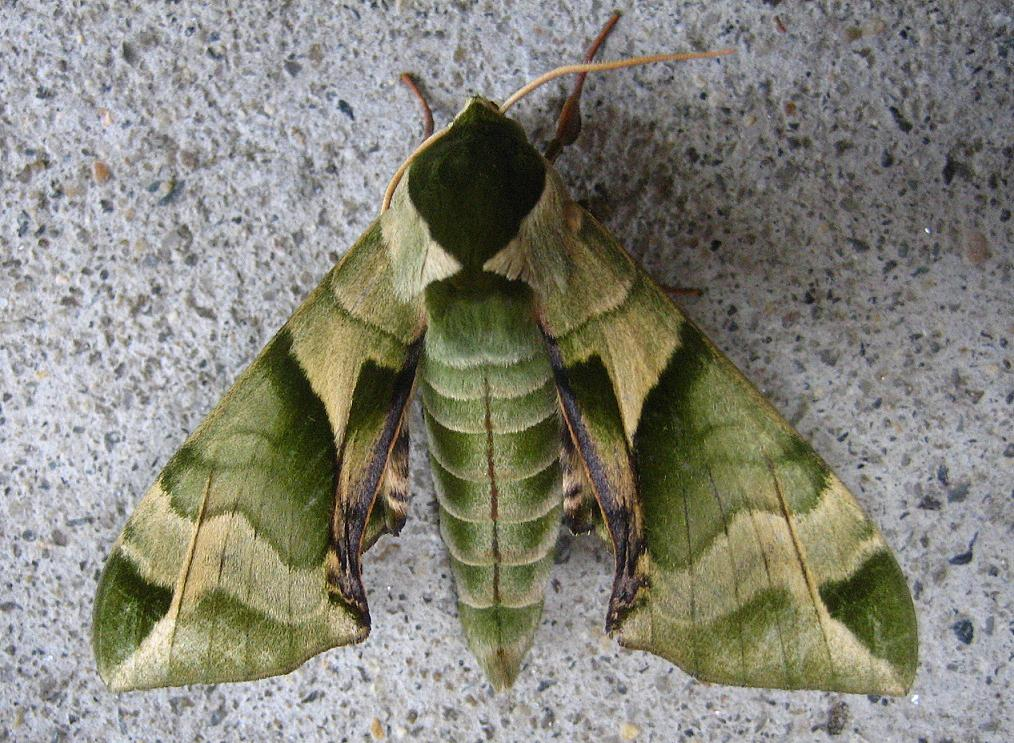

Scientific classification
- Domain: Eukaryota
- Kingdom: Animalia
- Phylum: Arthropoda
- Class: Insecta
- Order: Lepidoptera
- Family: Sphingidae
- Genus: Callambulyx
- Species: C. tatarinovii

Binomial name
- Callambulyx tatarinovii (Bremer & Grey, 1853)

Synonyms
- Smerinthus tatarinovii Bremer & Grey, 1853; Smerinthus eversmanni Eversmann, 1854; Callambulyx tatarinovii coreana Gehlen, 1941; Callambulyx tatarinovii versicolor Gehlen, 1941; Smerinthus tatarinovii brunnea Staudinger, 1892; Callambulyx tatarinovii formosana Okano, 1958; Callambulyx tatarinovii japonica Eichler, 1965; Smerinthus tatarinovii flavina (Austaut, 1912)

= Callambulyx tatarinovii =

Species of moth

Callambulyx tatarinovii, or unmonsuzume (ウンモンスズメ) in Japanese, is a moth of the family Sphingidae. The species was first described by Otto Vasilievich Bremer and William (Wasilii) Grey in 1853.

== Distribution ==
It is found from northern Xinjiang across northern China, Mongolia, southern Siberia to the Russian Far East and Japan, and then south through Korea and central China to eastern Tibet. It is also found in Taiwan.

== Description ==
The wingspan is 56–82 millimetres (2.2–3.2 in). It is very similar to Smerinthus kindermannii.

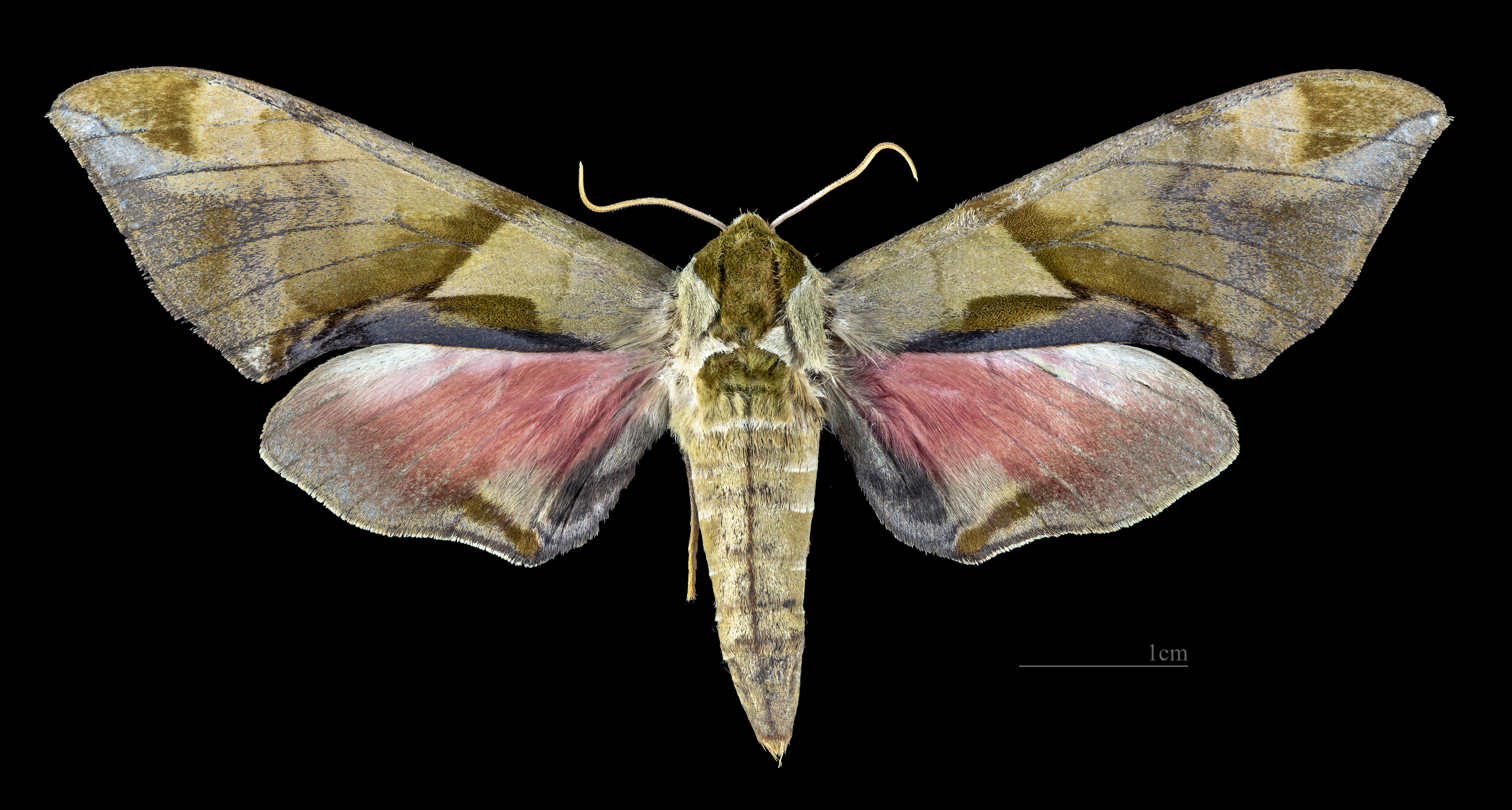
Female C. t. tatarinovii

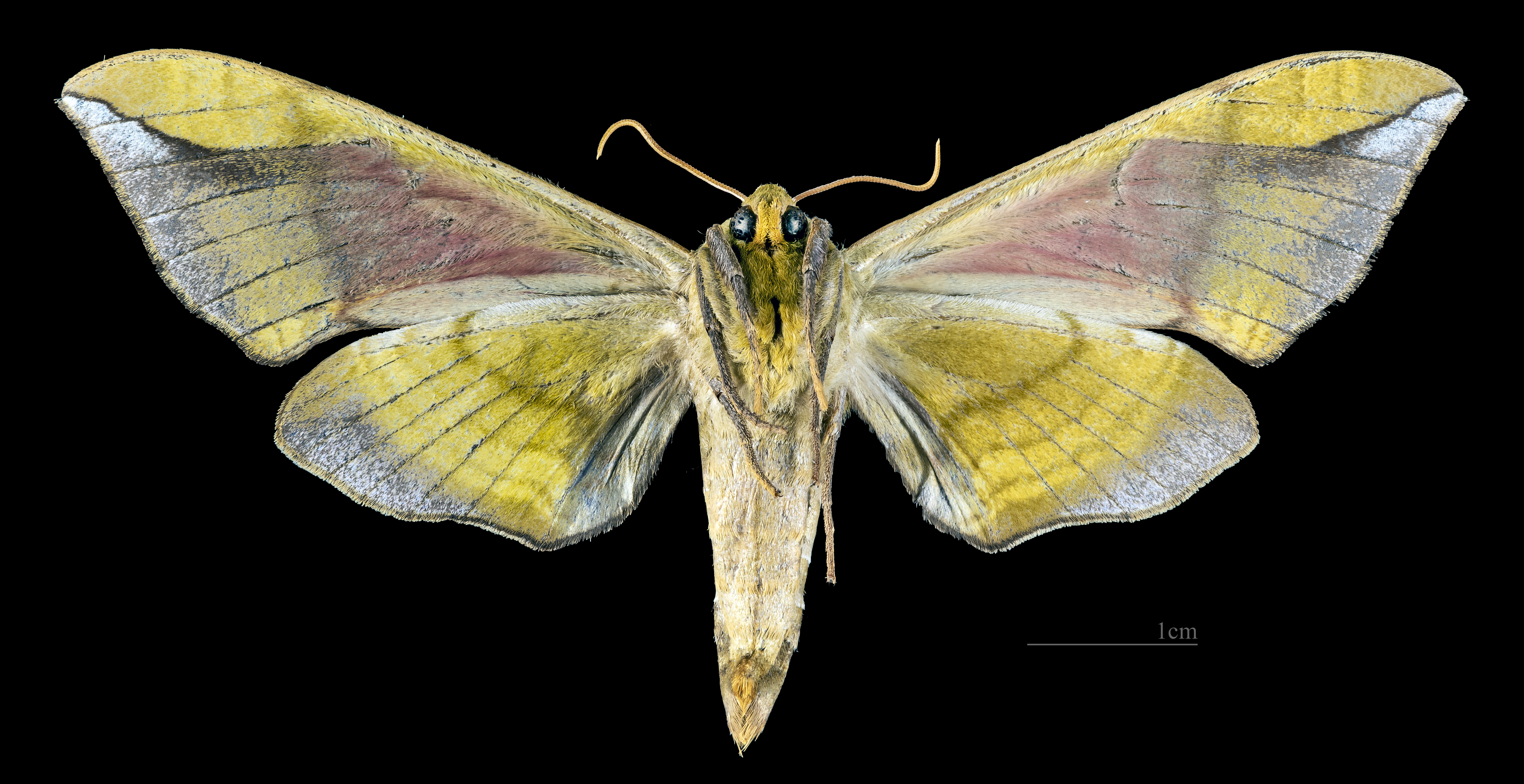
Female C. t. tatarinovii, underside

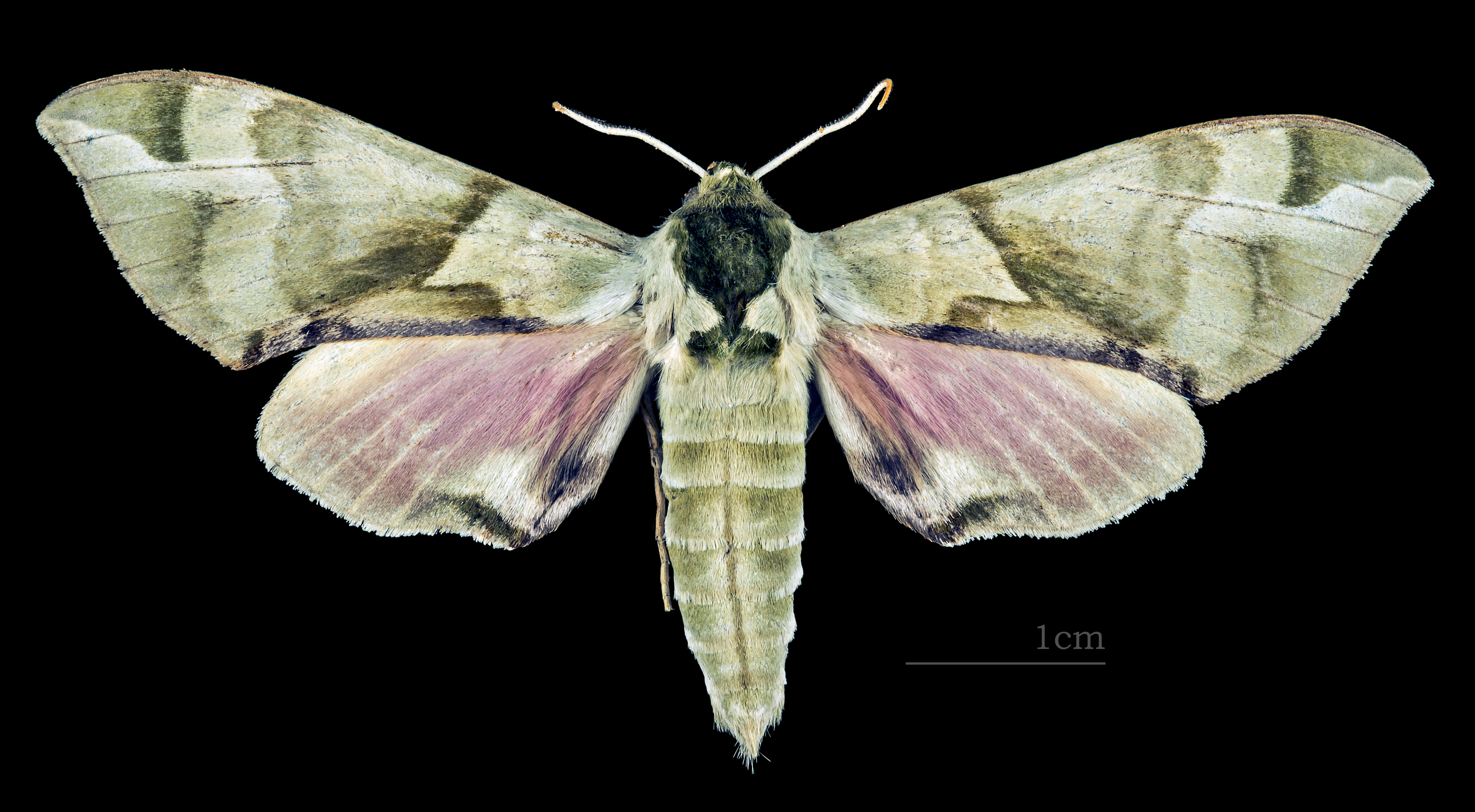
Male C. t. tatarinovii

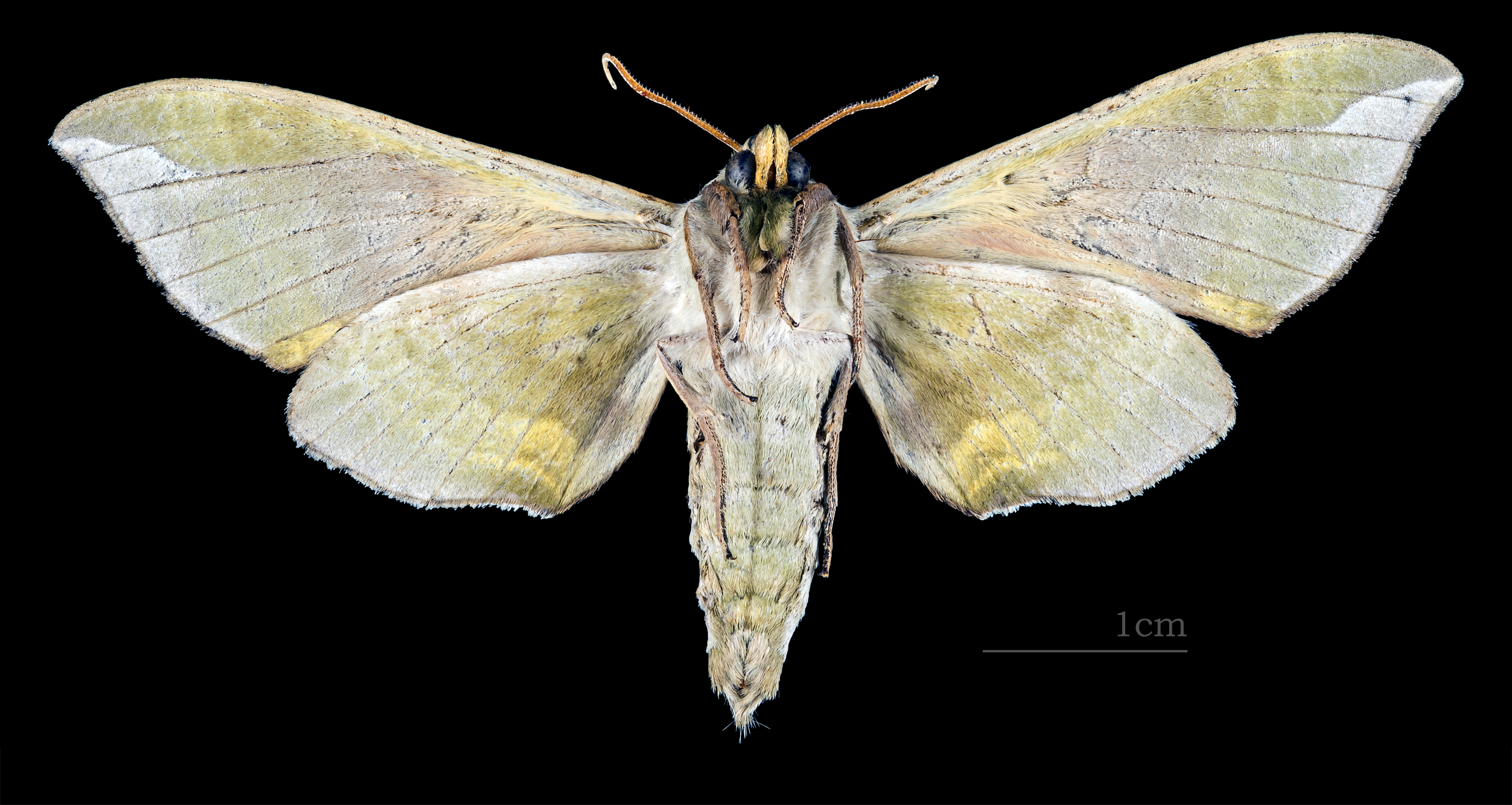
Male C. t. tatarinovii, underside

== Biology ==
There are one to two generations per year in China. In Korea, adults are on wing from early May to mid-October.

== Subspecies ==
- Callambulyx tatarinovii tatarinovii (from northern Xinjiang across northern China, Mongolia, southern Siberia to the Russian Far East and Japan, and then south through Korea and central China to eastern Tibet)
- Callambulyx tatarinovii formosana - Clark, 1935 (Taiwan)
- Callambulyx tatarinovii gabyae - Bryk, 1946 (Japan)
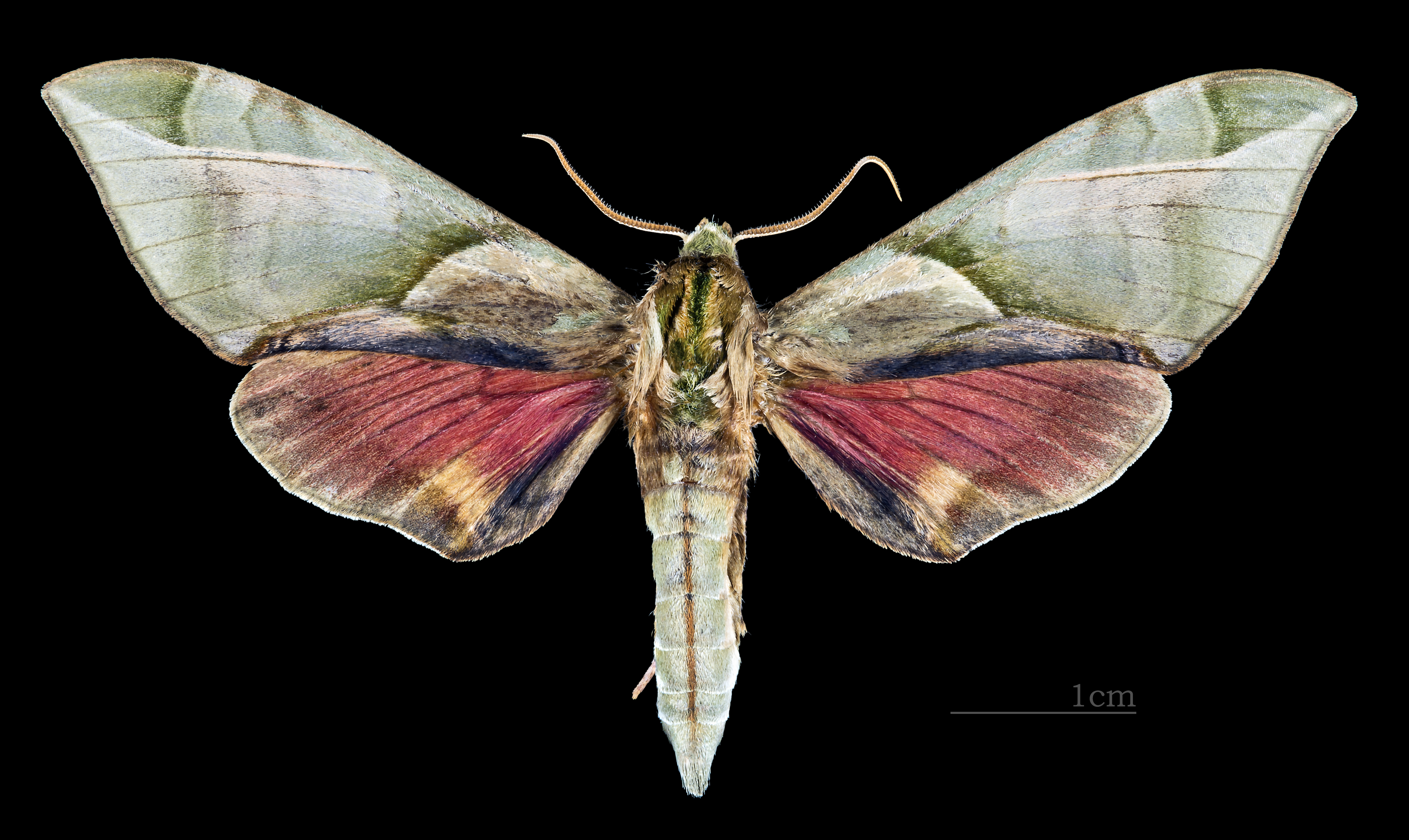
Male C. t. formosana

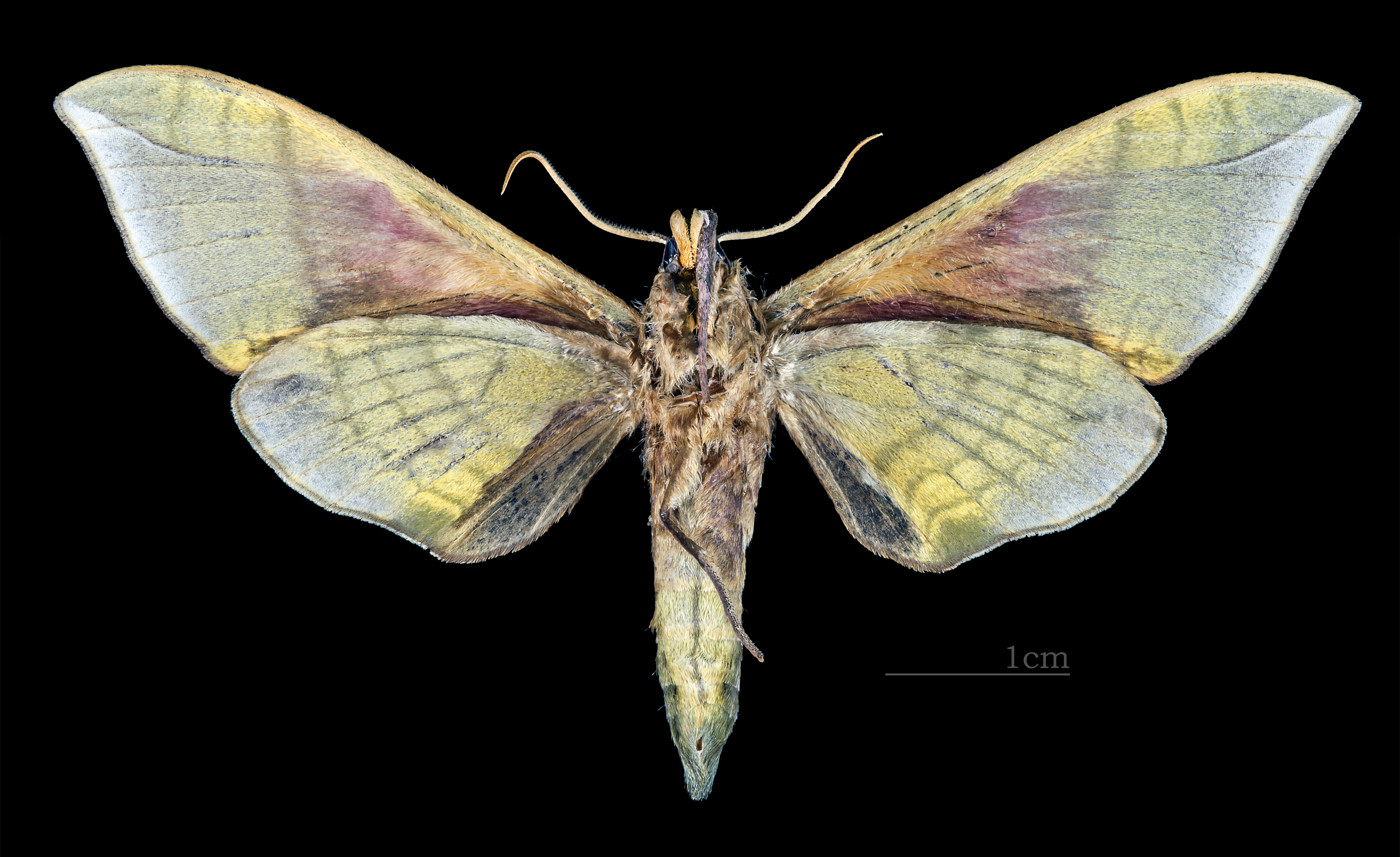
Male C. t. formosana, underside

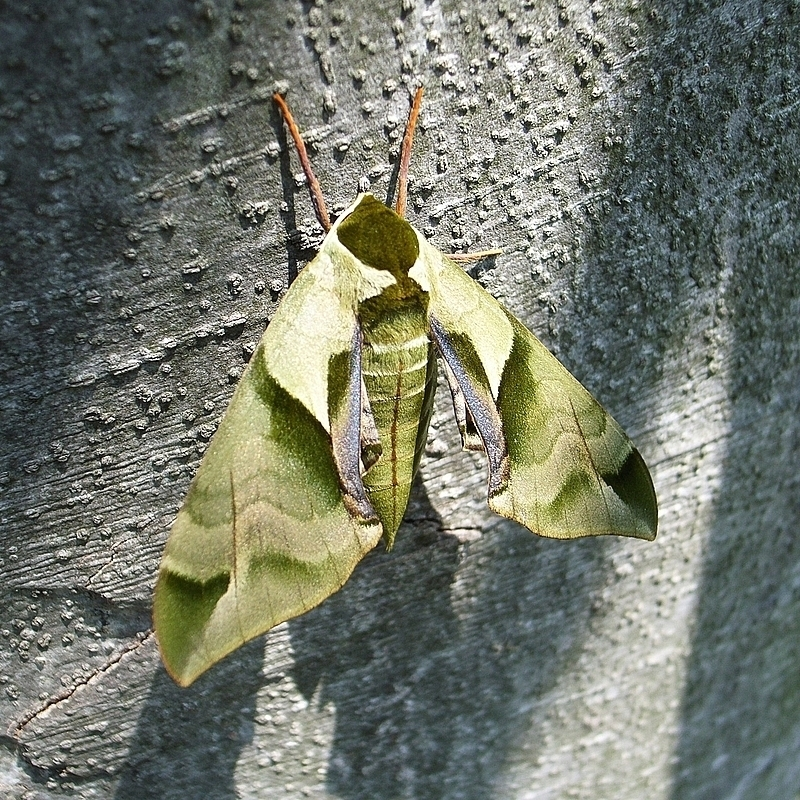
C. t. gabyae
