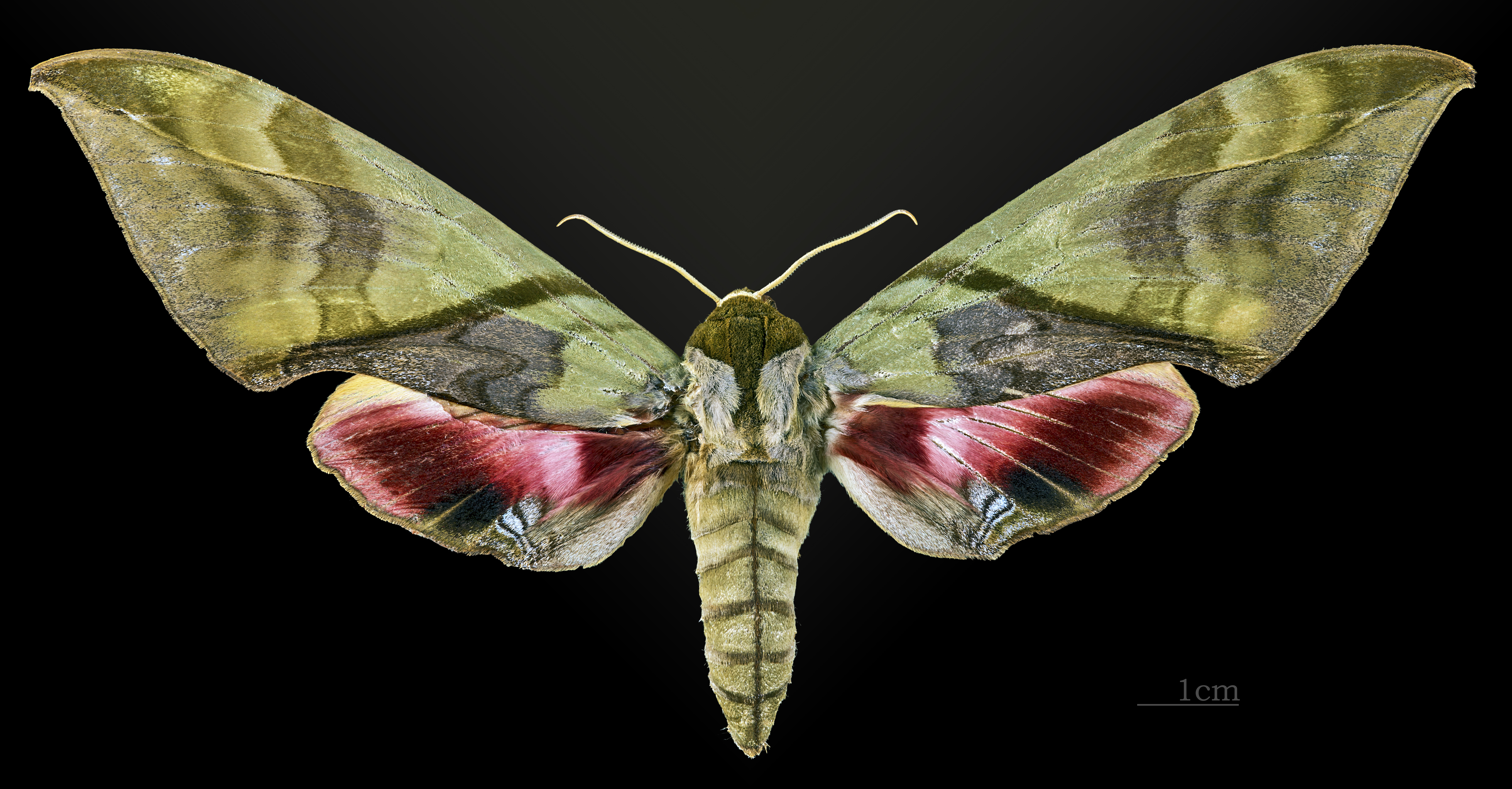
- Callambulyx amanda dorsal
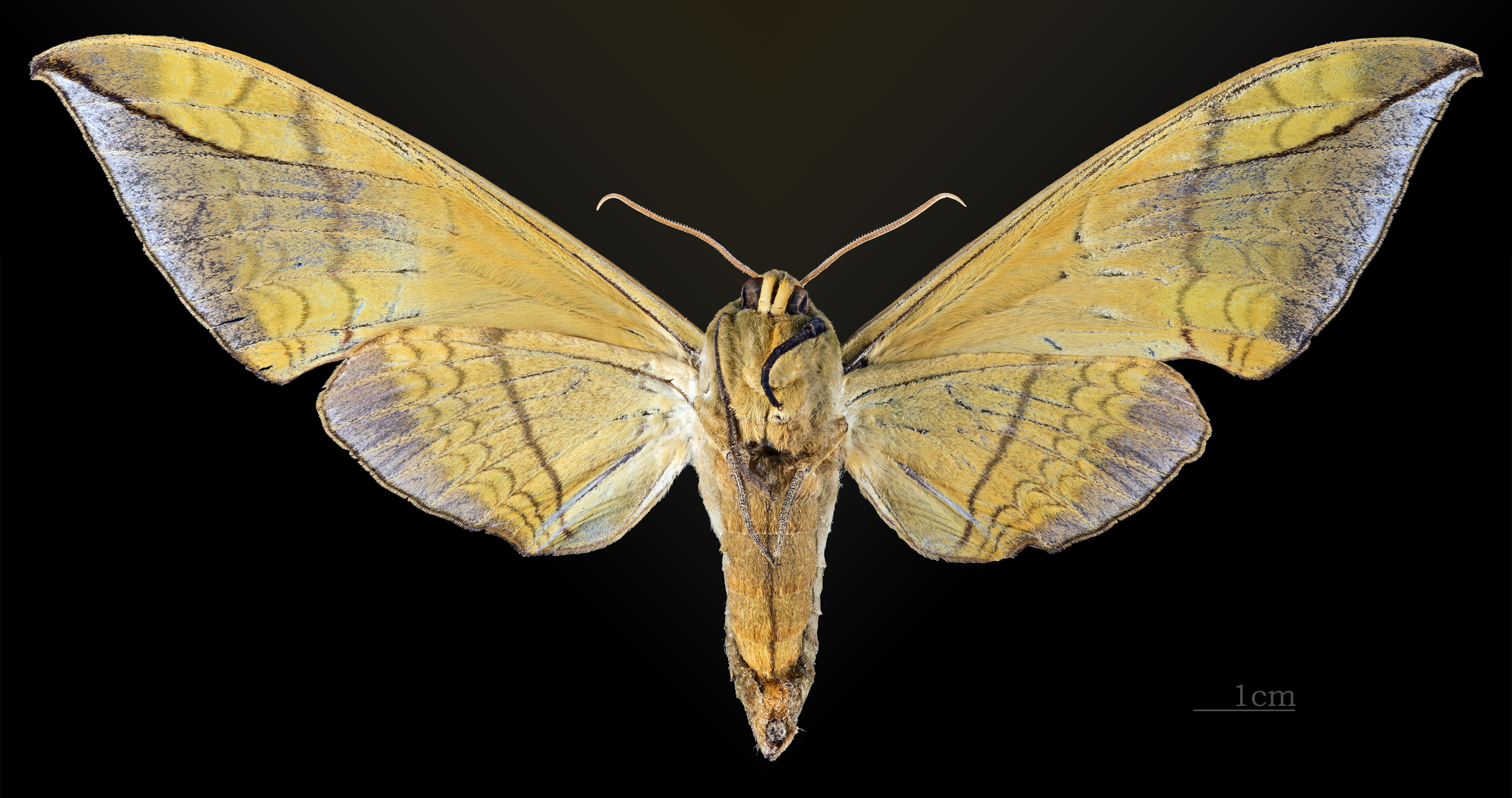
- Callambulyx amanda ventral

Scientific classification
- Domain: Eukaryota
- Kingdom: Animalia
- Phylum: Arthropoda
- Class: Insecta
- Order: Lepidoptera
- Family: Sphingidae
- Genus: Callambulyx
- Species: C. amanda

Binomial name
- Callambulyx amanda Rothschild & Jordan, 1903

= Callambulyx amanda =

Species of moth

Callambulyx amanda is a species of moth of the family Sphingidae. It is known from Burma, Thailand, Malaysia, Sumatra, Borneo and the Philippines.

It is similar to Callambulyx rubricosa, but can be distinguished by the conspicuous black marking near the tornus of the hindwing upperside.
