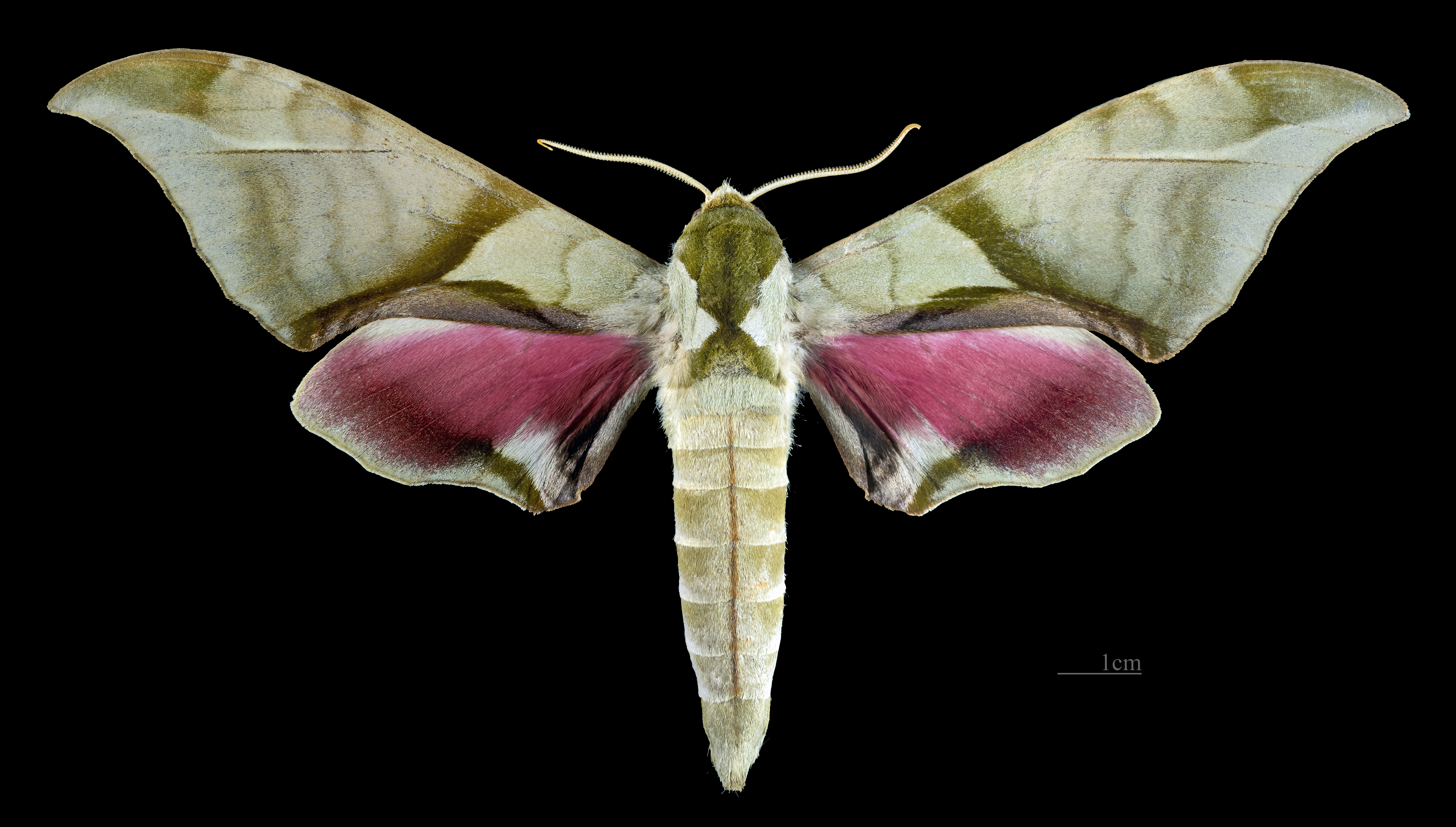
- Male dorsal
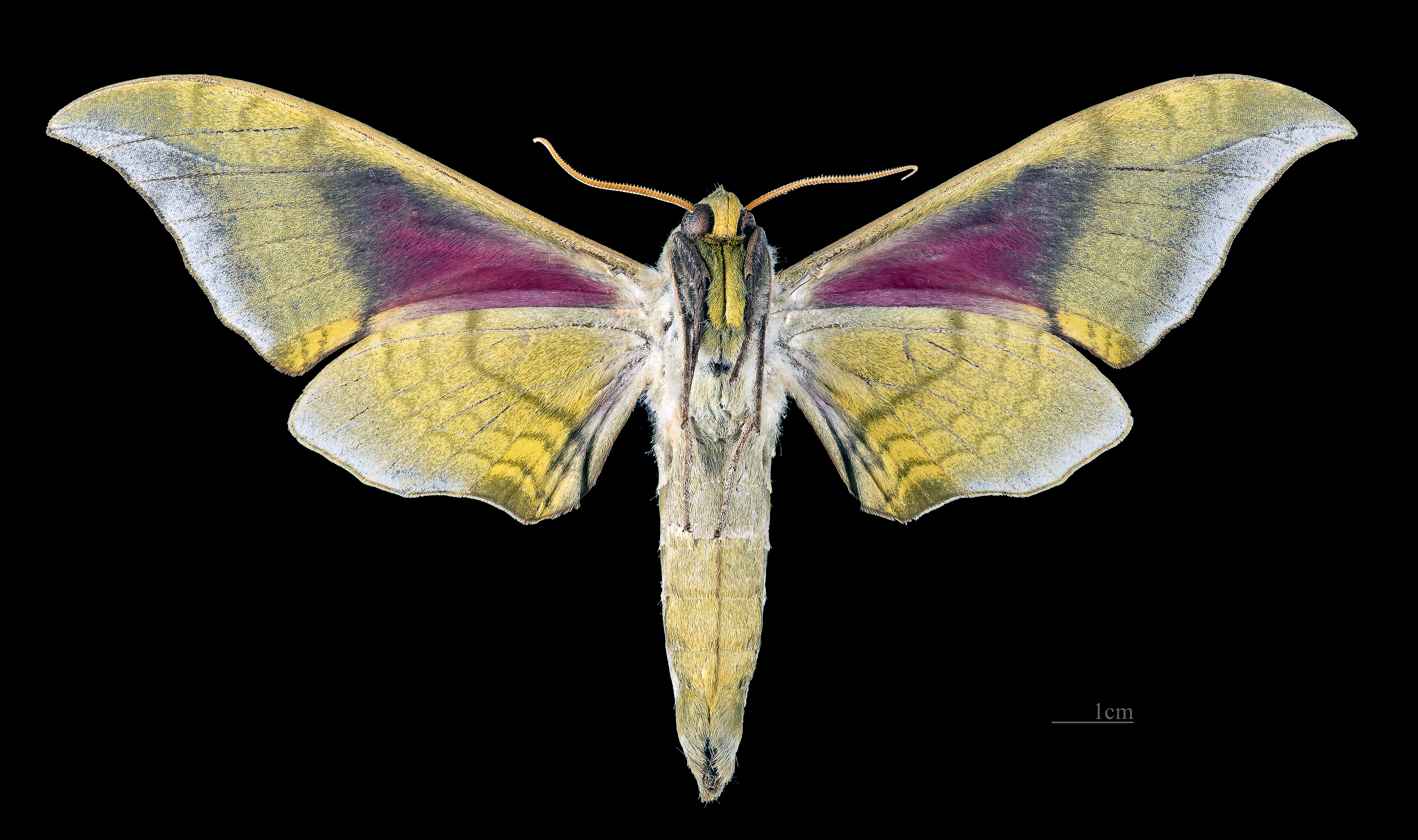
- Male ventral

Scientific classification
- Domain: Eukaryota
- Kingdom: Animalia
- Phylum: Arthropoda
- Class: Insecta
- Order: Lepidoptera
- Family: Sphingidae
- Genus: Callambulyx
- Species: C. poecilus

Binomial name
- Callambulyx poecilus (Rothschild, 1898)

Synonyms
- Ambulyx poecilus Rothschild, 1898

= Callambulyx poecilus =

Species of moth

Callambulyx poecilus is a species of moth of the family Sphingidae. It is found along the southern slopes of the Himalaya, from northern Pakistan, through Nepal and north-eastern India to southern China (Yunnan and Hainan Island), and south into northern Thailand and Vietnam. It is also known from northern Sumatra.

The wingspan is about 77 mm.
