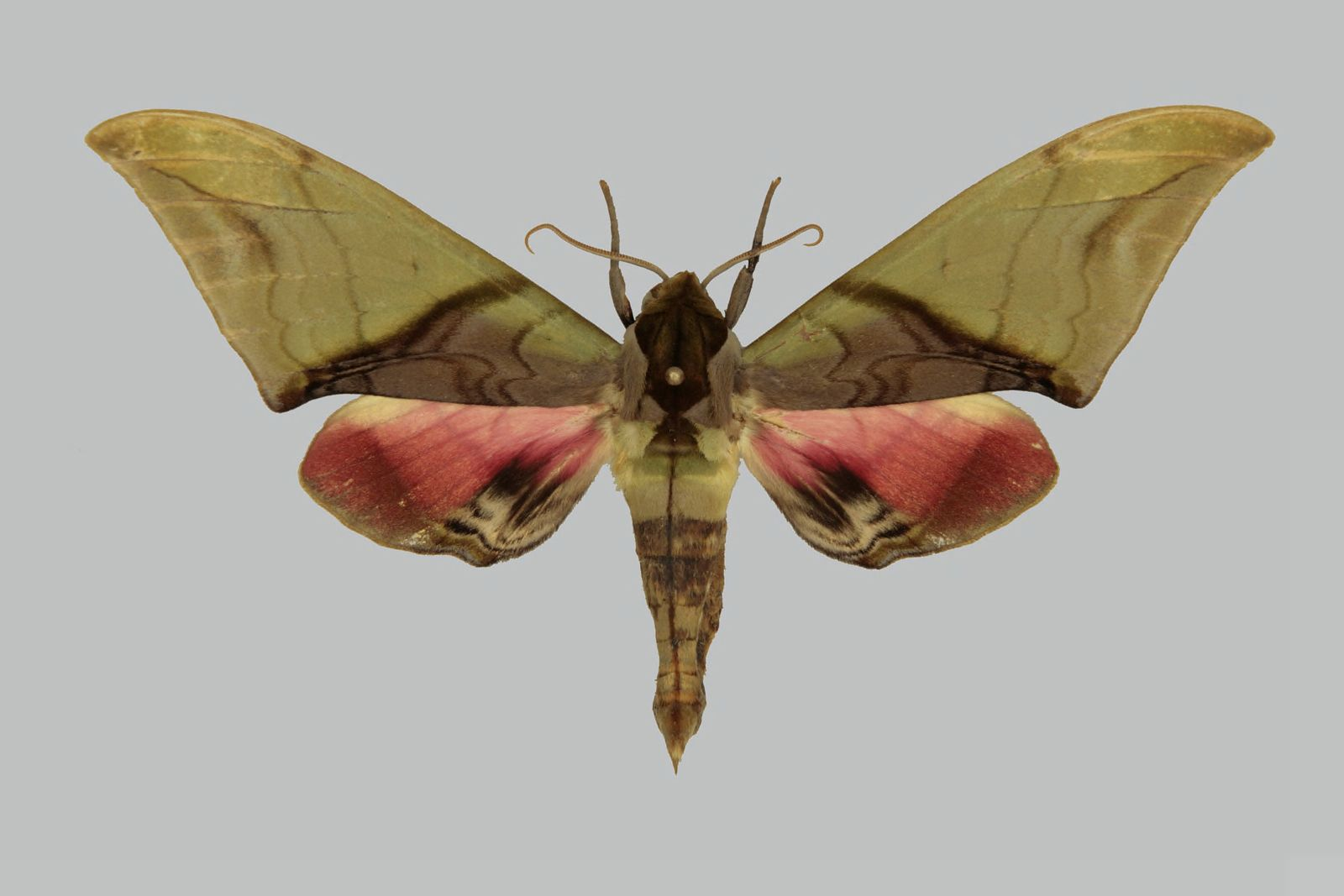
- Callambulyx schintlmeisteri, male, upperside

Scientific classification
- Kingdom: Animalia
- Phylum: Arthropoda
- Class: Insecta
- Order: Lepidoptera
- Family: Sphingidae
- Genus: Callambulyx
- Species: C. schintlmeisteri

Binomial name
- Callambulyx schintlmeisteri Brechlin, 1997

= Callambulyx schintlmeisteri =

Species of moth

Callambulyx schintlmeisteri is a species of moth of the family Sphingidae. It is known from Vietnam.
