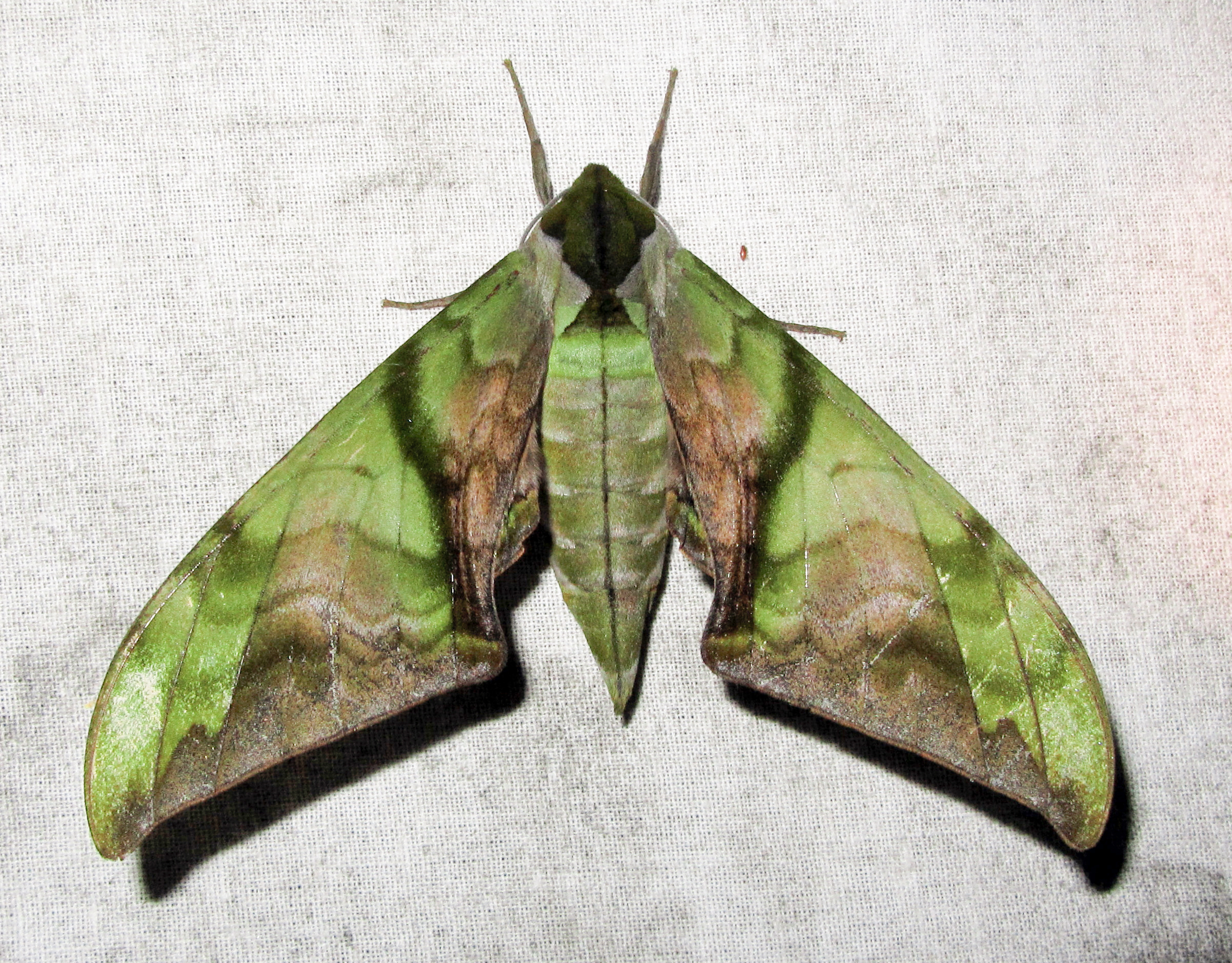

Scientific classification
- Domain: Eukaryota
- Kingdom: Animalia
- Phylum: Arthropoda
- Class: Insecta
- Order: Lepidoptera
- Family: Sphingidae
- Genus: Callambulyx
- Species: C. junonia

Binomial name
- Callambulyx junonia (Butler, 1881)

Synonyms
- Ambulyx junonia Butler, 1881; Callambulyx orbita Chu & Wang, 1980; Callambulyx junonia angusta Clark, 1935; Callambulyx junonia chinensis Clark, 1938

= Callambulyx junonia =

Species of moth

Callambulyx junonia, the eyed pink-and-green hawkmoth, is a species of moth of the family Sphingidae first described by Arthur Gardiner Butler in 1881.

== Distribution ==
It is known from Bhutan, Nagaland in north-eastern India, southern China and northern Vietnam.

== Description ==
The wingspan is about 104 mm.

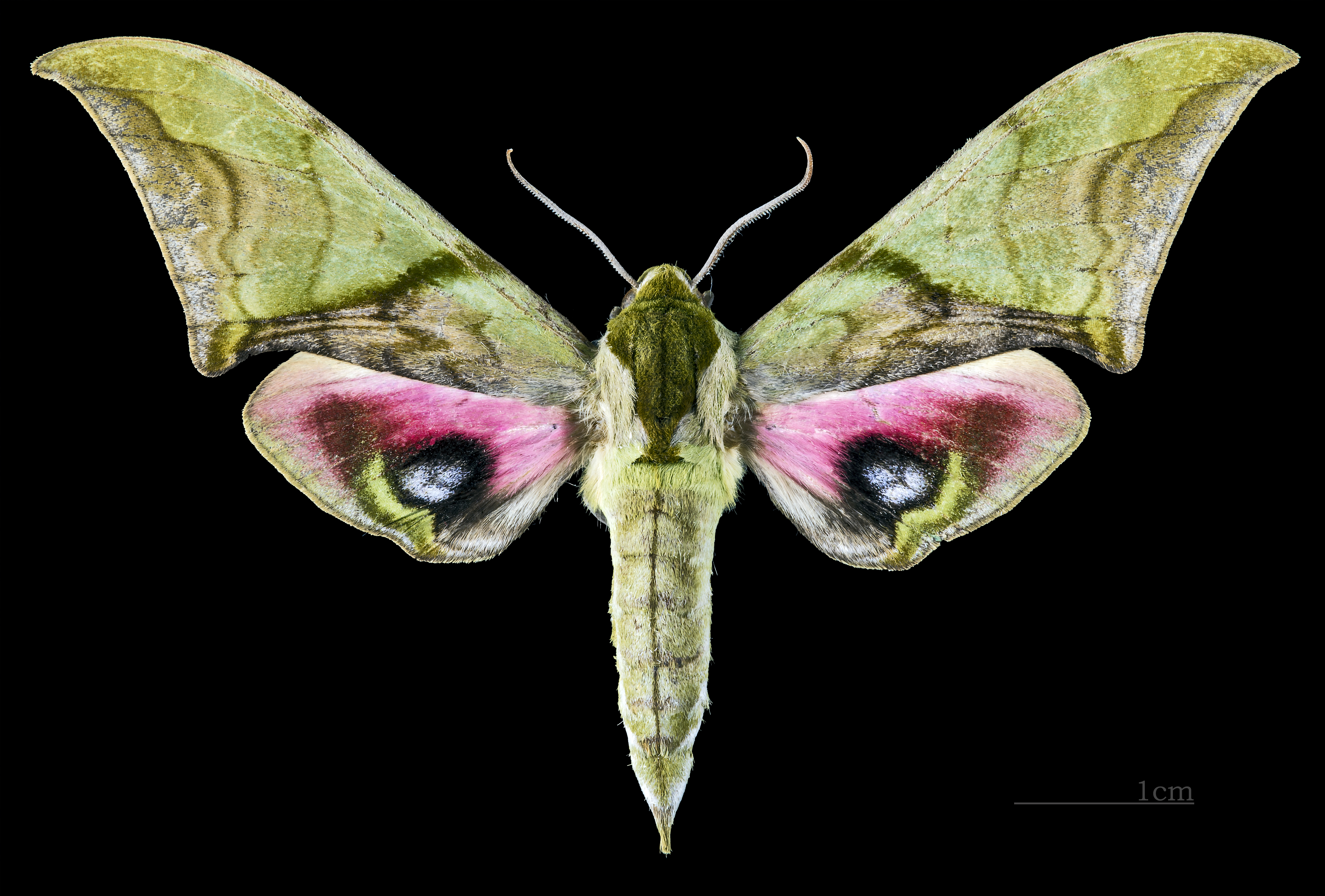
Male dorsal view

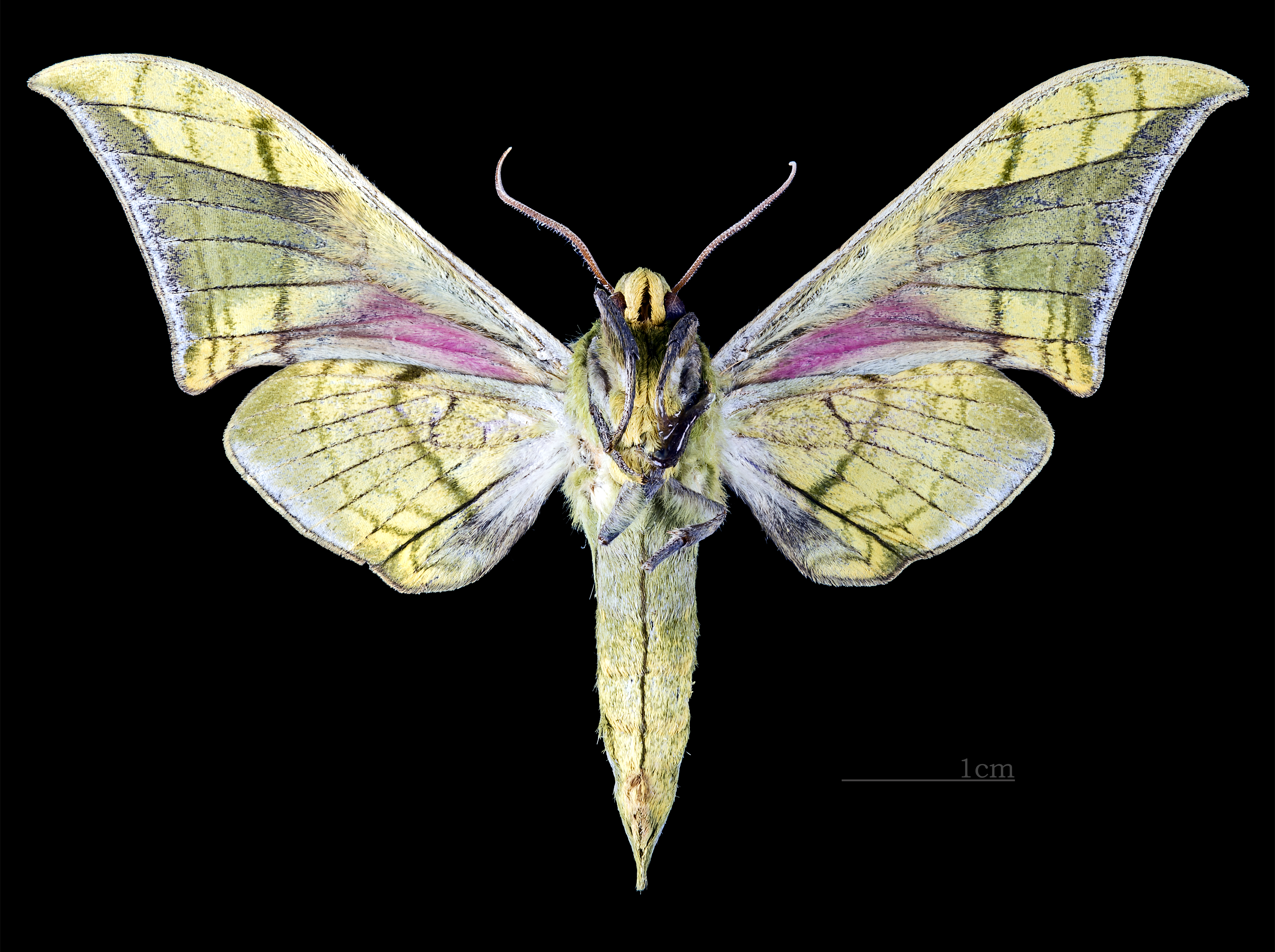
Male ventral view
