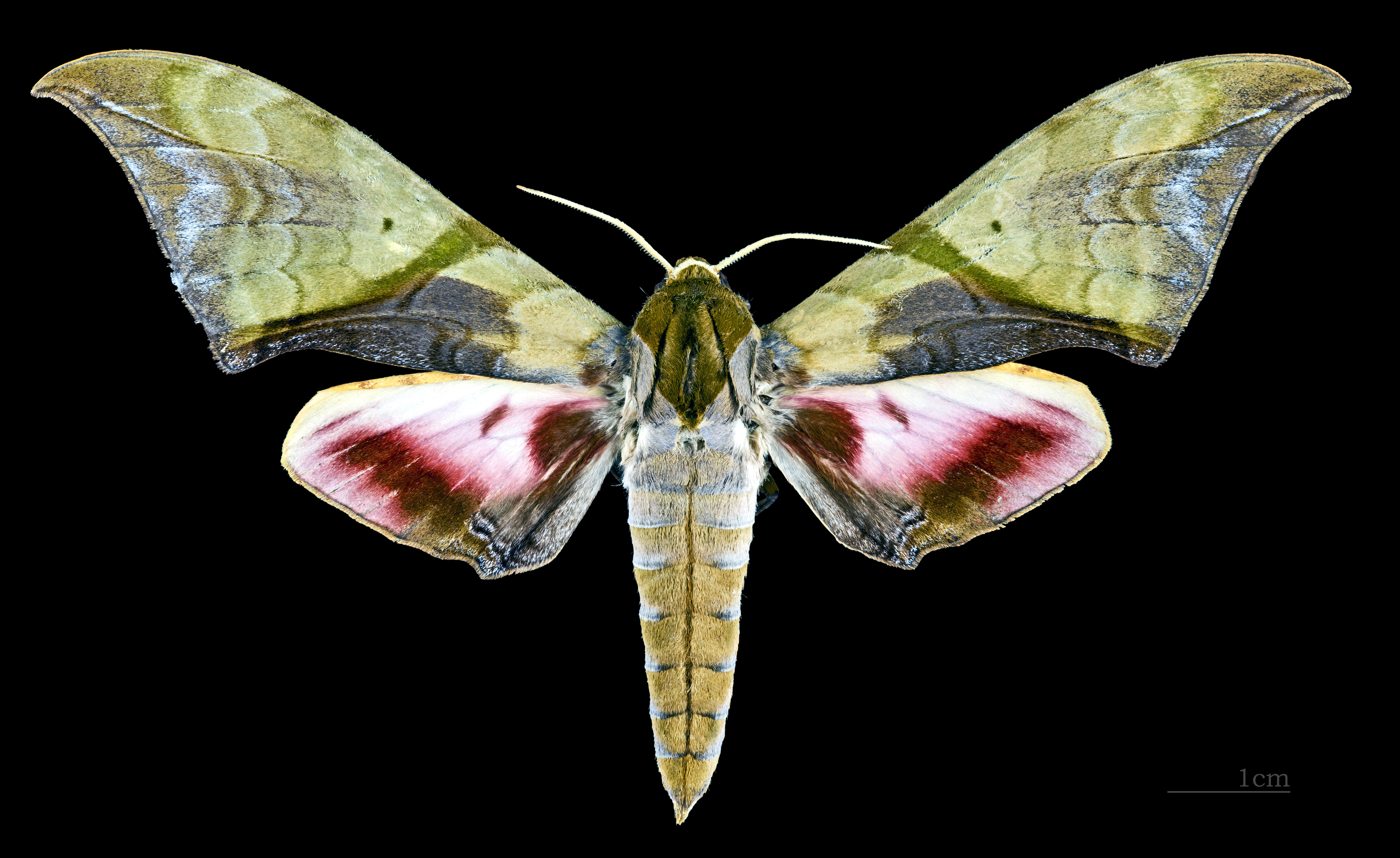
- Male dorsal view
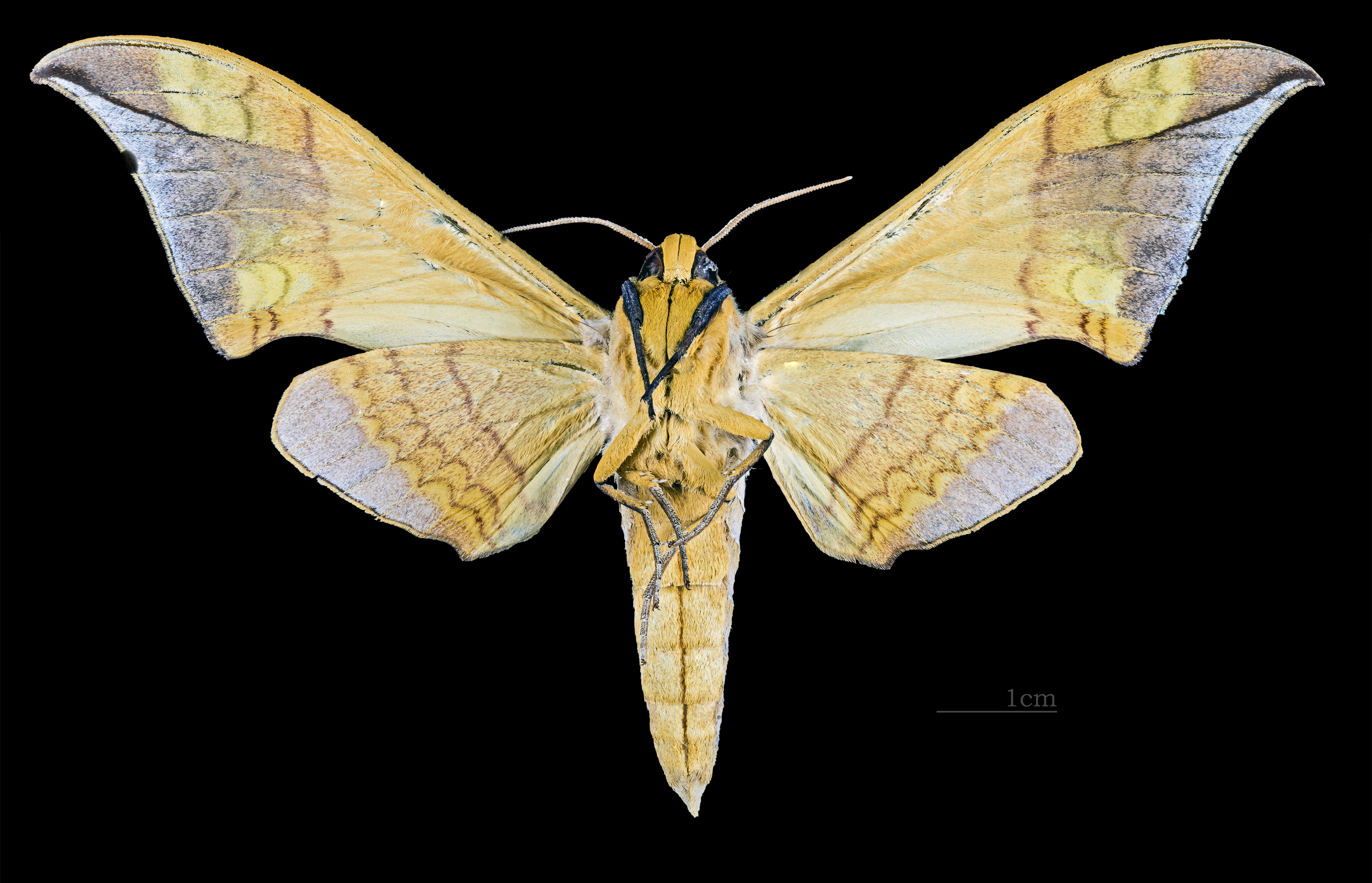
- Male ventral view

Scientific classification
- Domain: Eukaryota
- Kingdom: Animalia
- Phylum: Arthropoda
- Class: Insecta
- Order: Lepidoptera
- Family: Sphingidae
- Genus: Callambulyx
- Species: C. rubricosa

Binomial name
- Callambulyx rubricosa (Walker, 1856)

Synonyms
- Ambulyx rubricosa Walker, 1856; Basiana superba Moore, 1866; Callambulyx rubricosa indochinensis Clark, 1936; Metagastes rubricosa piepersi Snellen, 1880

= Callambulyx rubricosa =

Species of moth

Callambulyx rubricosa, the large pink-and-green hawkmoth, is a species of moth of the family Sphingidae first described by Francis Walker in 1856.

== Distribution ==
It is known from the Nepal, north-eastern India, south-western China, Thailand, Vietnam and Java.

== Description ==
The wingspan is about 132 mm. It is very similar to Callambulyx amanda, but the hindwing upperside lacks a prominent black marking near the tornus.

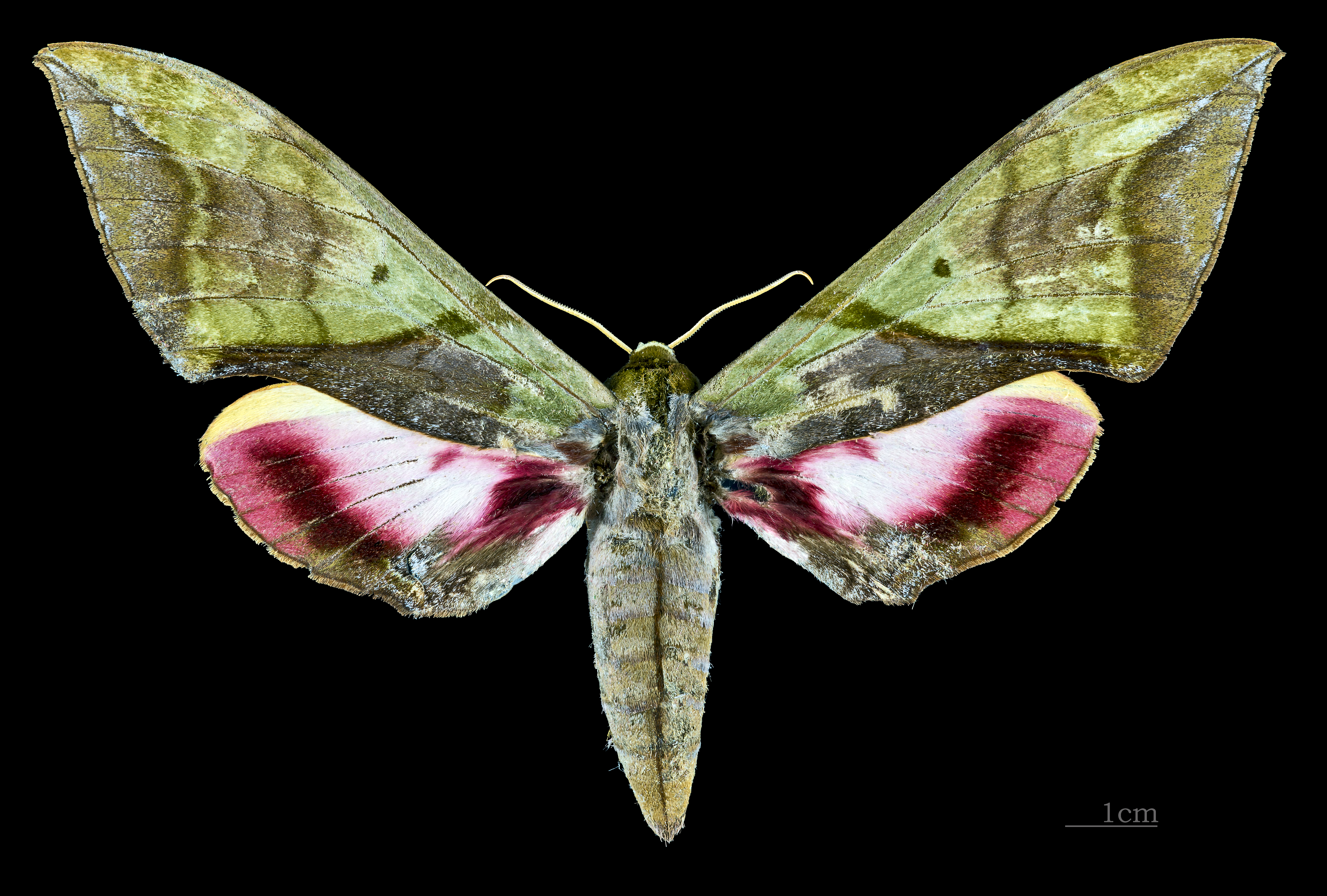
Female dorsal view

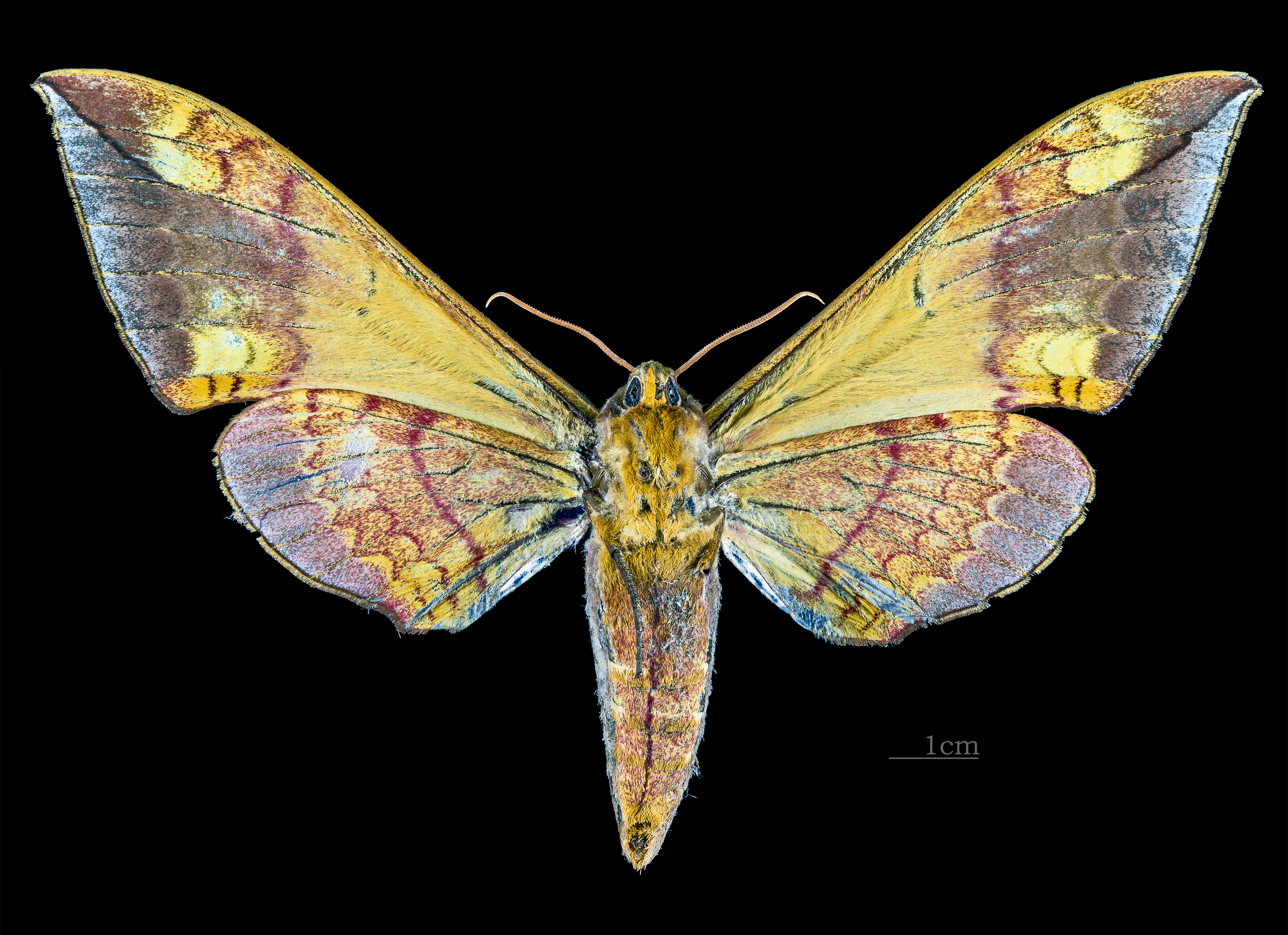
Female ventral view

== Subspecies ==
- Callambulyx rubricosa rubricosa (Nepal, north-eastern India, south-western China, Thailand and Vietnam)
- Callambulyx rubricosa piepersi (Snellen, 1880) (Laos and Java)
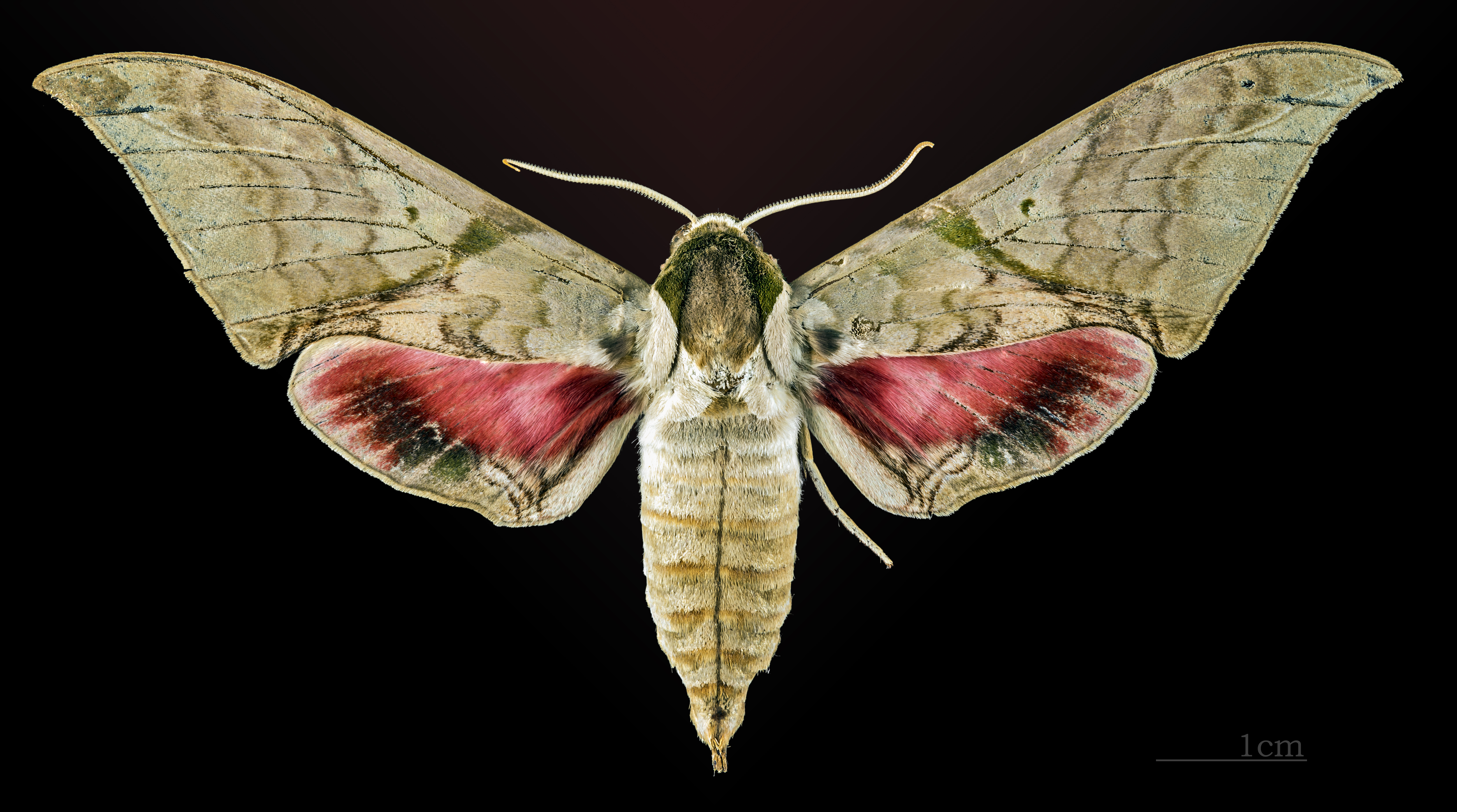
Male

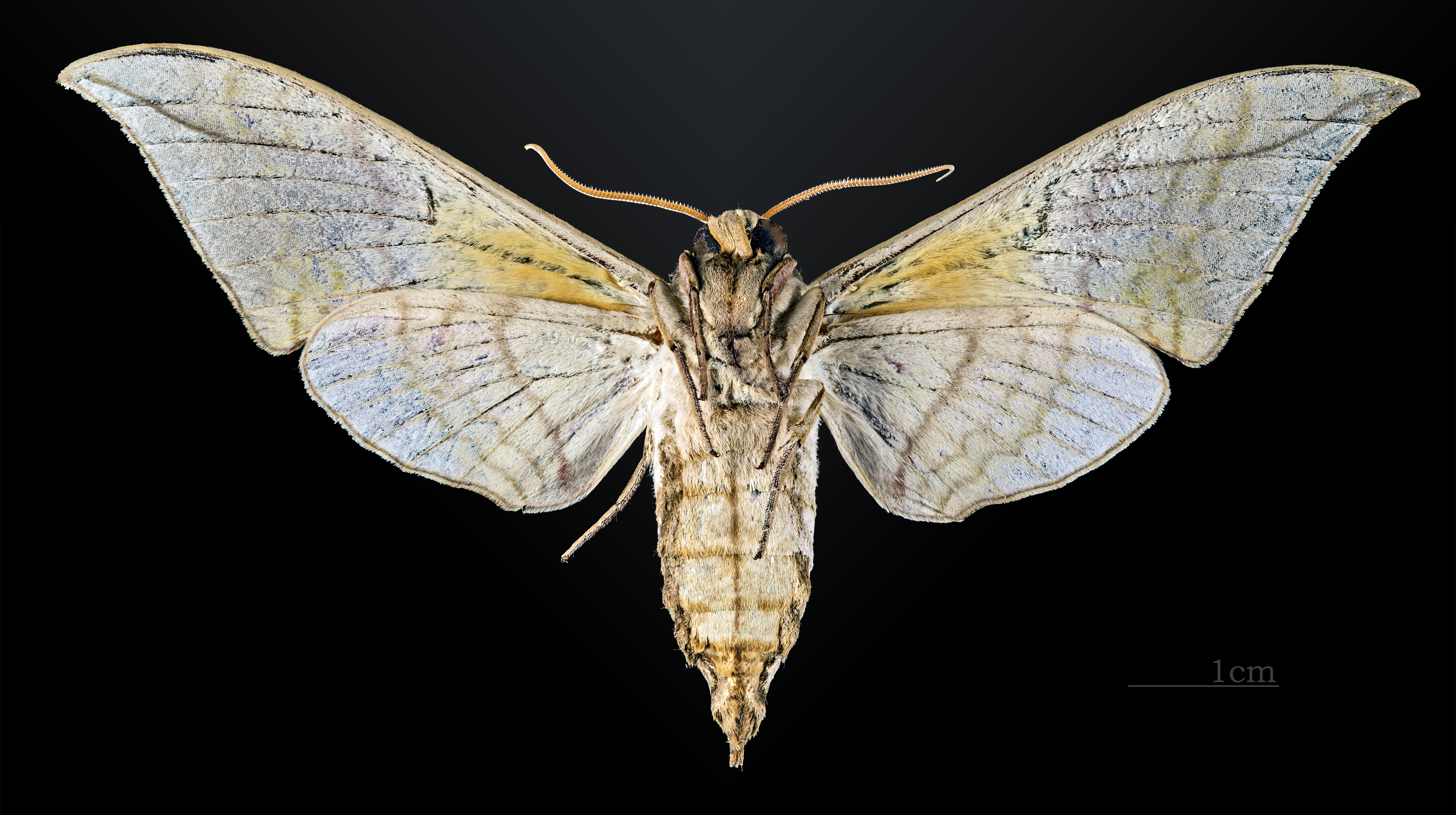
Male underside

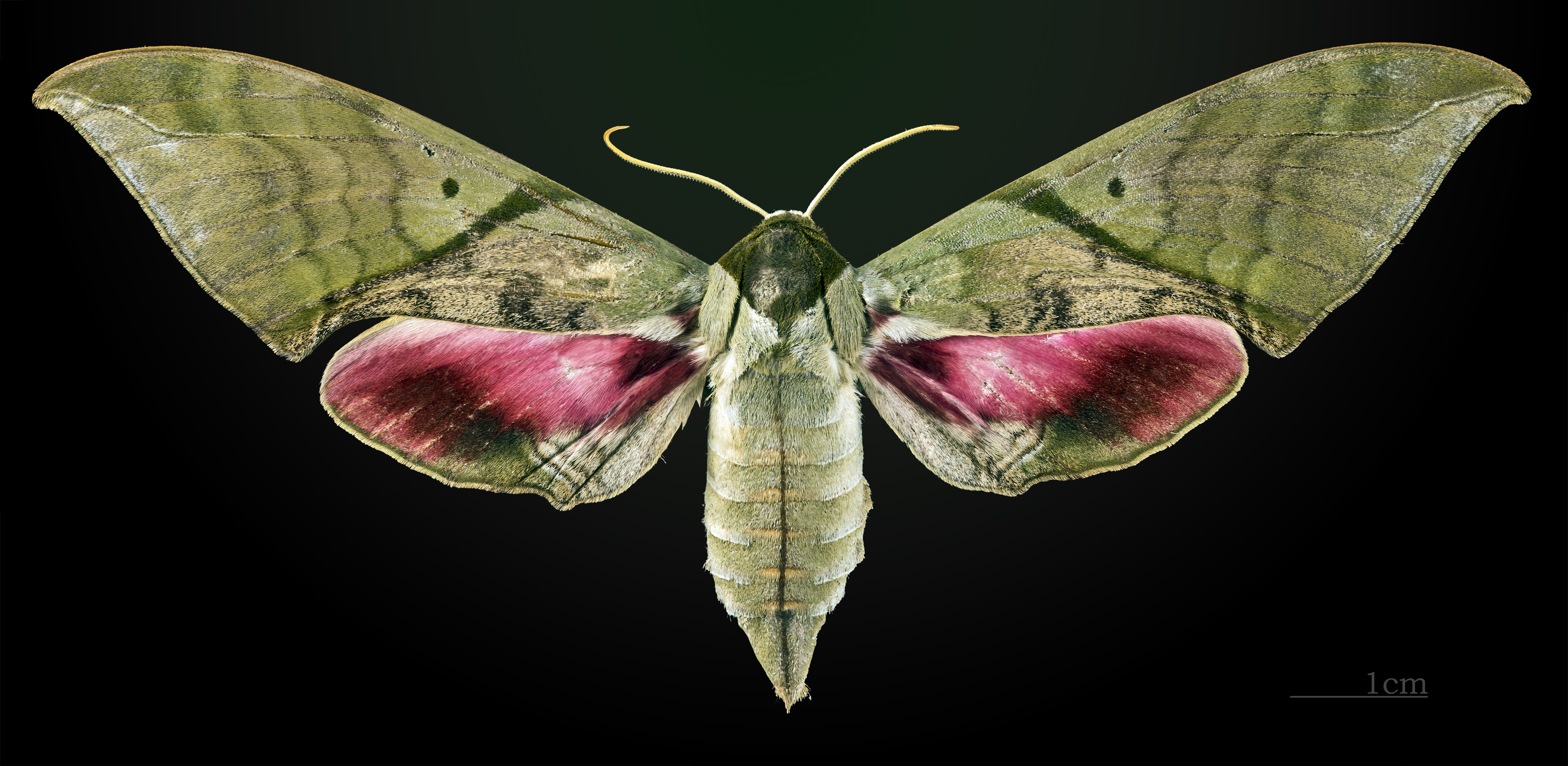
Female

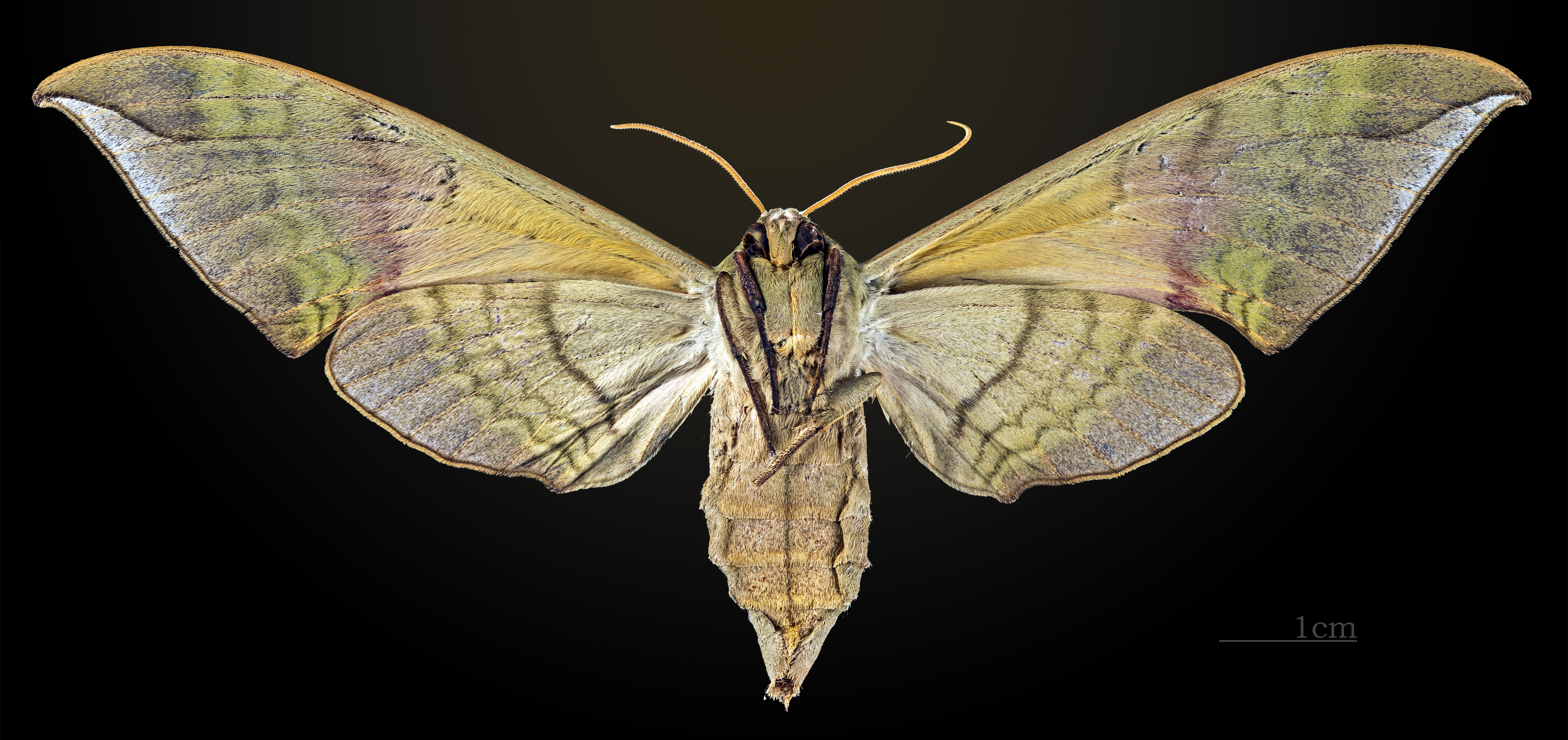
Female underside
