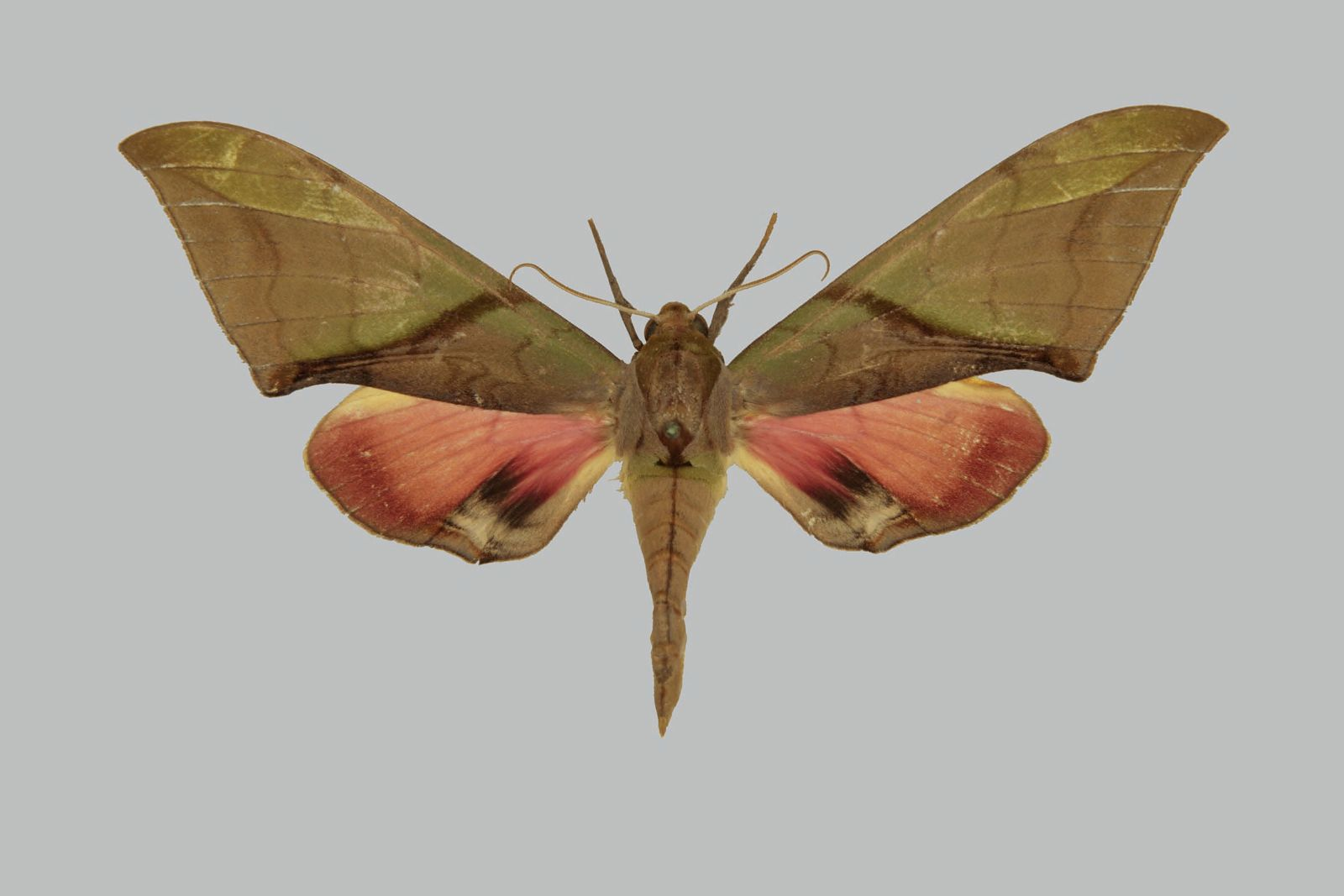
- Female

Scientific classification
- Kingdom: Animalia
- Phylum: Arthropoda
- Clade: Pancrustacea
- Class: Insecta
- Order: Lepidoptera
- Family: Sphingidae
- Genus: Callambulyx
- Species: C. kitchingi

Binomial name
- Callambulyx kitchingi Cadiou, 1996

= Callambulyx kitchingi =

Species of moth

Callambulyx kitchingi is a species of moth in the family Sphingidae. It is known from China.
