= Macroglossum kishidai =

Scientific classification
- Kingdom: Animalia
- Phylum: Arthropoda
- Clade: Pancrustacea
- Class: Insecta
- Order: Lepidoptera
- Family: Sphingidae
- Genus: Macroglossum
- Species: M. kishidai

Binomial name
- Macroglossum kishidai Cadiou, 1998

Synonyms
- Macroglossum haslami kishidai Cadiou, 1998

Species of moth

Macroglossum kishidai is a moth of the family Sphingidae. It is found in Sulawesi.
