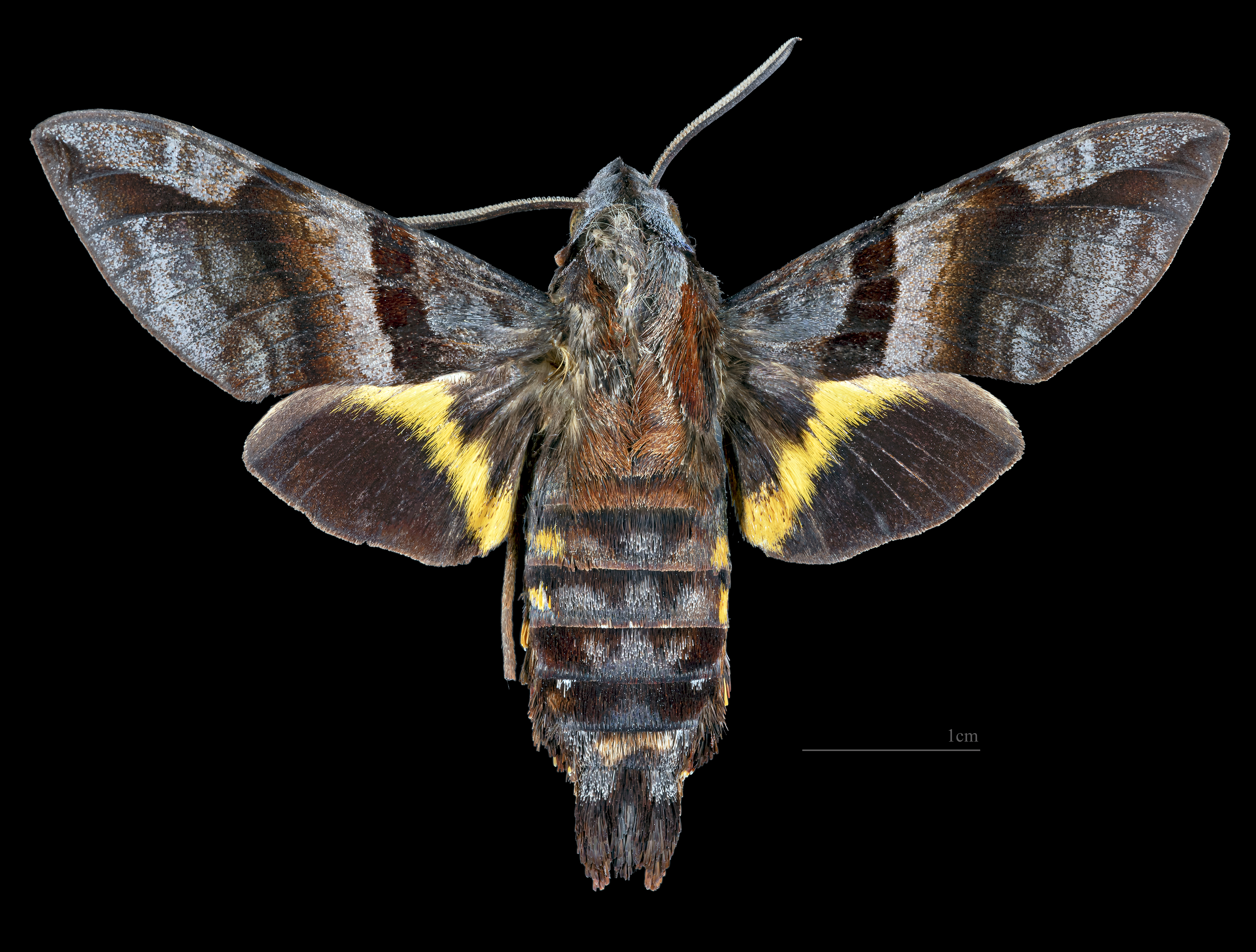
- Male dorsal
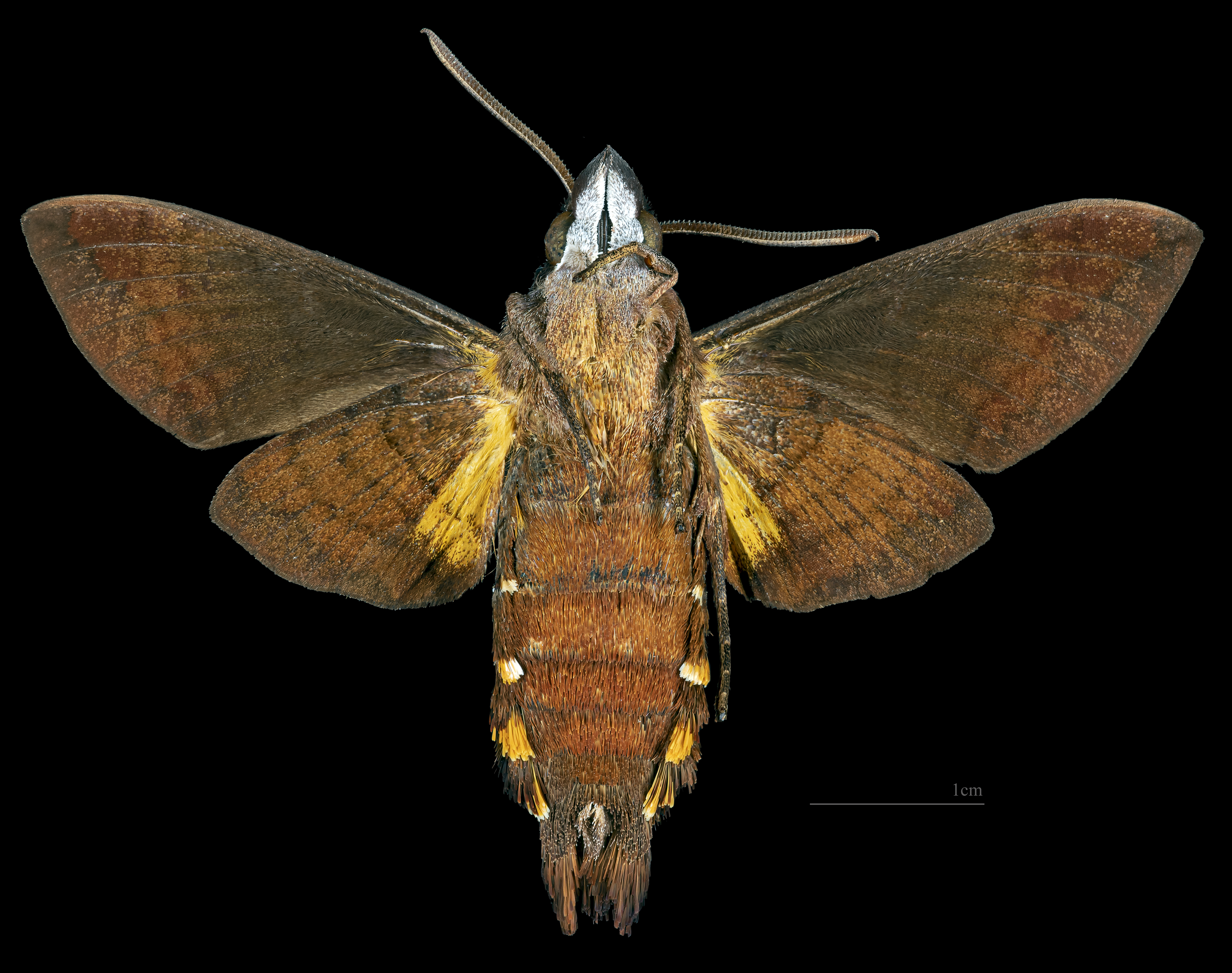
- Male ventral

Scientific classification
- Kingdom: Animalia
- Phylum: Arthropoda
- Class: Insecta
- Order: Lepidoptera
- Family: Sphingidae
- Genus: Macroglossum
- Species: M. augarra

Binomial name
- Macroglossum augarra Rothschild, 1904

= Macroglossum augarra =

Species of moth

Macroglossum augarra is a moth of the family Sphingidae. It is known from the Bismarck Archipelago and Papua New Guinea.
