= Macroglossum adustum =

Scientific classification
- Kingdom: Animalia
- Phylum: Arthropoda
- Class: Insecta
- Order: Lepidoptera
- Family: Sphingidae
- Genus: Macroglossum
- Species: M. adustum

Binomial name
- Macroglossum adustum Rothschild & Jordan, 1916

Species of moth

Macroglossum adustum is a moth of the family Sphingidae. It is known from the Solomon Islands.
