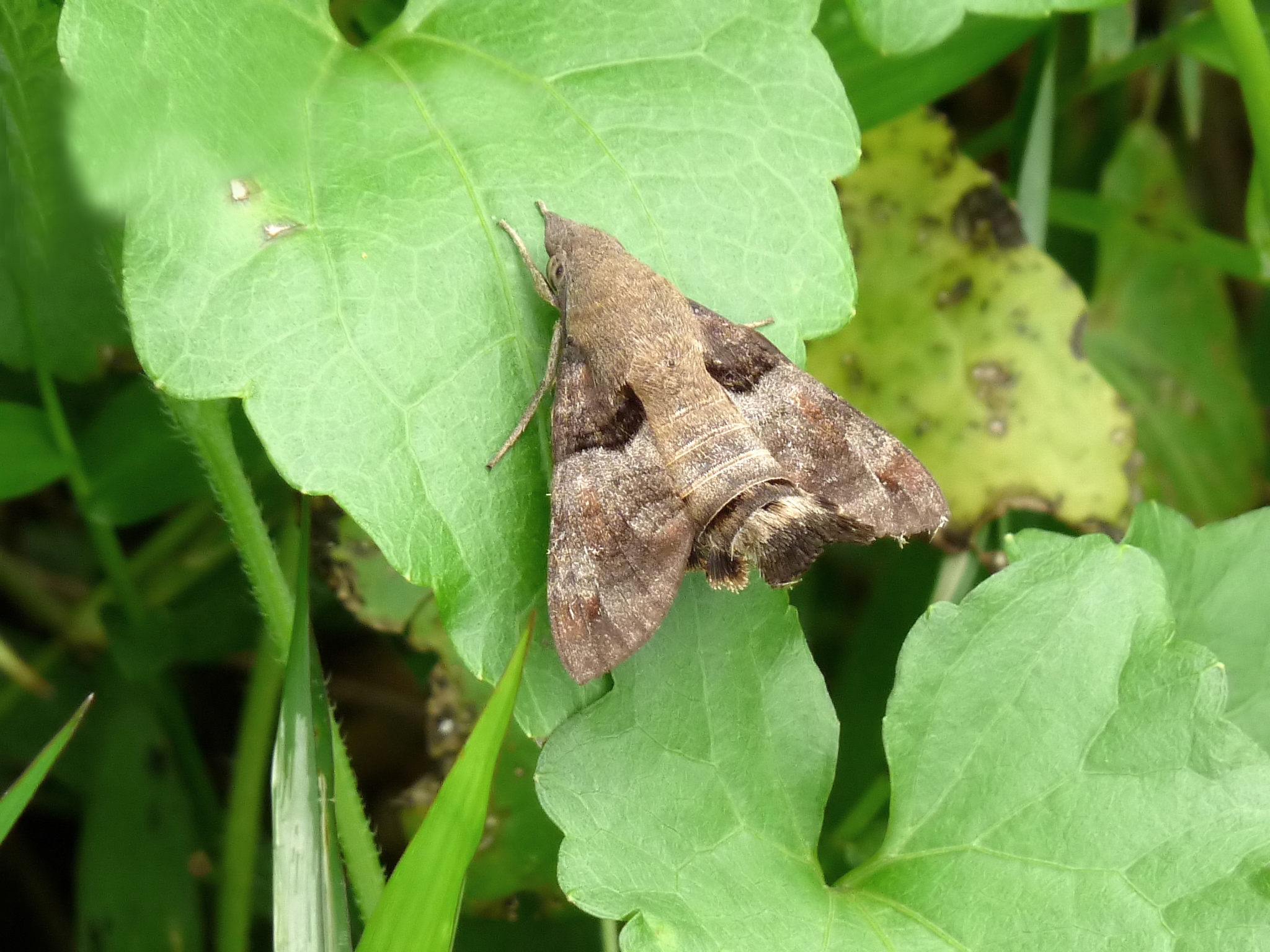
- Macroglossum gyrans in Kadavoor, Kerala, India

Scientific classification
- Domain: Eukaryota
- Kingdom: Animalia
- Phylum: Arthropoda
- Class: Insecta
- Order: Lepidoptera
- Family: Sphingidae
- Subfamily: Macroglossinae
- Tribe: Macroglossini
- Subtribe: Macroglossina
- Genus: Macroglossum; Scopoli, 1777

Species
- 113 - see text

Synonyms
- Rhopalopsyche Butler, 1875; Rhamphoschisma Wallengren, 1858; Psithyros Hübner, 1819; Macroglossa Ochsenheimer, 1816; Macroglossa Boisduval, 1833; Bombylia Hübner, 1822; Bombylia Hübner, 1806

= Macroglossum =

Genus of moths

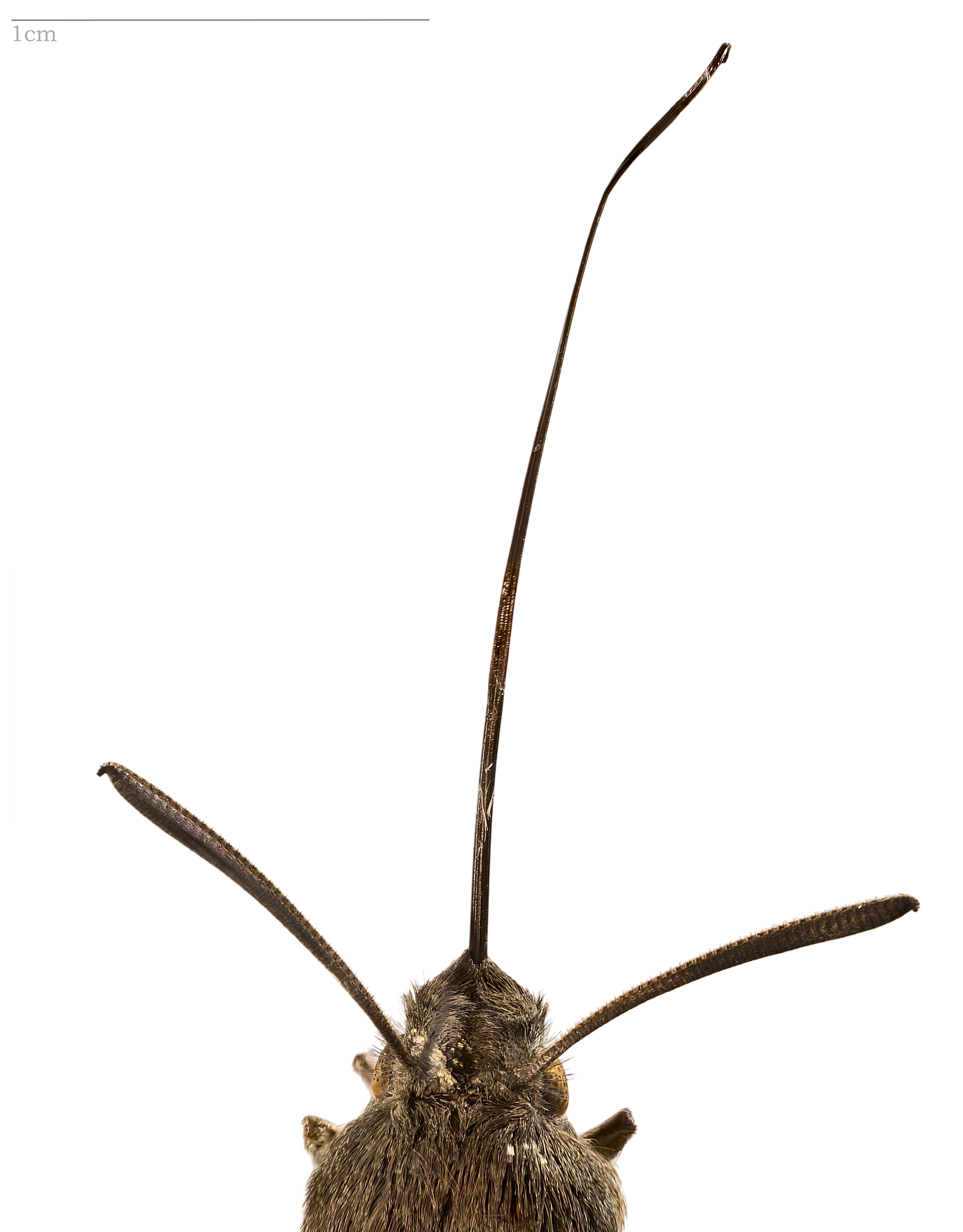
Macroglossum: View of the proboscis extended, which inspired the name of the animal. Literally the long tongue.

Macroglossum is a genus of moths in the family Sphingidae. The genus was erected by Giovanni Antonio Scopoli in 1777.

== Species ==
- Macroglossum adustum Rothschild & Jordan, 1916
- Macroglossum aesalon Mabille, 1879
- Macroglossum affictitia Butler, 1875
- Macroglossum albigutta Rothschild & Jordan, 1903
- Macroglossum albolineata Clark, 1935
- Macroglossum alcedo Boisduval, 1832
- Macroglossum alluaudi de Joannis, 1893
- Macroglossum amoenum Rothschild & Jordan, 1903
- Macroglossum aquila Boisduval, 1875
- Macroglossum arimasi Hogenes & Treadaway, 1993
- Macroglossum assimilis Swainson, 1821
- Macroglossum augarra Rothschild, 1904
- Macroglossum avicula Boisduval, 1875
- Macroglossum backi Eitschberger, 2009
- Macroglossum belis (Linnaeus, 1758)
- Macroglossum bifasciata (Butler, 1875)
- Macroglossum bombylans Boisduval, 1875
- Macroglossum buini Clark, 1926
- Macroglossum buruensis Holland, 1900
- Macroglossum cadioui Schnitzler & Speidel, 2004
- Macroglossum caldum Jordan, 1926
- Macroglossum calescens Butler, 1882
- Macroglossum castaneum Rothschild & Jordan, 1903
- Macroglossum clemensi Cadiou, 1998
- Macroglossum corythus Walker, 1856
- Macroglossum dohertyi Rothschild, 1894
- Macroglossum divergens Walker, 1856
- Macroglossum eggeri Eitschberger, 2003
- Macroglossum eichhorni Rothschild & Jordan, 1903
- Macroglossum faro (Cramer, 1779)
- Macroglossum fischeri Eitschberger, 2009
- Macroglossum fritzei Rothschild & Jordan, 1903
- Macroglossum fruhstorferi Huwe, 1895
- Macroglossum glaucoptera Butler, 1875
- Macroglossum godeffroyi (Butler, 1882)
- Macroglossum gyrans Walker, 1856
- Macroglossum haslami Clark, 1922
- Macroglossum haxairei Eitschberger, 2003
- Macroglossum hemichroma Butler, 1875
- Macroglossum hirundo Boisduval, 1832
- Macroglossum incredibile Eitschberger, 2006
- Macroglossum insipida Butler, 1875
- Macroglossum jani Hogenes & Treadaway, 1998
- Macroglossum joannisi Rothschild & Jordan, 1903
- Macroglossum kadneri Eitschberger, 2004
- Macroglossum kishidai Cadiou, 1998
- Macroglossum kitchingi Cadiou, 1997
- Macroglossum kleineri Eitschberger, 2006
- Macroglossum lepidum Rothschild & Jordan, 1915
- Macroglossum leytensis Eitschberger, 2006
- Macroglossum limata C. Swinhoe, 1892
- Macroglossum luteata Butler, 1875
- Macroglossum malitum Zwick & Treadaway, 2001
- Macroglossum marquesanum Collenette, 1935
- Macroglossum mediovitta Rothschild & Jordan, 1903
- Macroglossum meeki Rothschild & Jordan, 1903
- Macroglossum melanoleuca Cadiou & Schnitzler, 2001
- Macroglossum melas Rothschild & Jordan, 1903
- Macroglossum micacea Walker, 1856
- Macroglossum milvus (Boisduval, 1833)
- Macroglossum mitchellii Boisduval, 1875
- Macroglossum moecki Rutimeyer, 1969
- Macroglossum mouldsi Lachlan & Kitching, 2001
- Macroglossum multifascia Rothschild & Jordan, 1903
- Macroglossum napolovi Eitschberger, 2004
- Macroglossum nemesis Cadiou, 1998
- Macroglossum neotroglodytus Kitching & Cadiou, 2000
- Macroglossum nigellum Rothschild & Jordon, 1916
- Macroglossum nubilum Rothschild & Jordan, 1903
- Macroglossum nycteris Kollar, 1844
- Macroglossum oceanicum Rothschild & Jordan, 1915
- Macroglossum pachycerus Rothschild & Jordan, 1903
- Macroglossum palawana Eitschberger & Treadaway, 2004
- Macroglossum particolor Rothschild & Jordan, 1903
- Macroglossum passalus (Drury, 1773)
- Macroglossum paukstadtorum Eitschberger, 2005
- Macroglossum perplexum Eitschberger, 2003
- Macroglossum phocinum Rothschild & Jordan, 1903
- Macroglossum poecilum Rothschild & Jordan, 1903
- Macroglossum prometheus Boisduval, 1875
- Macroglossum pseudocorythus Eitschberger, 2003
- Macroglossum pseudoluteata Eitschberger, 2003
- Macroglossum pseudonigellum Eitschberger, 2006
- Macroglossum pyrrhosticta Butler, 1875
- Macroglossum queenslandi Clark, 1927
- Macroglossum rectans Rothschild & Jordan, 1903
- Macroglossum regulus Boisduval, 1875
- Macroglossum reithi Cadiou, 1997
- Macroglossum ronja Eitschberger, 2009
- Macroglossum saga Butler, 1878
- Macroglossum schnitzleri Cadiou, 1998
- Macroglossum semifasciata Hampson, 1893
- Macroglossum sitiene Walker, 1856
- Macroglossum soror Rothschild & Jordan, 1903
- Macroglossum spilonotum Rothschild & Jordon, 1912
- Macroglossum stellatarum (Linnaeus, 1758)
- Macroglossum stenoxanthum Turner, 1925
- Macroglossum stevensi Clark, 1935
- Macroglossum stigma Rothschild & Jordan, 1903
- Macroglossum sulai Eitschberger, 2003
- Macroglossum svetlana Eitschberger & Fischer, 2009
- Macroglossum sylvia Boisduval, 1875
- Macroglossum tangalleum Eitschberger & Schnitzler, 2006
- Macroglossum tenebrosa Lucas, 1891
- Macroglossum tenimberi Clark, 1920
- Macroglossum trigi Eitschberger, 2004
- Macroglossum trochilus (Hübner, 1823)
- Macroglossum ungues Rothschild & Jordan, 1903
- Macroglossum vacillans Walker, 1865
- Macroglossum vadenberghi Hogenes, 1984
- Macroglossum variegatum Rothschild & Jordan, 1903
- Macroglossum vicinum Jordan, 1923
- Macroglossum vidua Rothschild & Jordan, 1903
- Macroglossum wolframmeyi Eitschberger & Treadaway, 2004

== Gallery ==
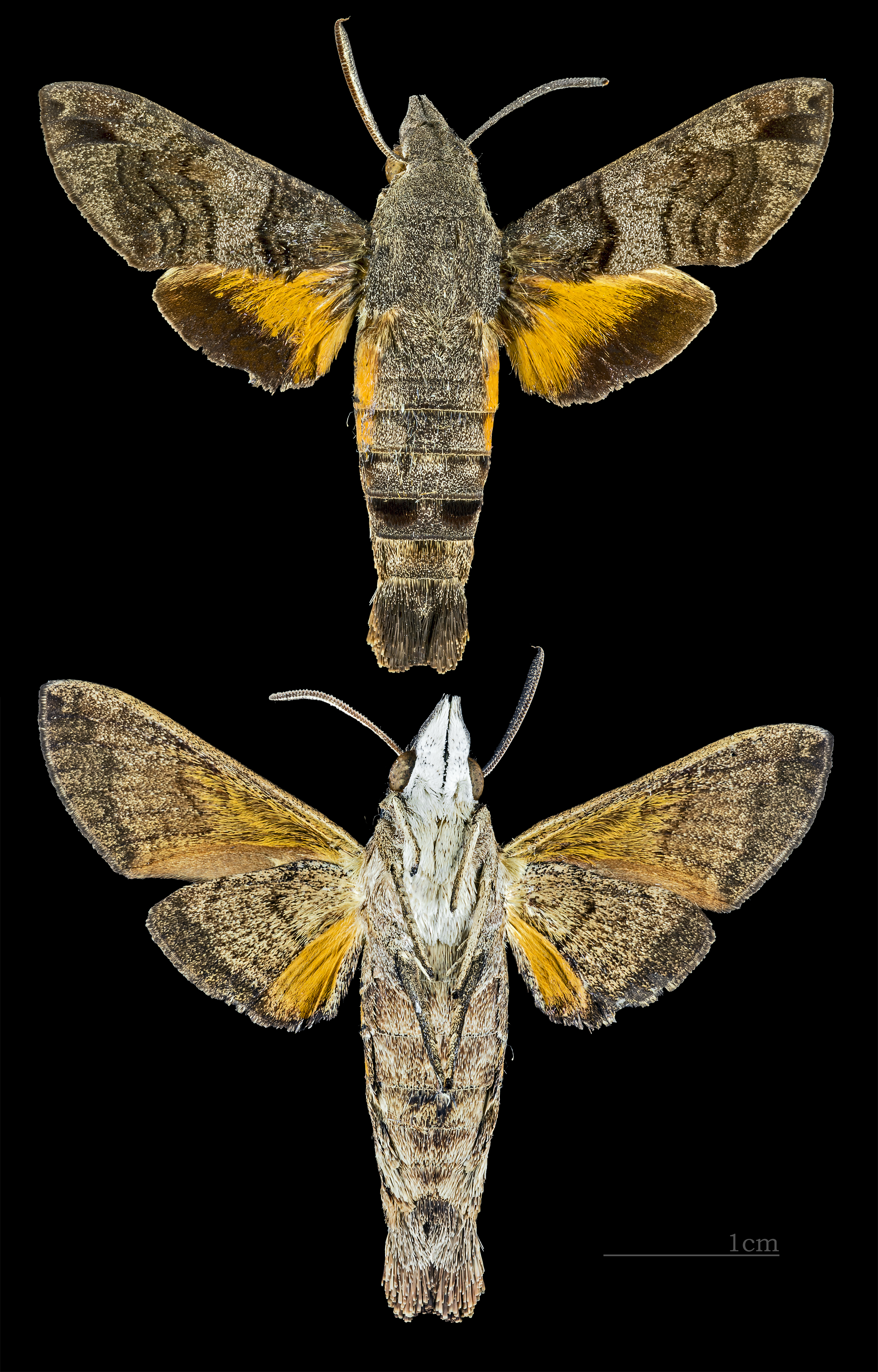
Macroglossum affictitia

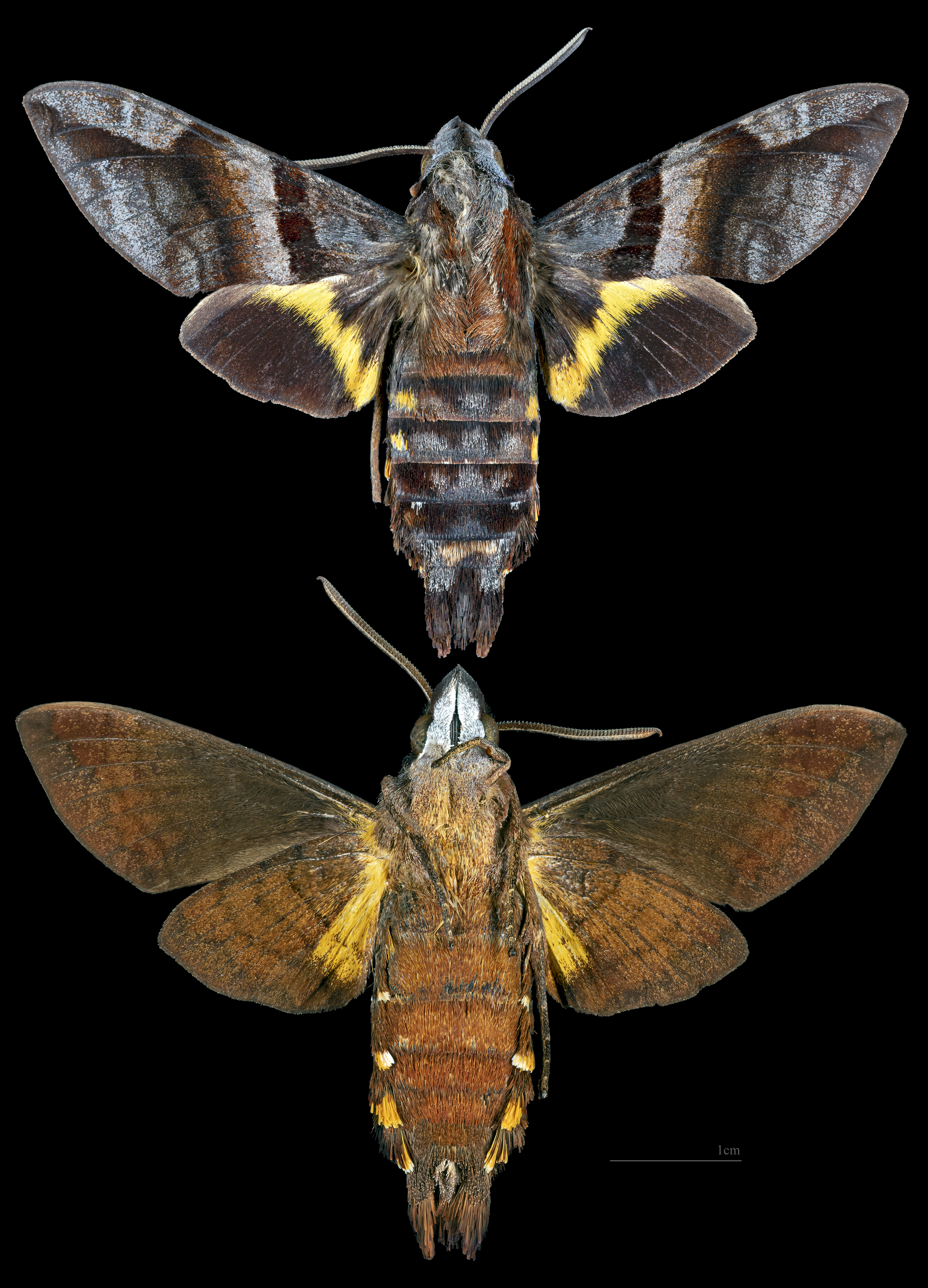
Macroglossum augarra

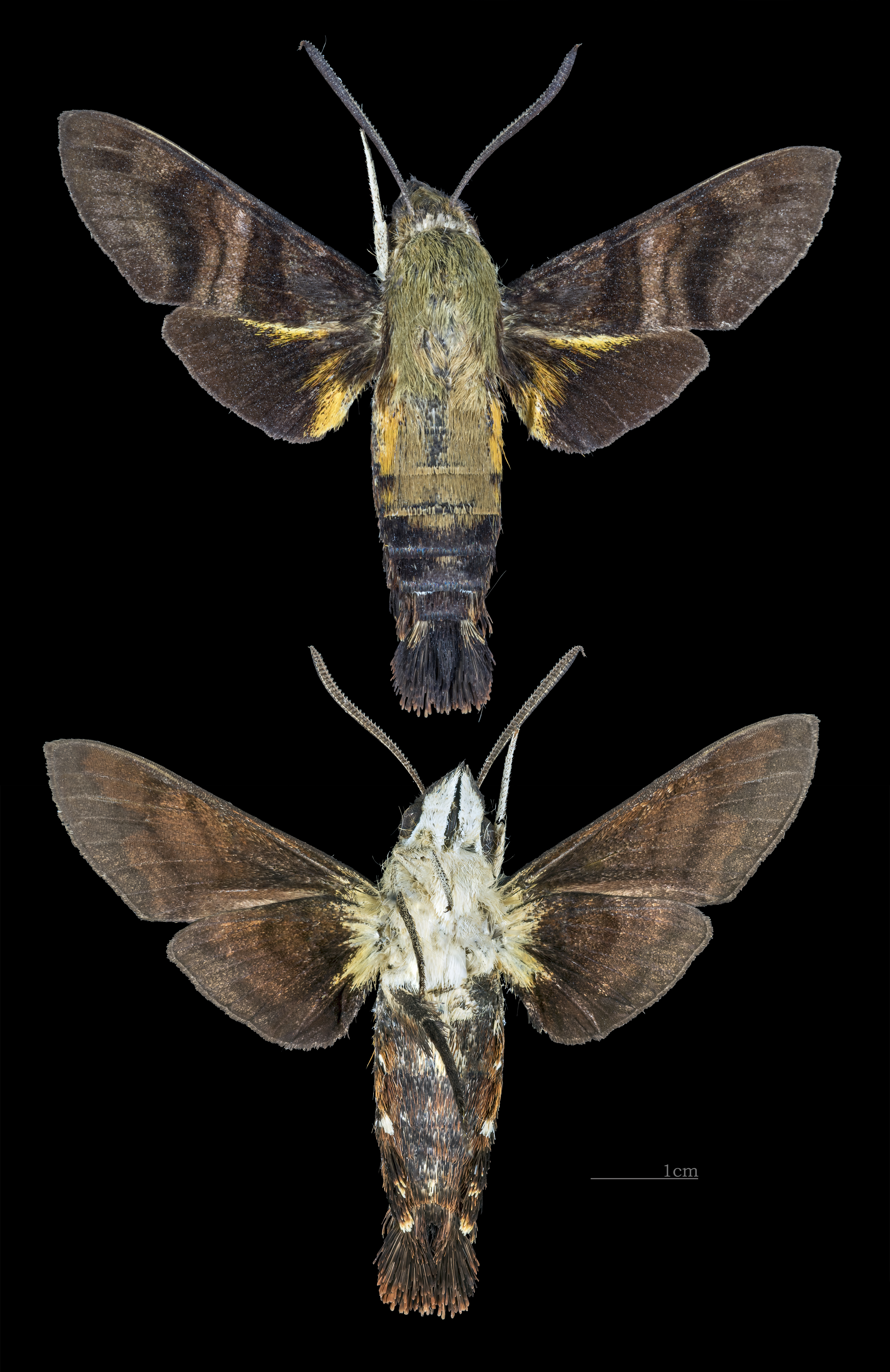
Macroglossum avicula

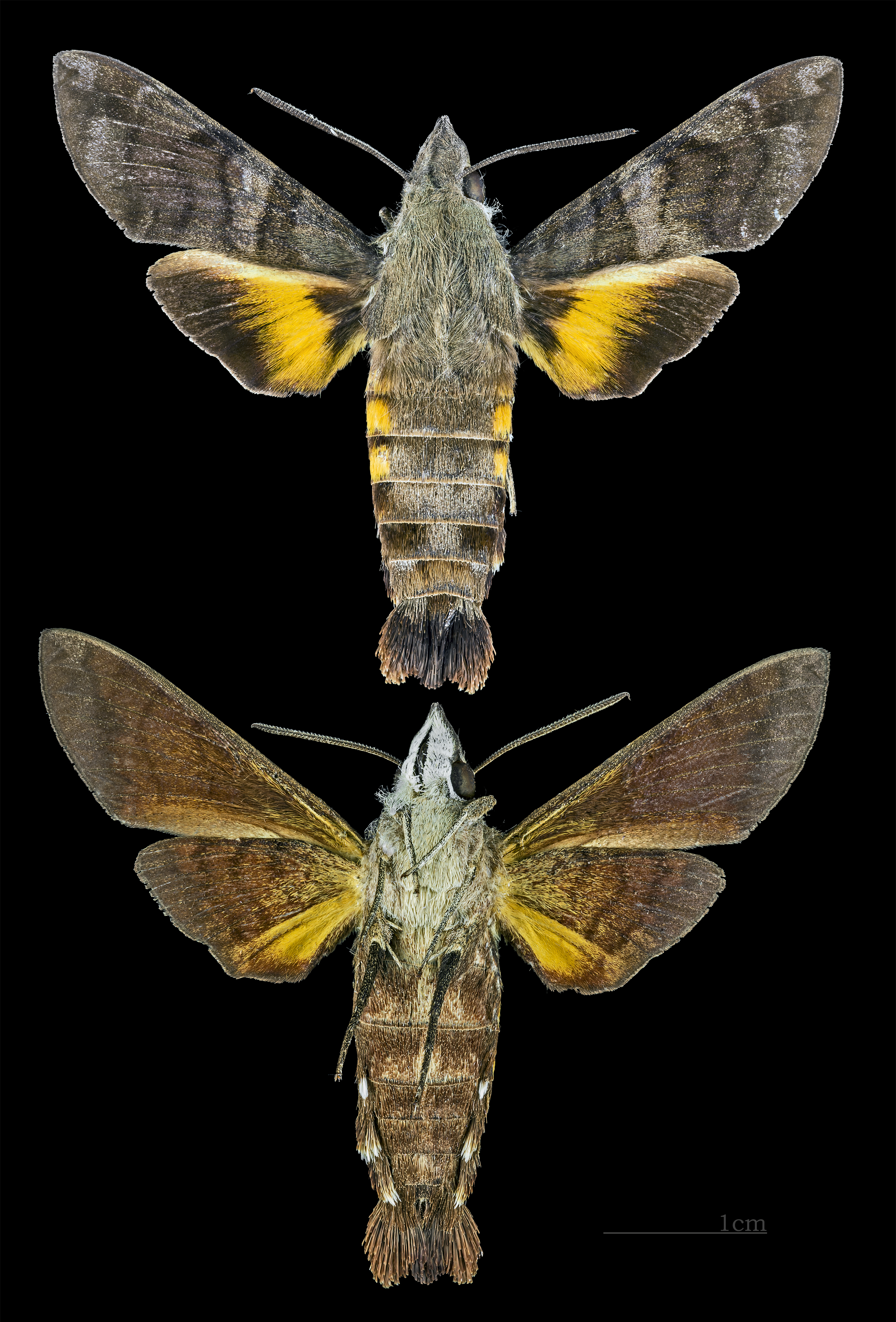
Macroglossum belis

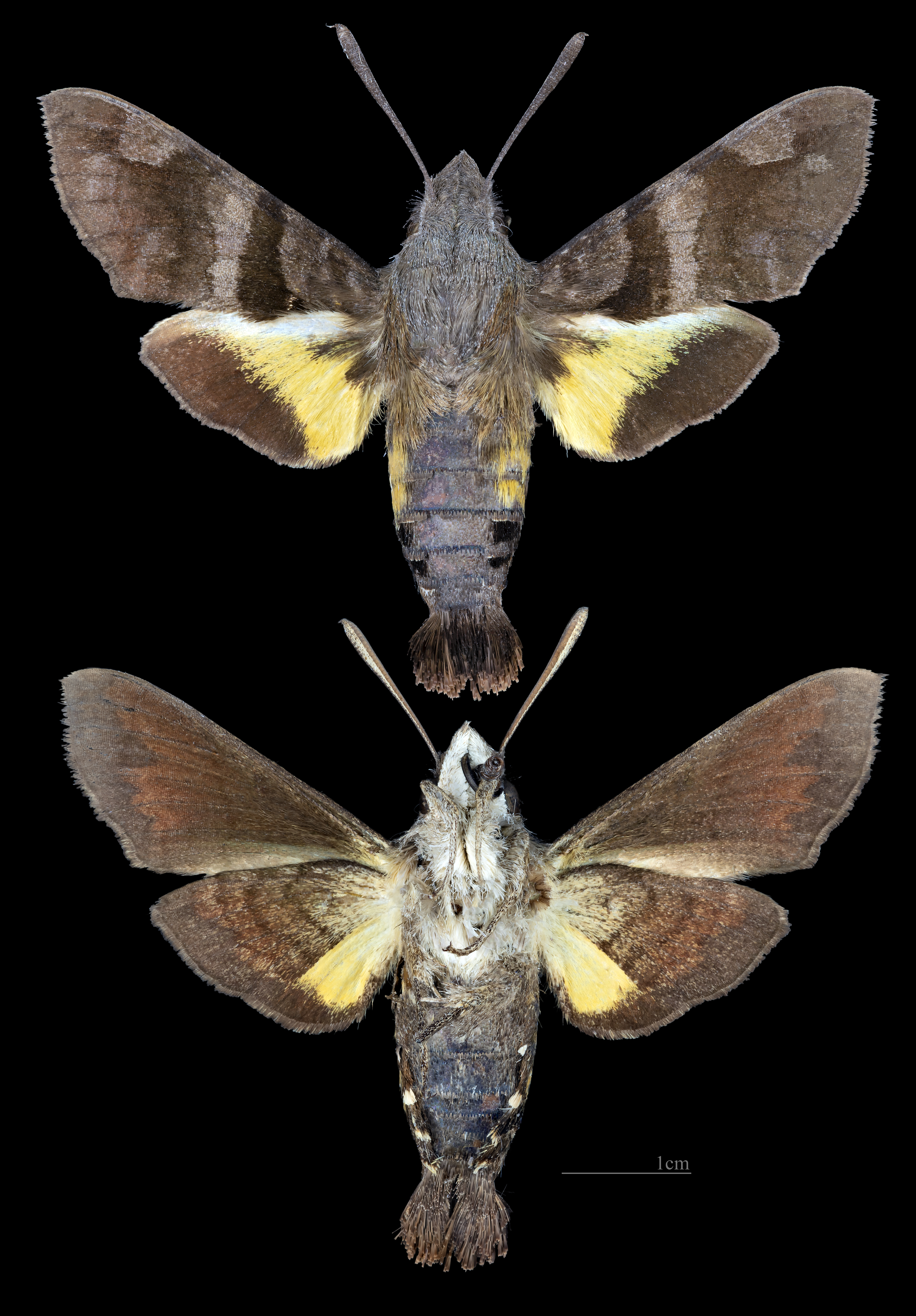
Macroglossum bifasciata

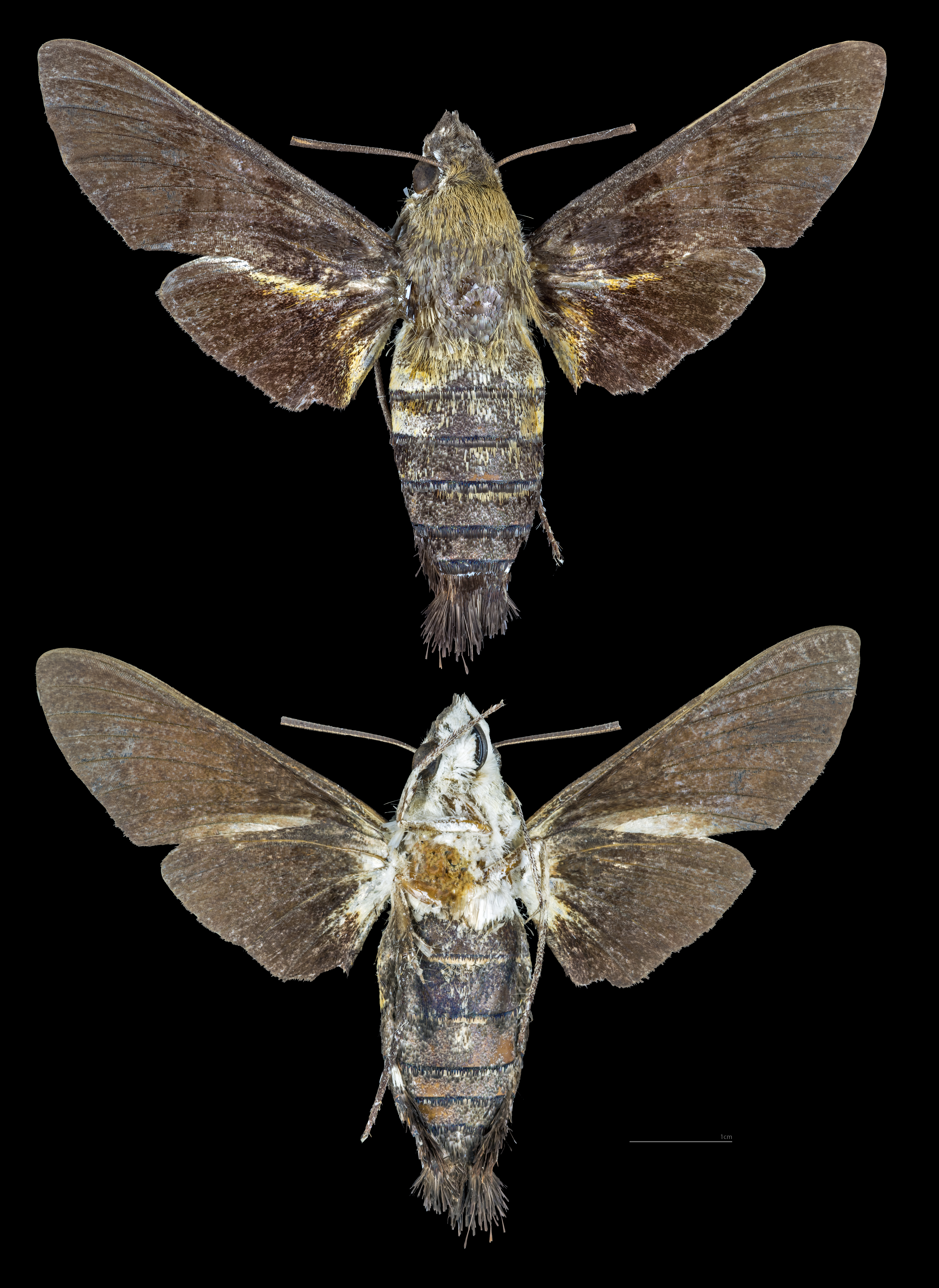
Macroglossum bombylans

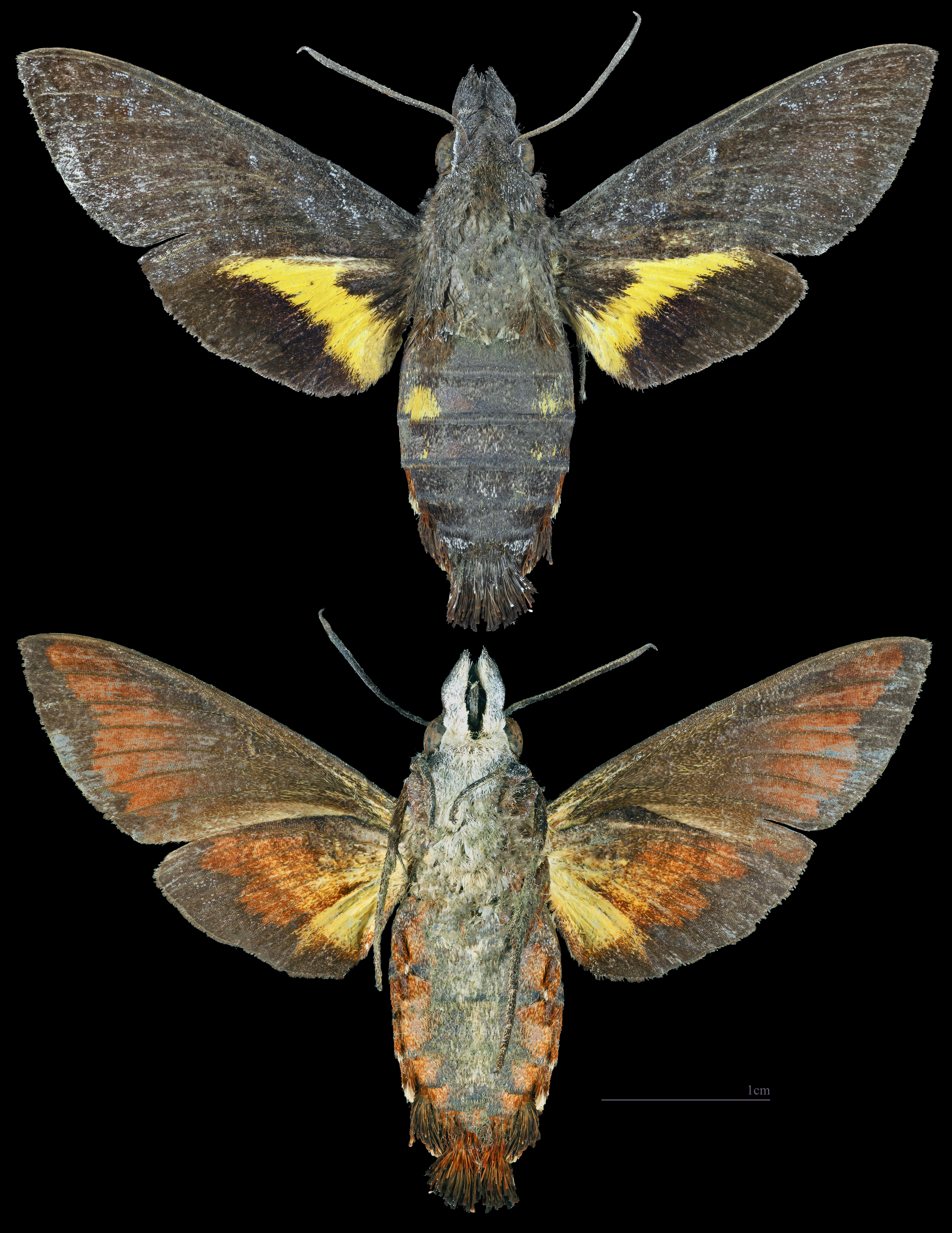
Macroglossum caldum

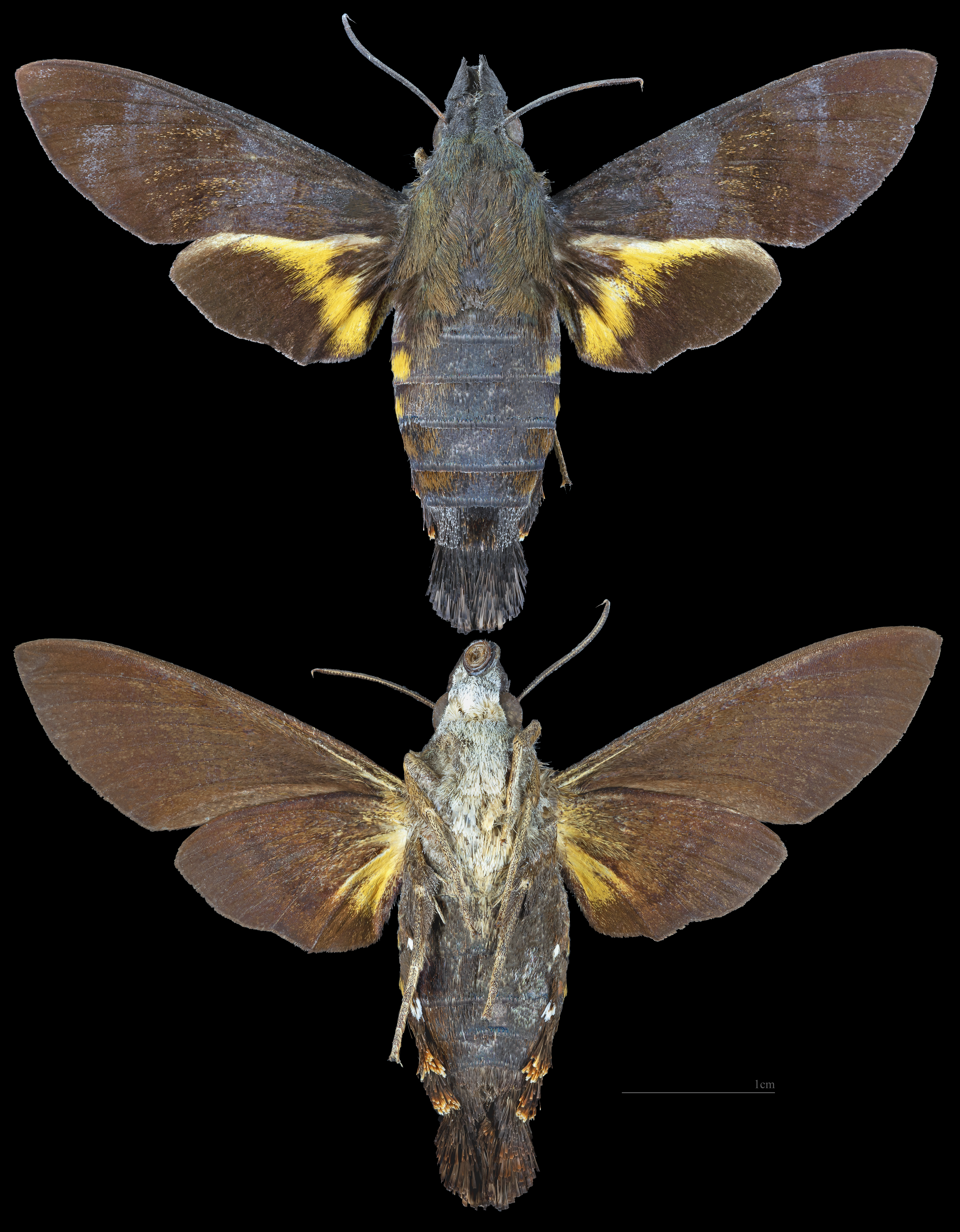
Macroglossum corythus

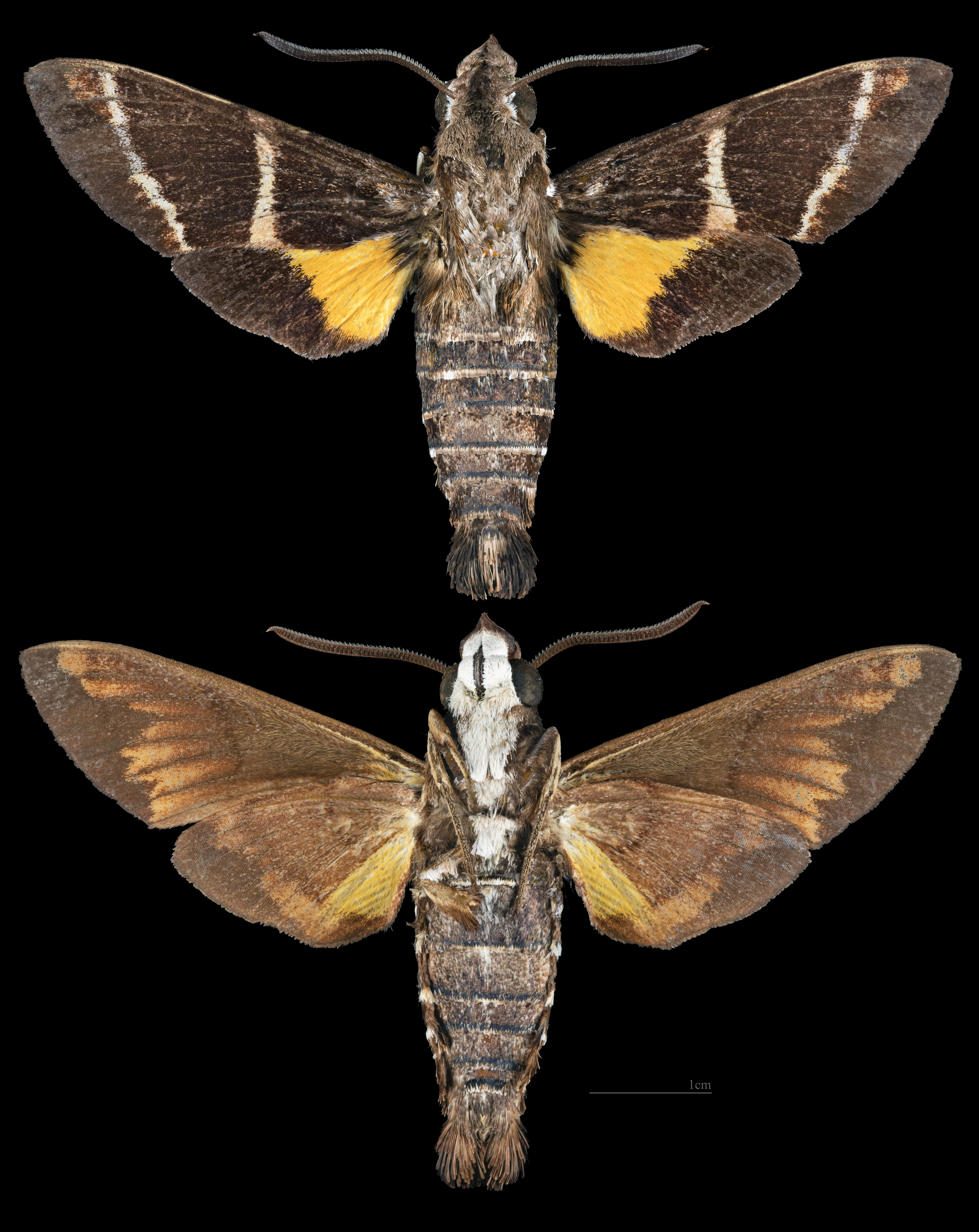
Macroglossum dohertyi

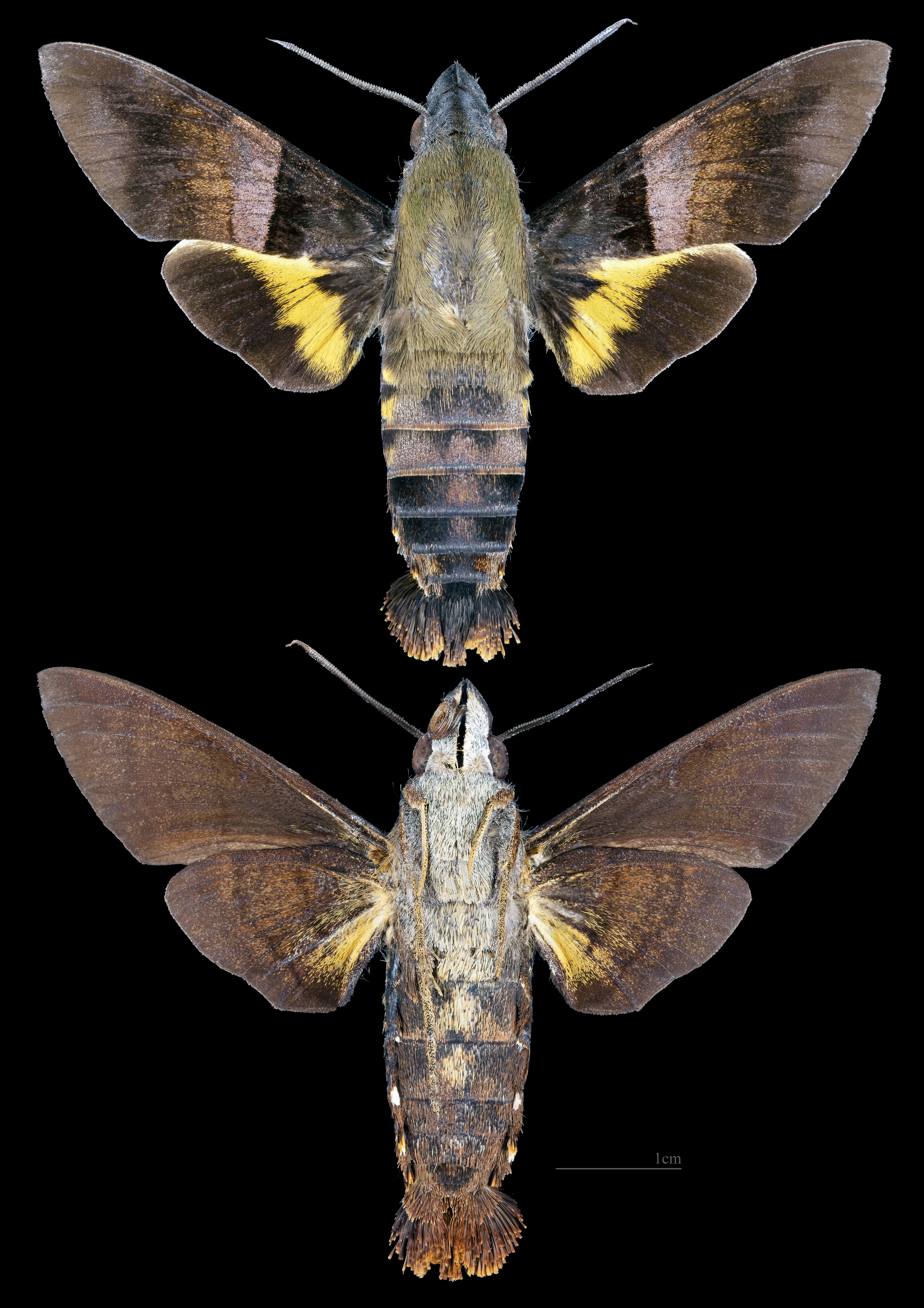
Macroglossum faro

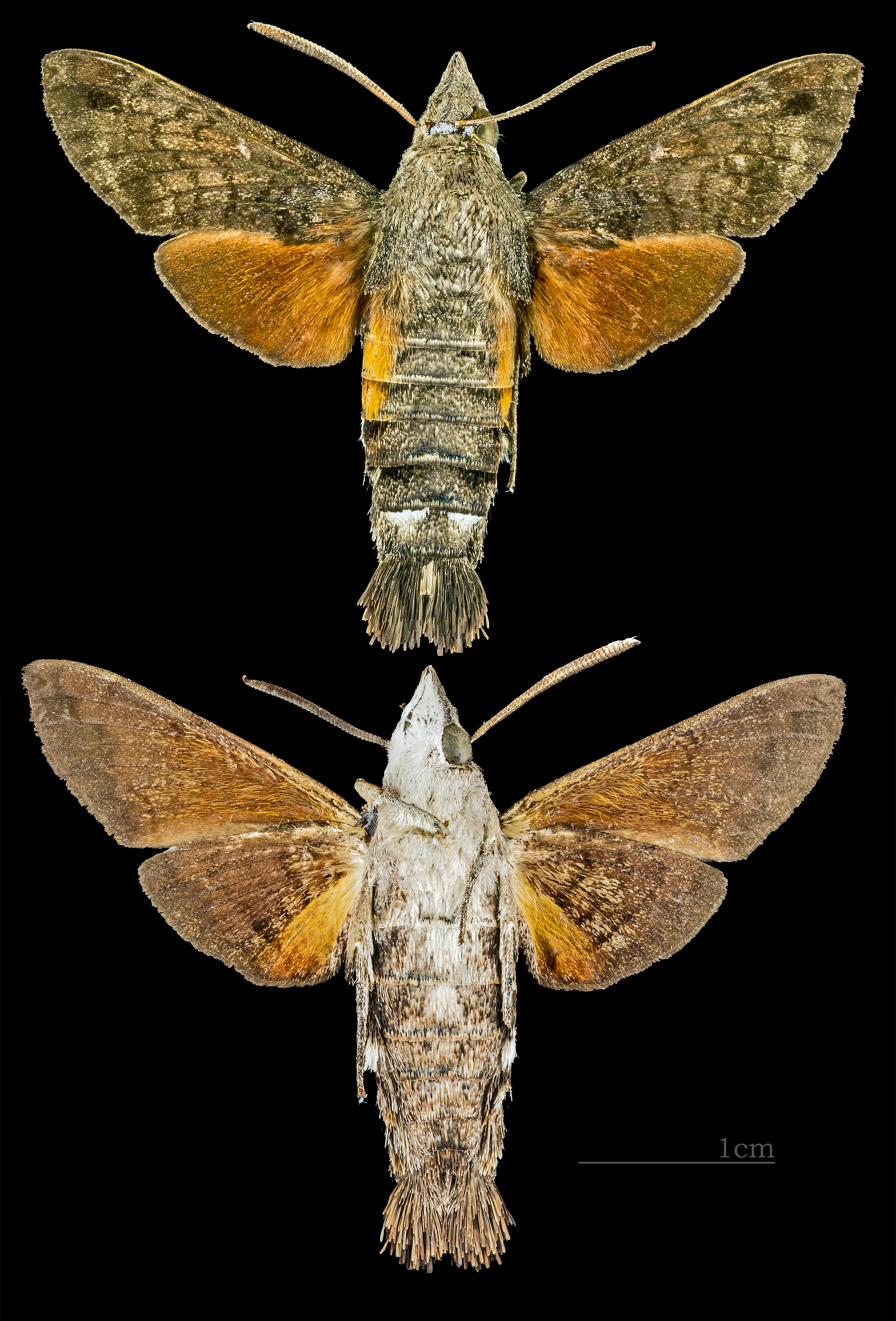
Macroglossum gyrans

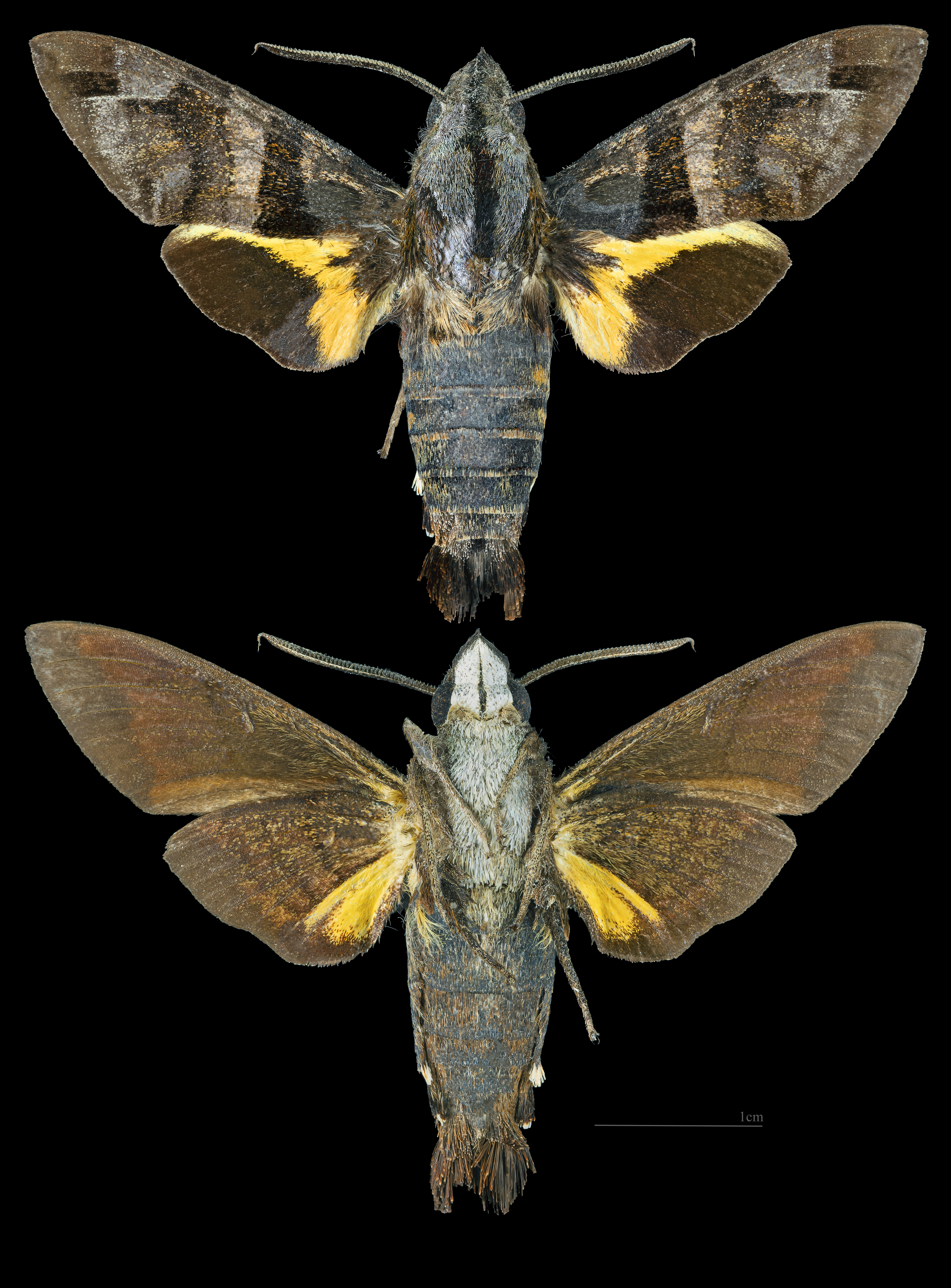
Macroglossum heliophila

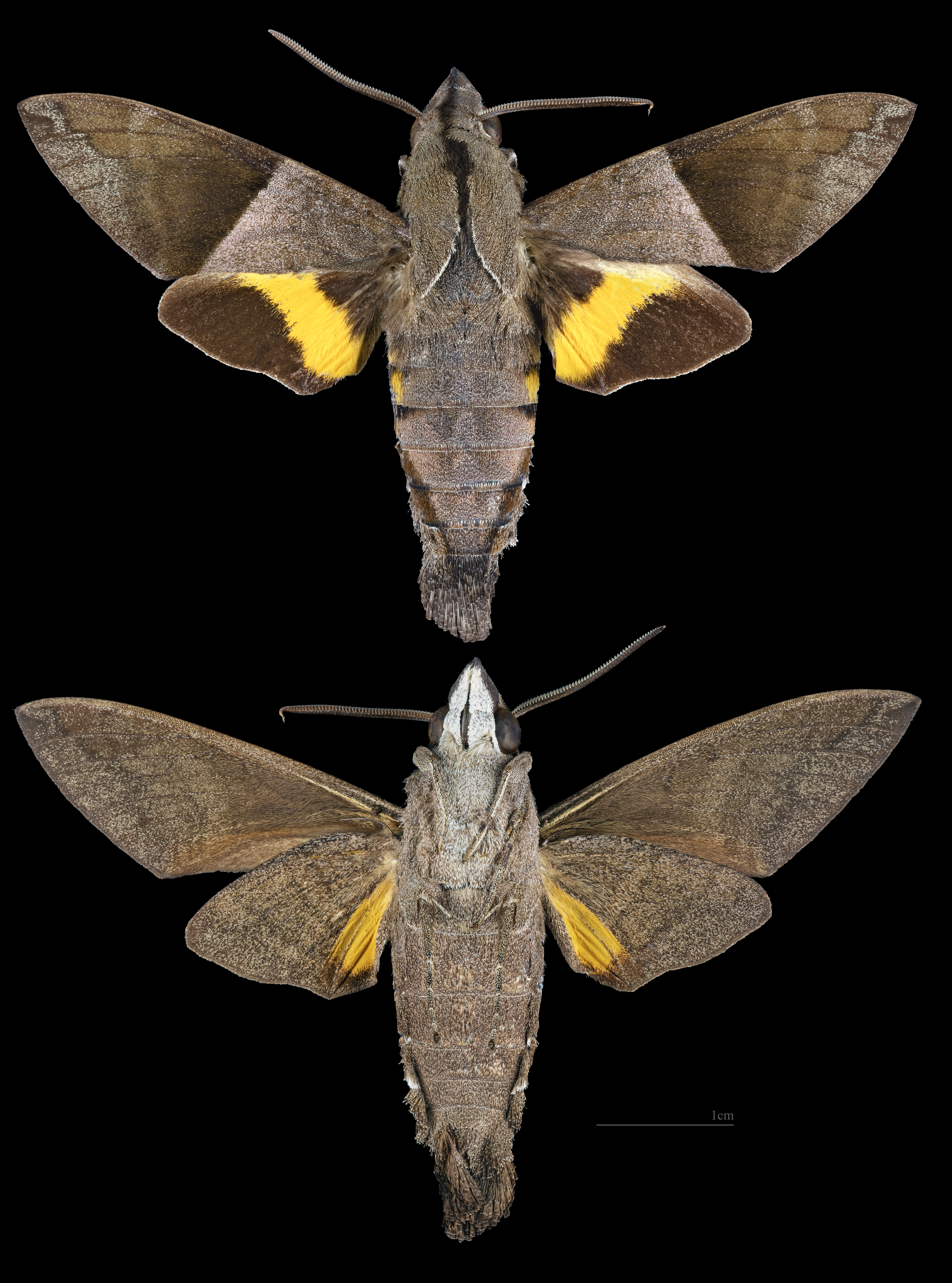
Macroglossum hemichroma

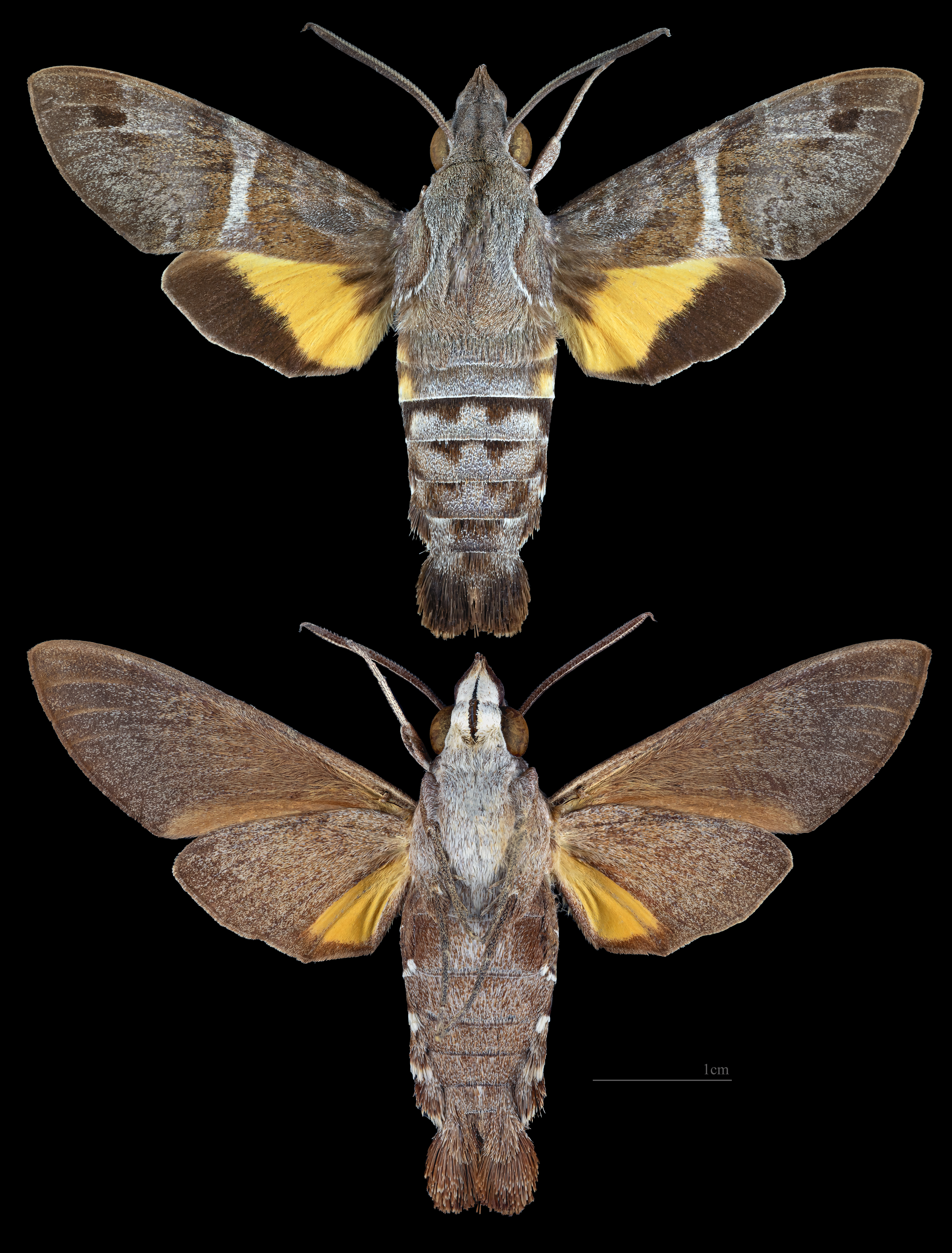
Macroglossum hirundo

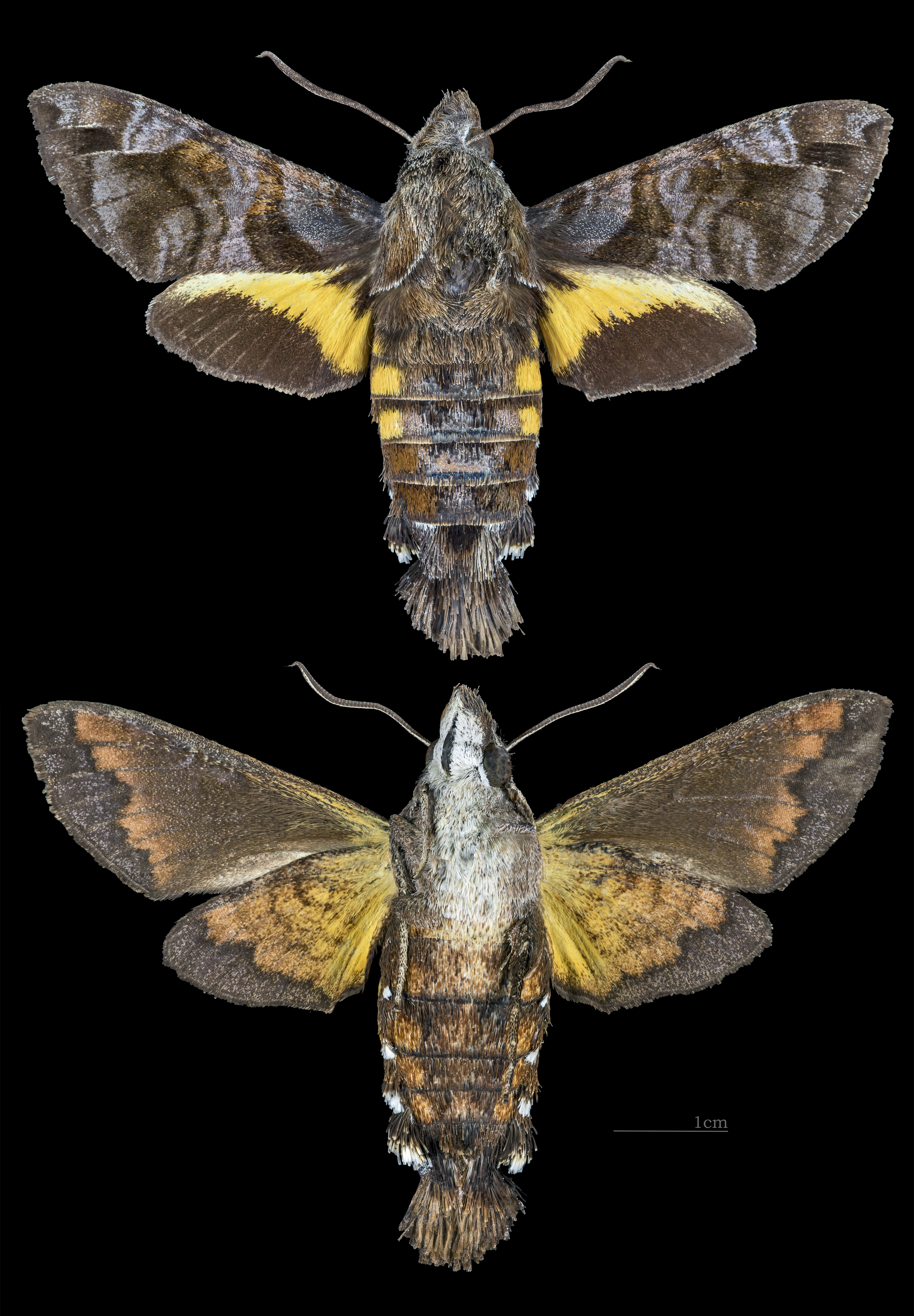
Macroglossum insipida

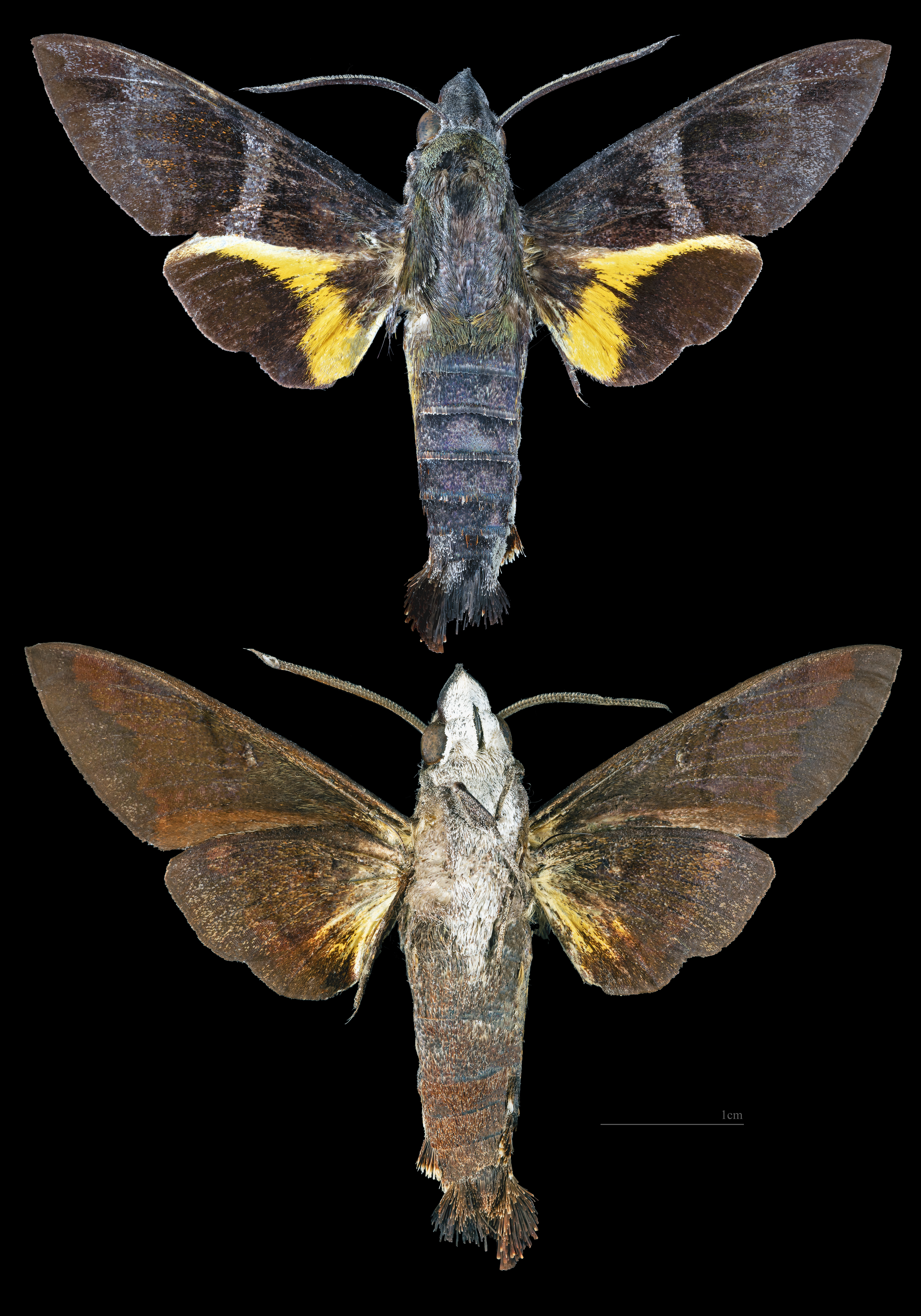
Macroglossum kitchingi

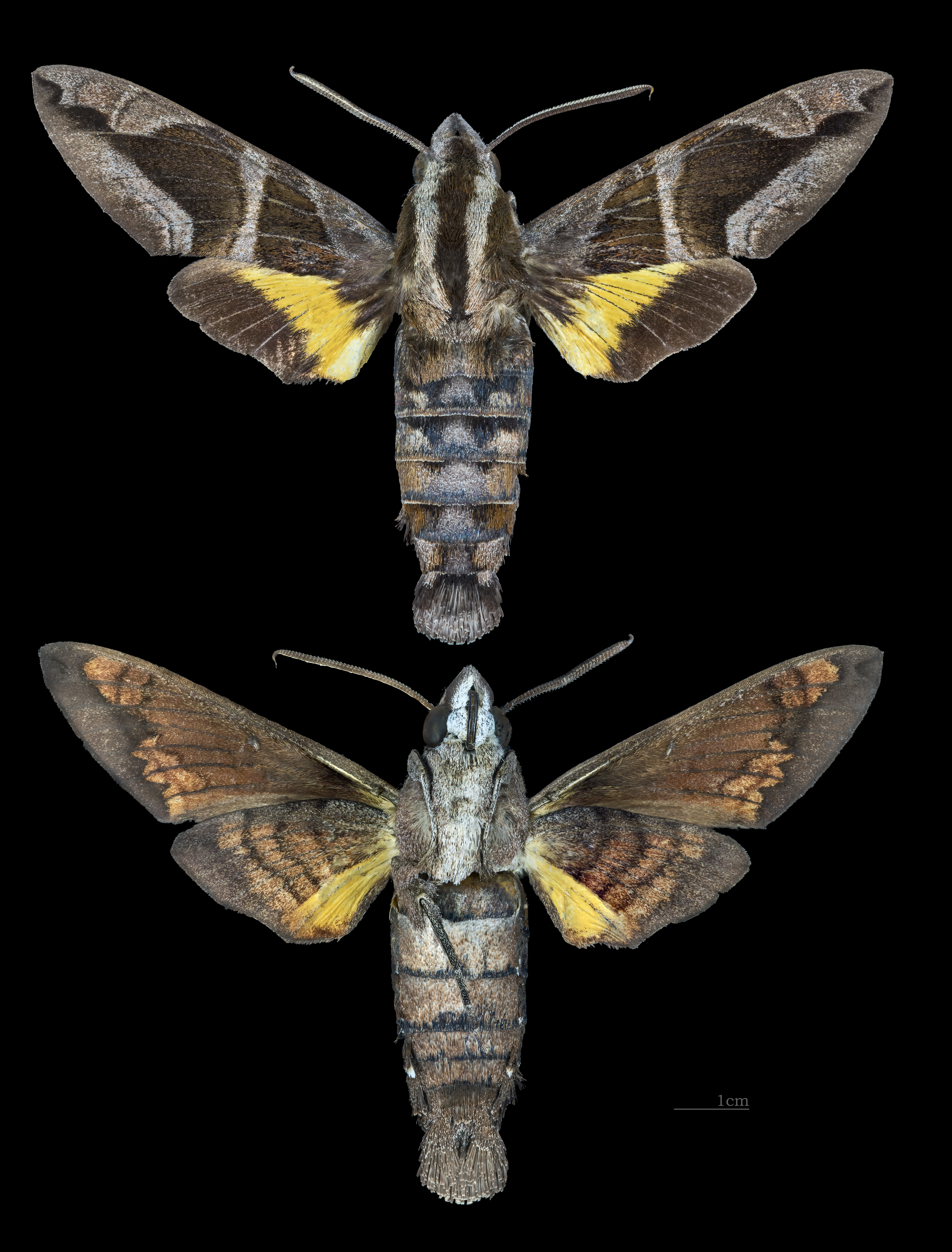
Macroglossum mitchelli

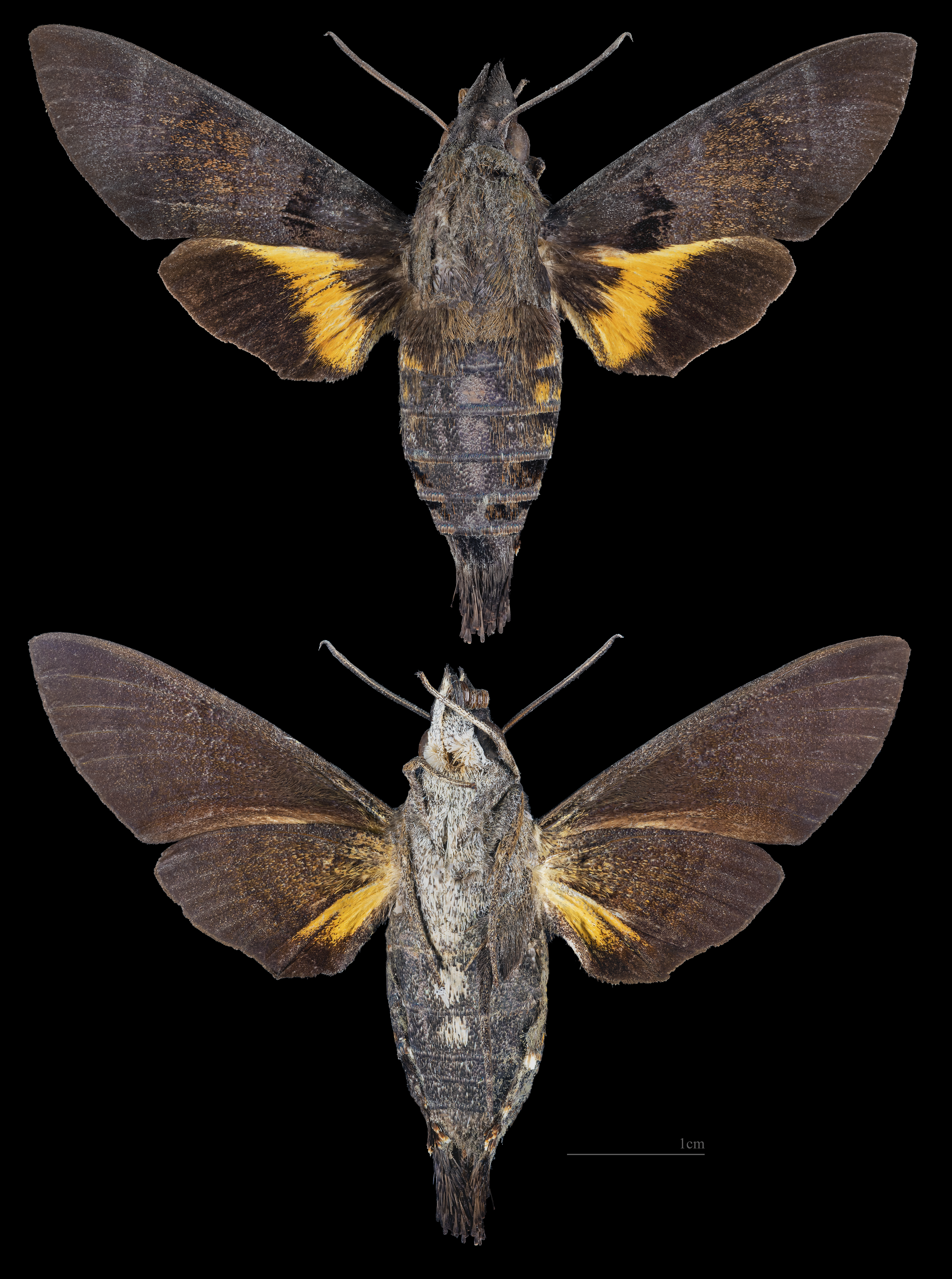
Macroglossum nigellum

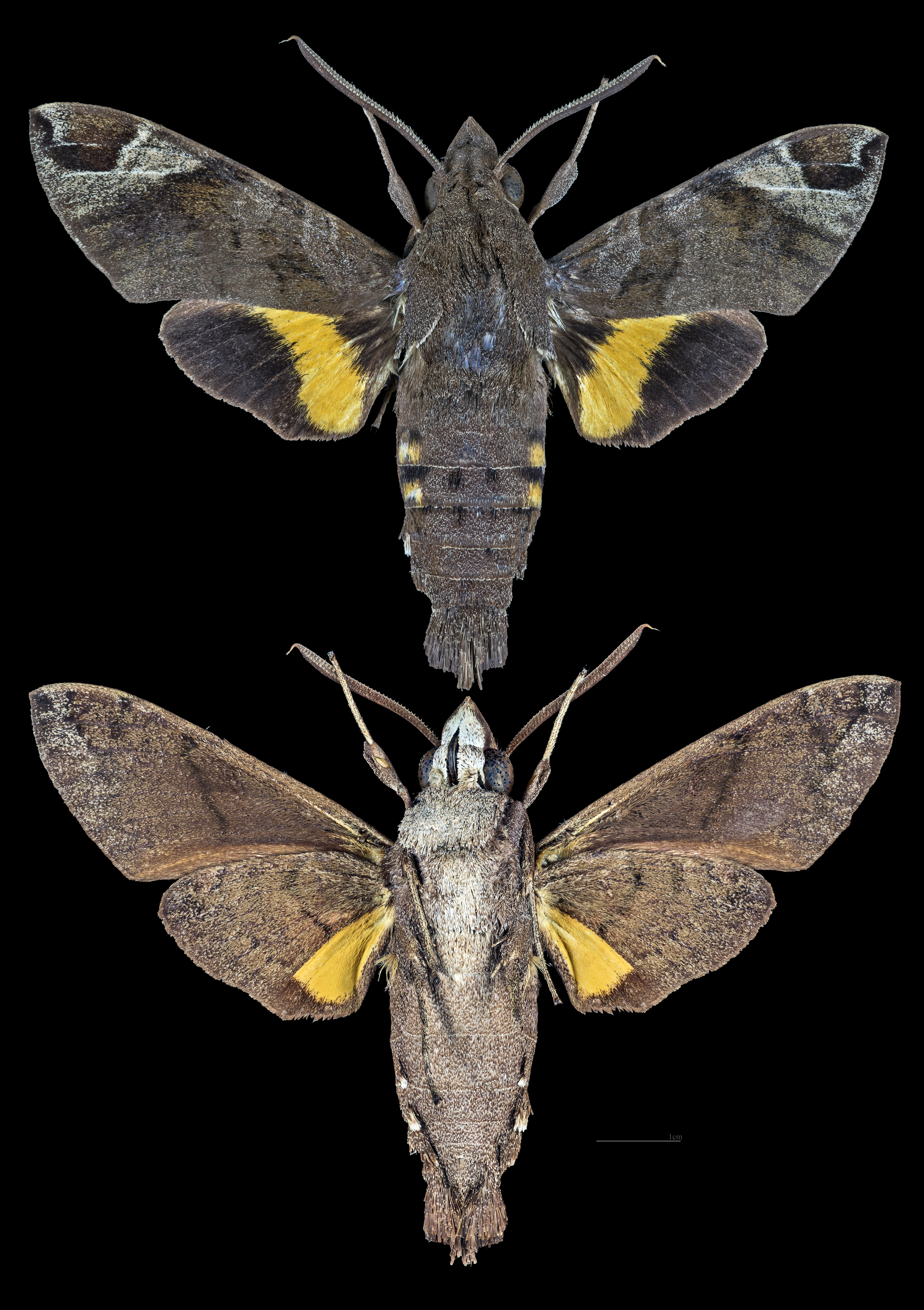
Macroglossum nubilum

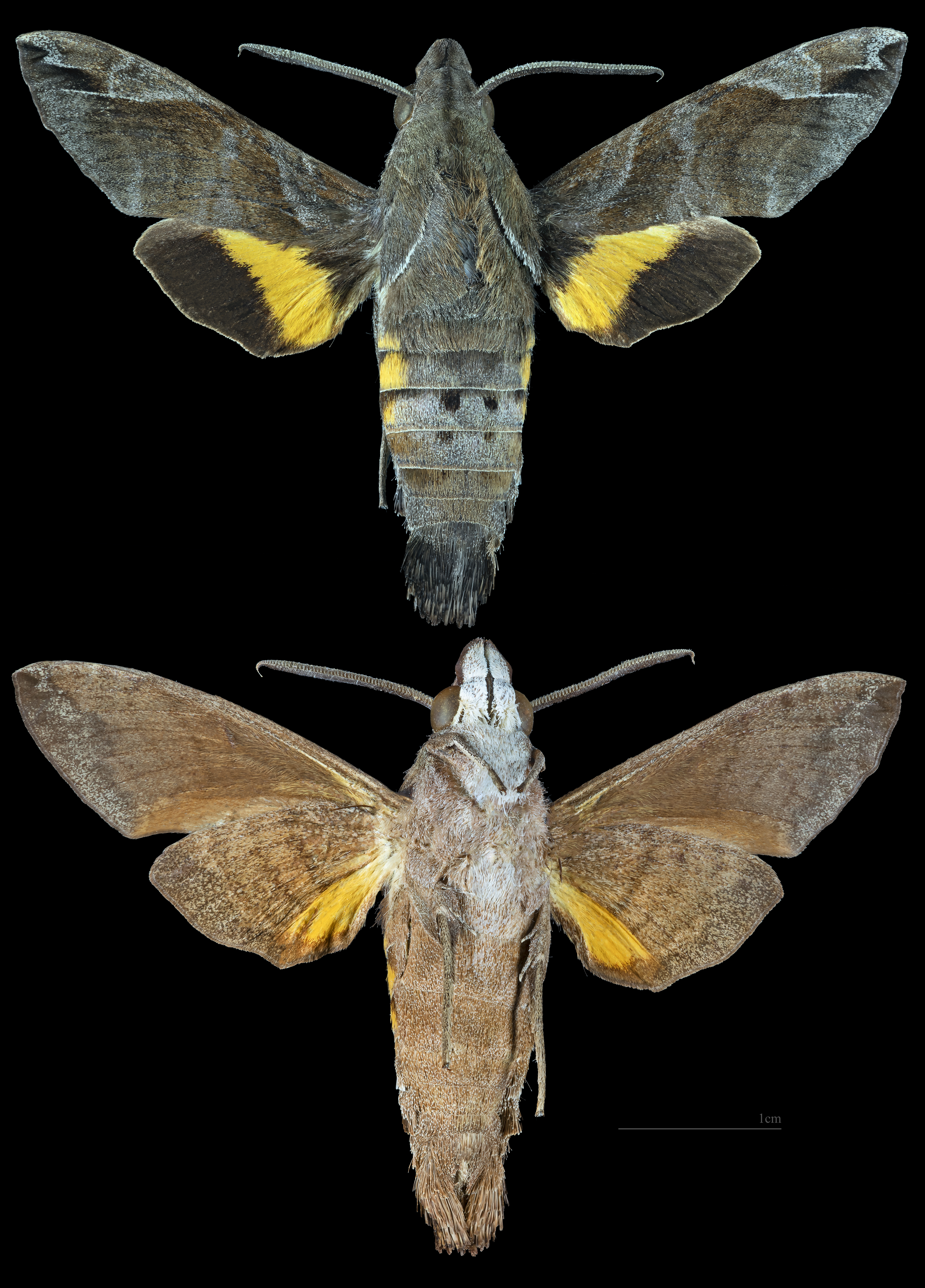
Macroglossum prometheus

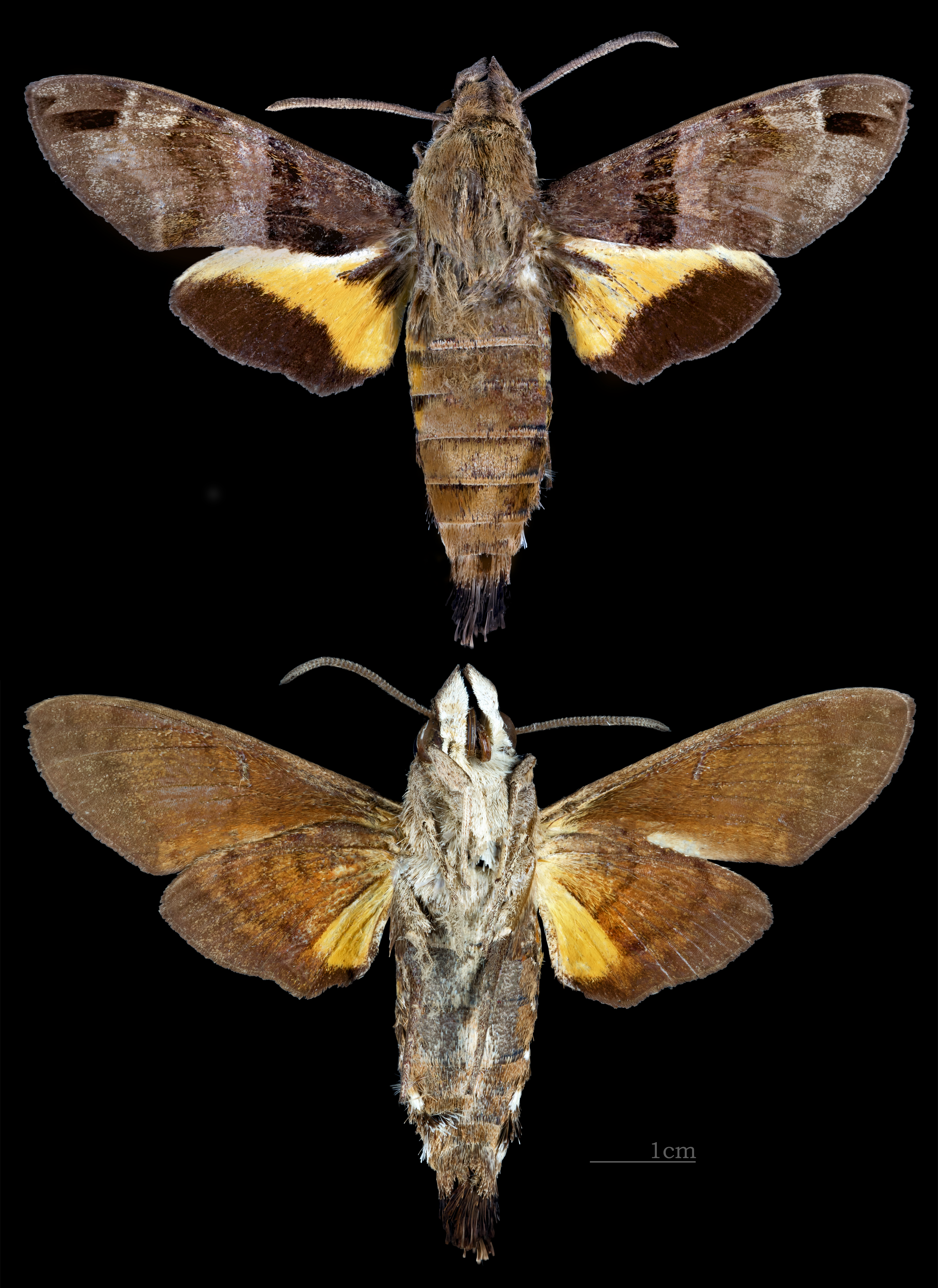
Macroglossum pyrrhosticta

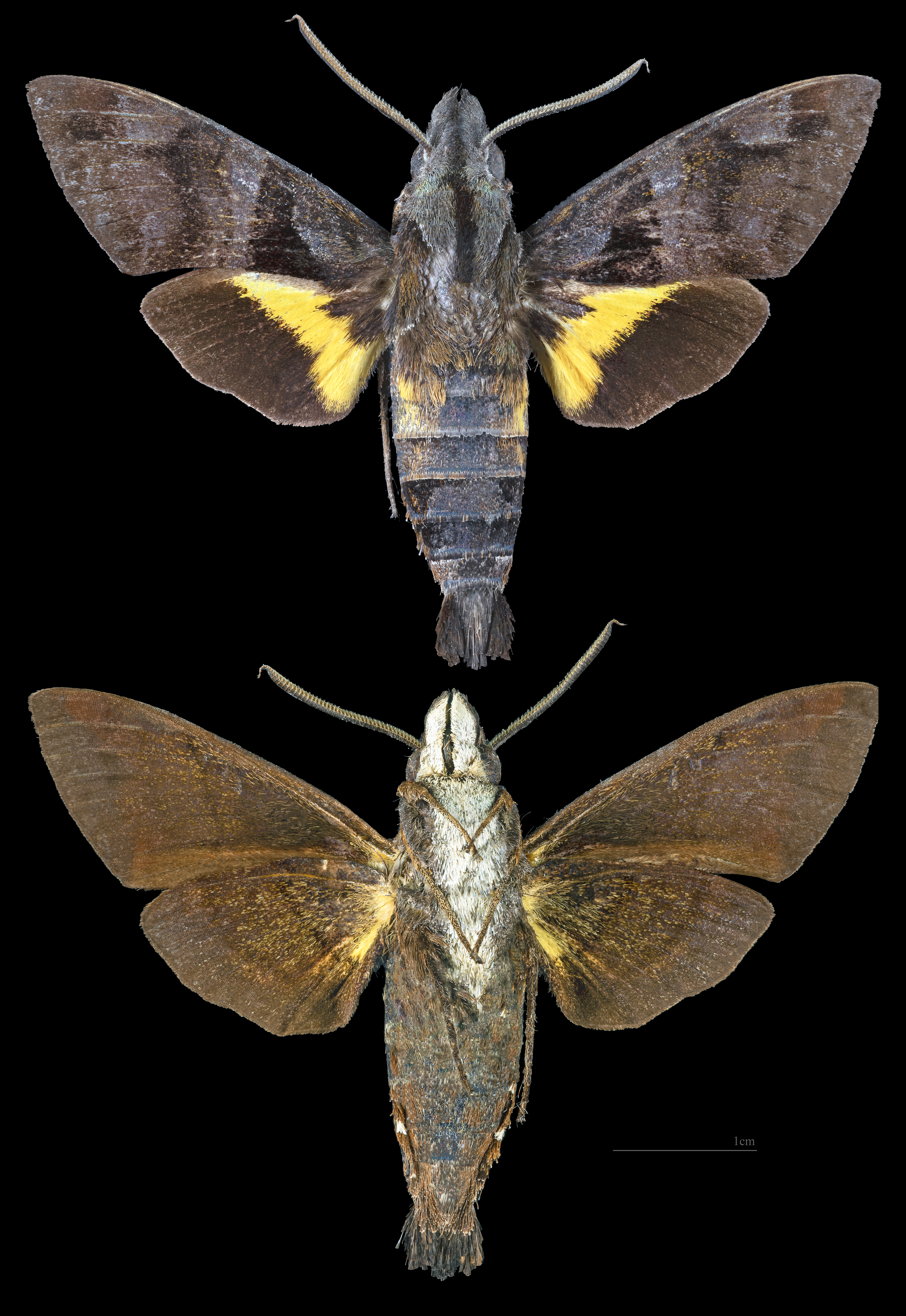
Macroglossum reithi

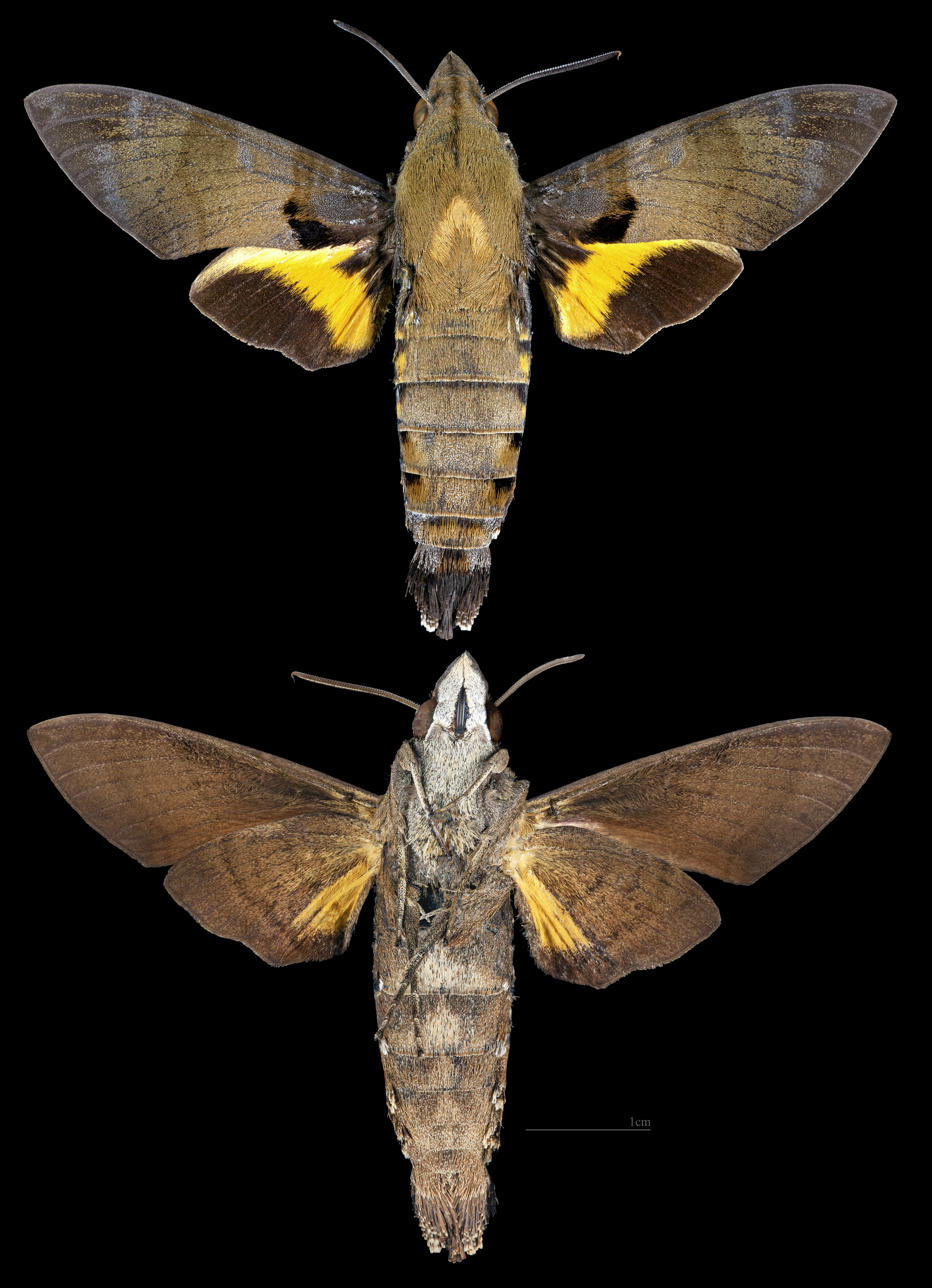
Macroglossum semifasciata

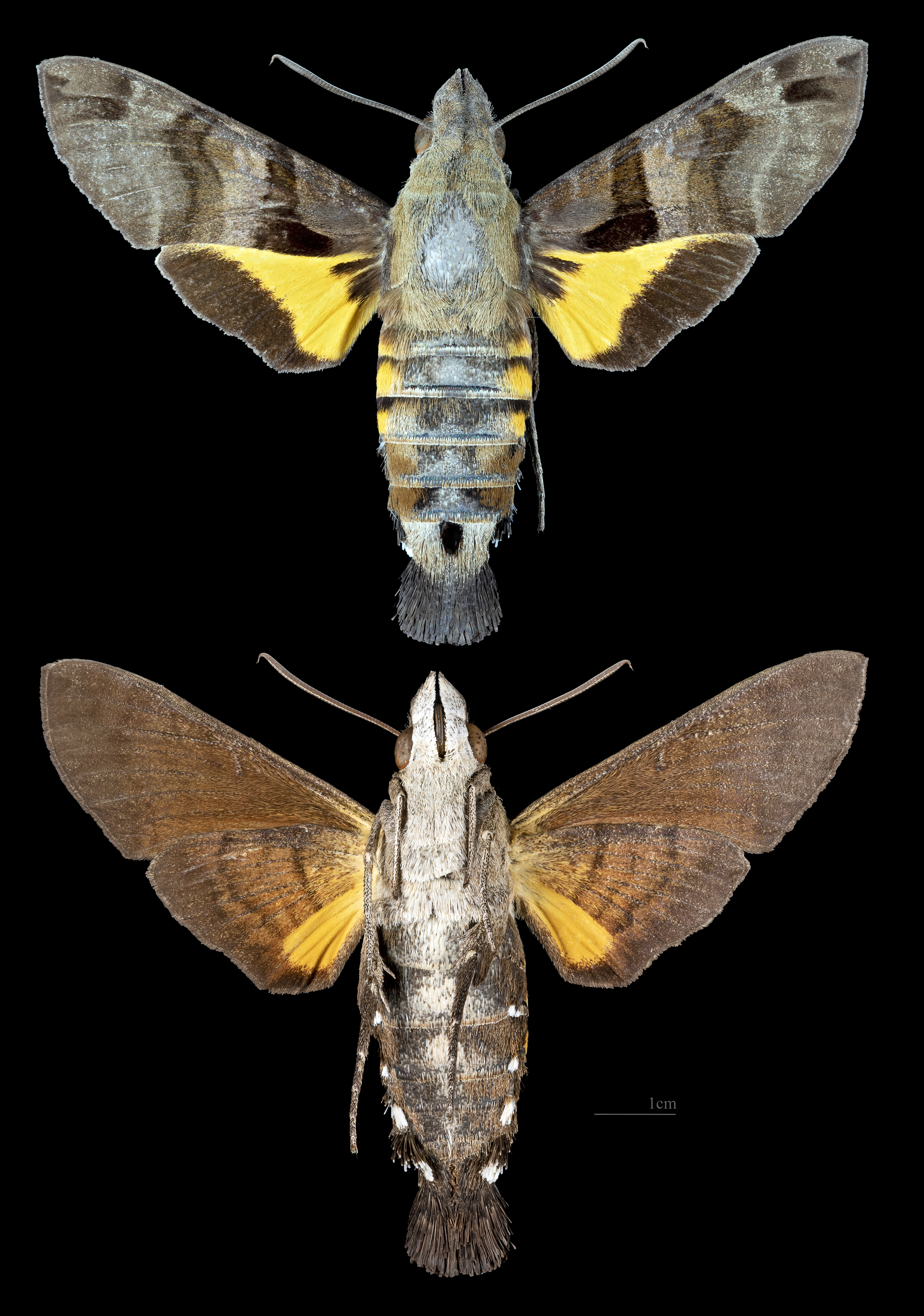
Macroglossum sitiene

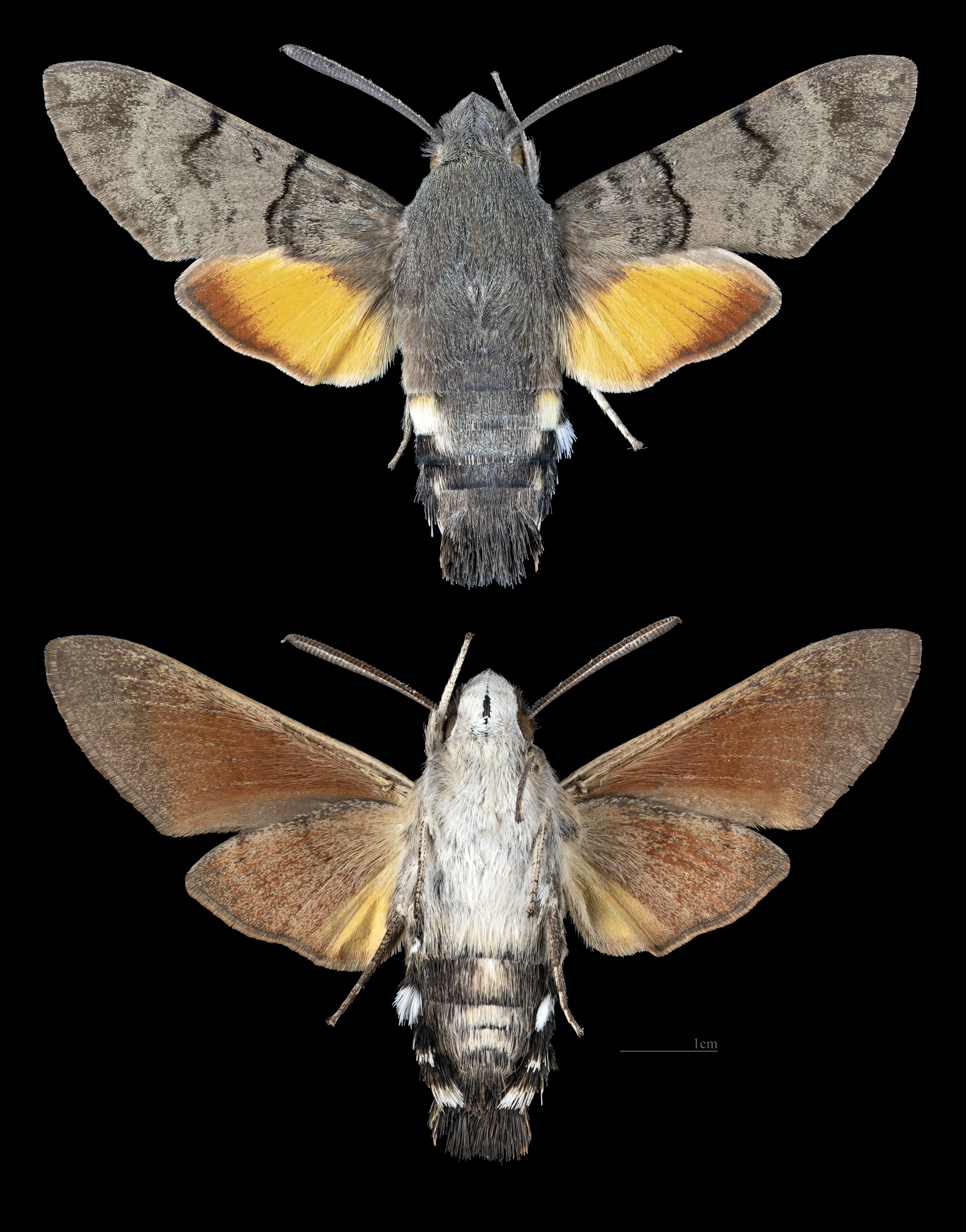
Macroglossum stellatarum

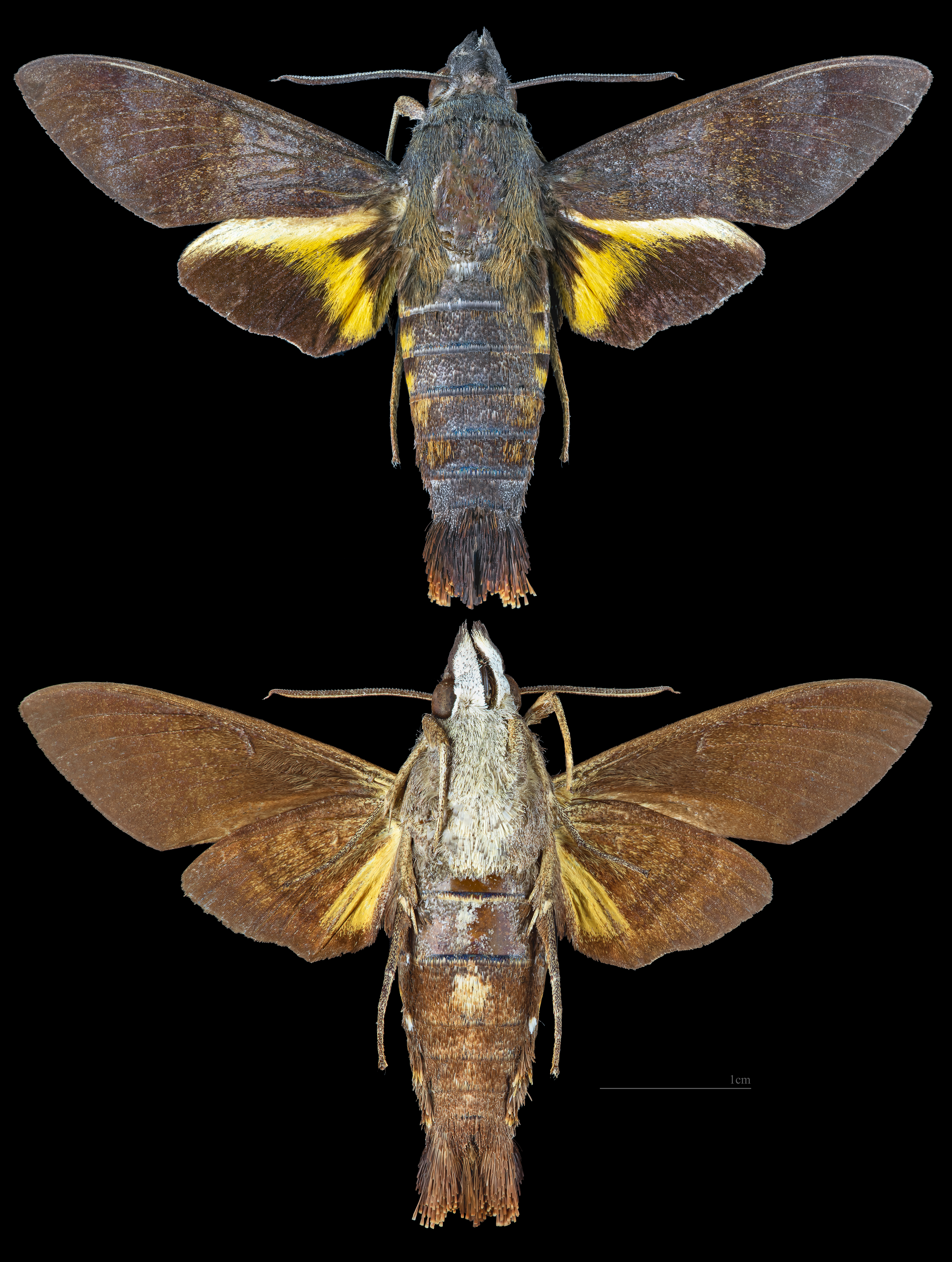
Macroglossum sylvia

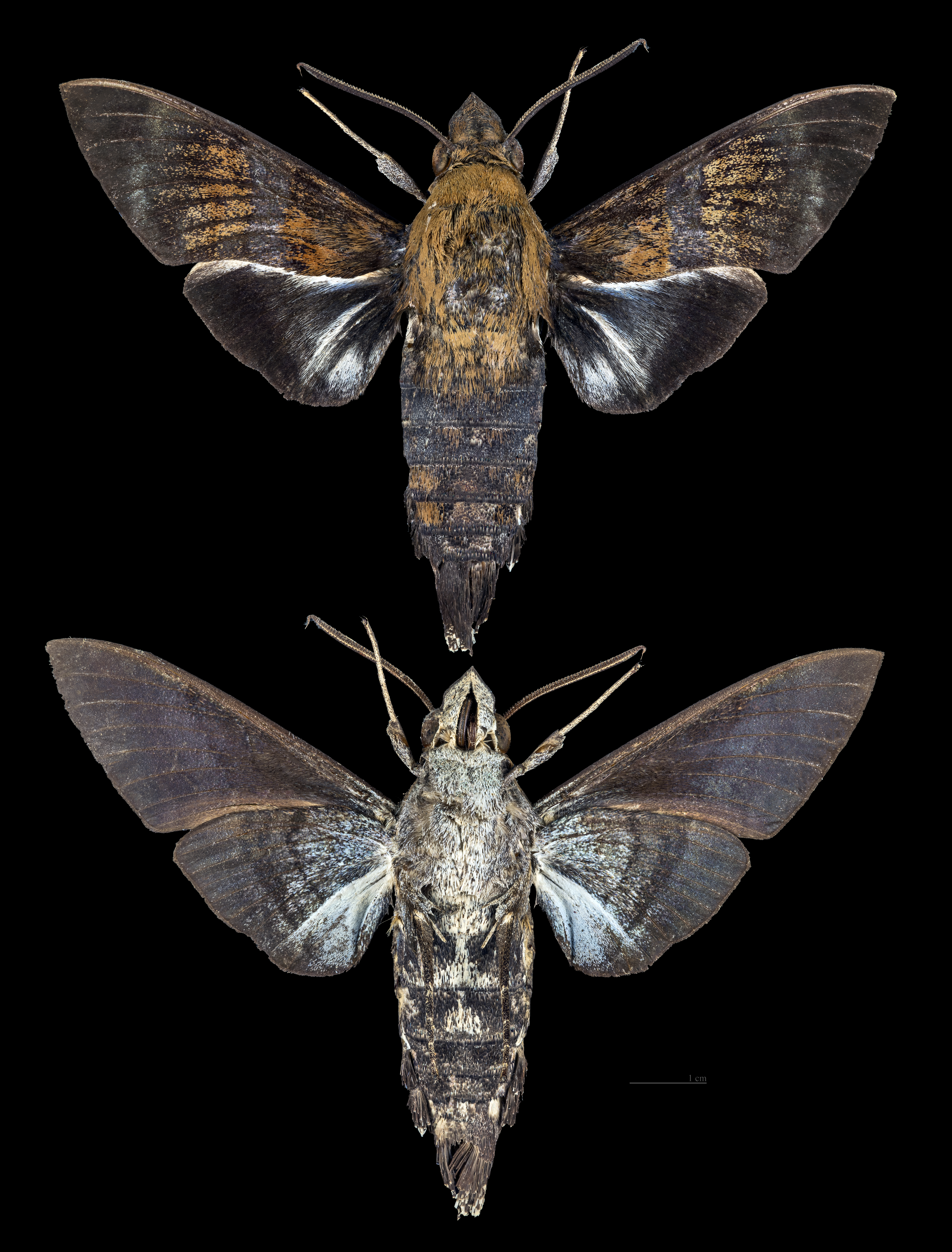
Macroglossum tenebrosa

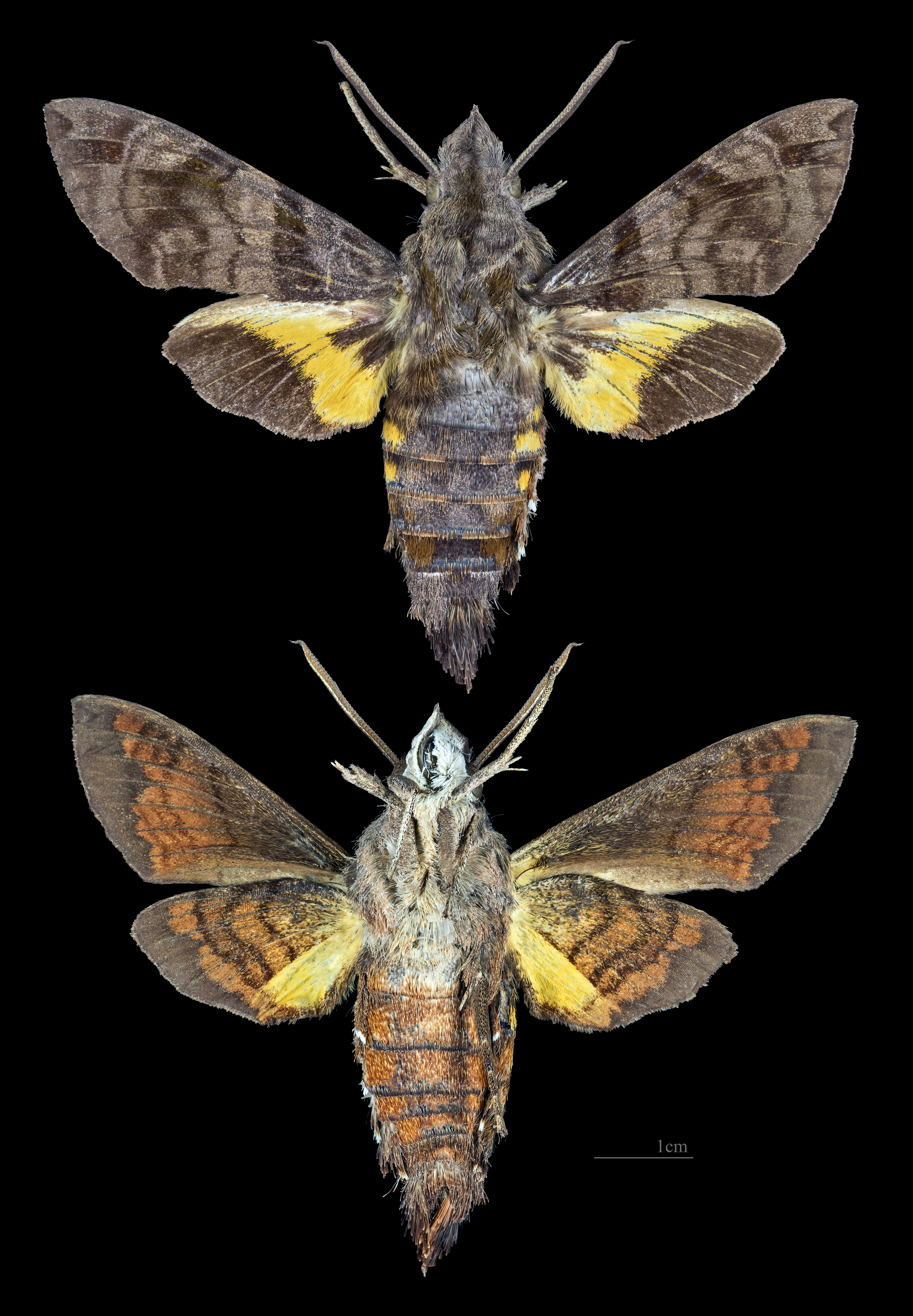
Macroglossum ungues
