= Macroglossum eggeri =

Scientific classification
- Kingdom: Animalia
- Phylum: Arthropoda
- Class: Insecta
- Order: Lepidoptera
- Family: Sphingidae
- Genus: Macroglossum
- Species: M. eggeri

Binomial name
- Macroglossum eggeri Eitschberger, 2003

Species of moth

Macroglossum eggeri is a moth of the family Sphingidae. It is known from Sulawesi.
