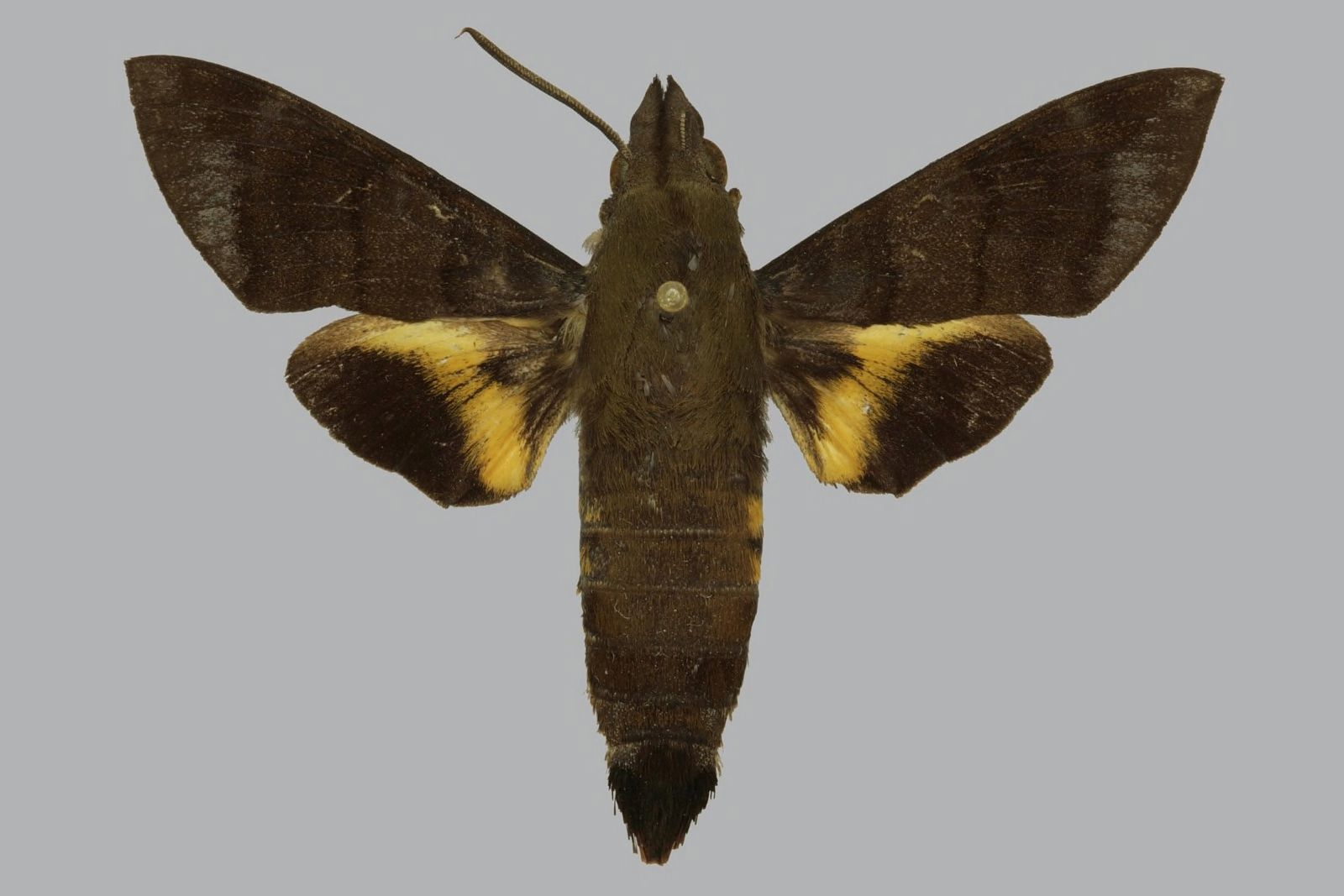

Scientific classification
- Kingdom: Animalia
- Phylum: Arthropoda
- Class: Insecta
- Order: Lepidoptera
- Family: Sphingidae
- Genus: Macroglossum
- Species: M. sulai

Binomial name
- Macroglossum sulai Eitschberger, 2003

= Macroglossum sulai =

Species of moth

Macroglossum sulai is a moth of the family Sphingidae. It is known from Sulawesi.
