= Macroglossum kleineri =

Scientific classification
- Kingdom: Animalia
- Phylum: Arthropoda
- Class: Insecta
- Order: Lepidoptera
- Family: Sphingidae
- Genus: Macroglossum
- Species: M. kleineri

Binomial name
- Macroglossum kleineri Eitschberger, 2006

Species of moth

Macroglossum kleineri is a moth of the family Sphingidae which is endemic to Sulawesi.
