= Macroglossum backi =

Scientific classification
- Kingdom: Animalia
- Phylum: Arthropoda
- Class: Insecta
- Order: Lepidoptera
- Family: Sphingidae
- Genus: Macroglossum
- Species: M. backi

Binomial name
- Macroglossum backi Eitschberger, 2009

Species of moth

Macroglossum backi is a moth of the family Sphingidae, currently believed to be synonymous with Macroglossum vacillans. It is known from Papua New Guinea.
