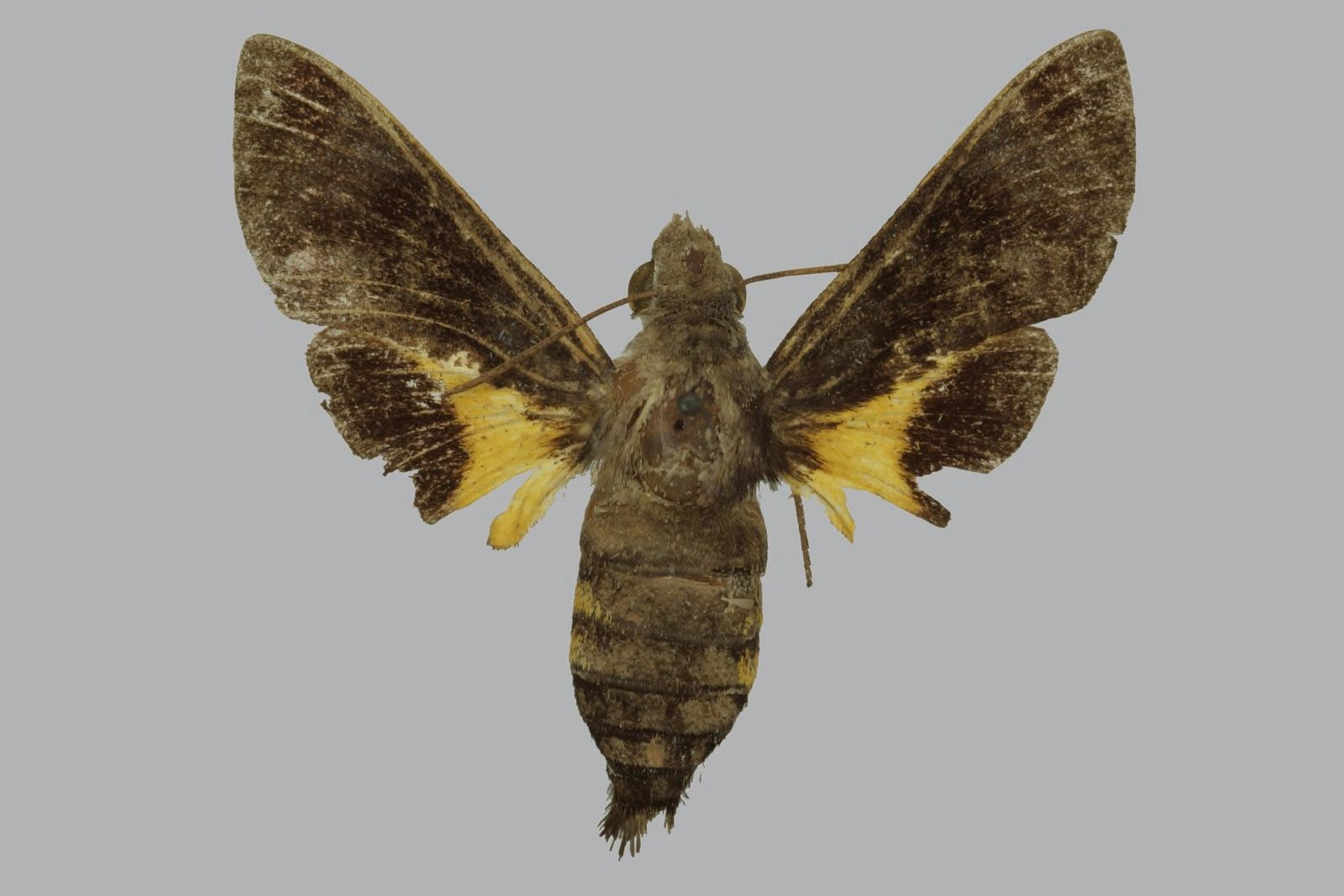
- Female museum specimen

Scientific classification
- Kingdom: Animalia
- Phylum: Arthropoda
- Class: Insecta
- Order: Lepidoptera
- Family: Sphingidae
- Genus: Macroglossum
- Species: M. castaneum

Binomial name
- Macroglossum castaneum Rothschild & Jordan, 1903

= Macroglossum castaneum =

Species of moth

Macroglossum castaneum is a moth of the family Sphingidae. It is known from the Solomon Islands.

The upperside is generally brownish black, but the head and anterior part of the thorax are olive green, and the posterior abdominal segments are somewhat chestnut. The abdomen has two restricted yellow side patches. The palpus underside is grey and much speckled with brown. The thorax underside is olive green and the abdomen underside is burnt-umber. The side tufts have white tips. The forewing upperside is brownish black with indistinct markings except the grey border of the postdiscal line, which is not interrupted. Both wing undersides are bright chestnut, with distinct brown distal borders and yellow bases. The hindwing underside has a yellow inner area which is quite sharply defined.
