= Macroglossum malitum =

Scientific classification
- Kingdom: Animalia
- Phylum: Arthropoda
- Class: Insecta
- Order: Lepidoptera
- Family: Sphingidae
- Genus: Macroglossum
- Species: M. malitum

Binomial name
- Macroglossum malitum Zwick & Treadaway, 2001

Species of moth

Macroglossum malitum is a moth of the family Sphingidae. It is known from the Philippines (Palawan).
