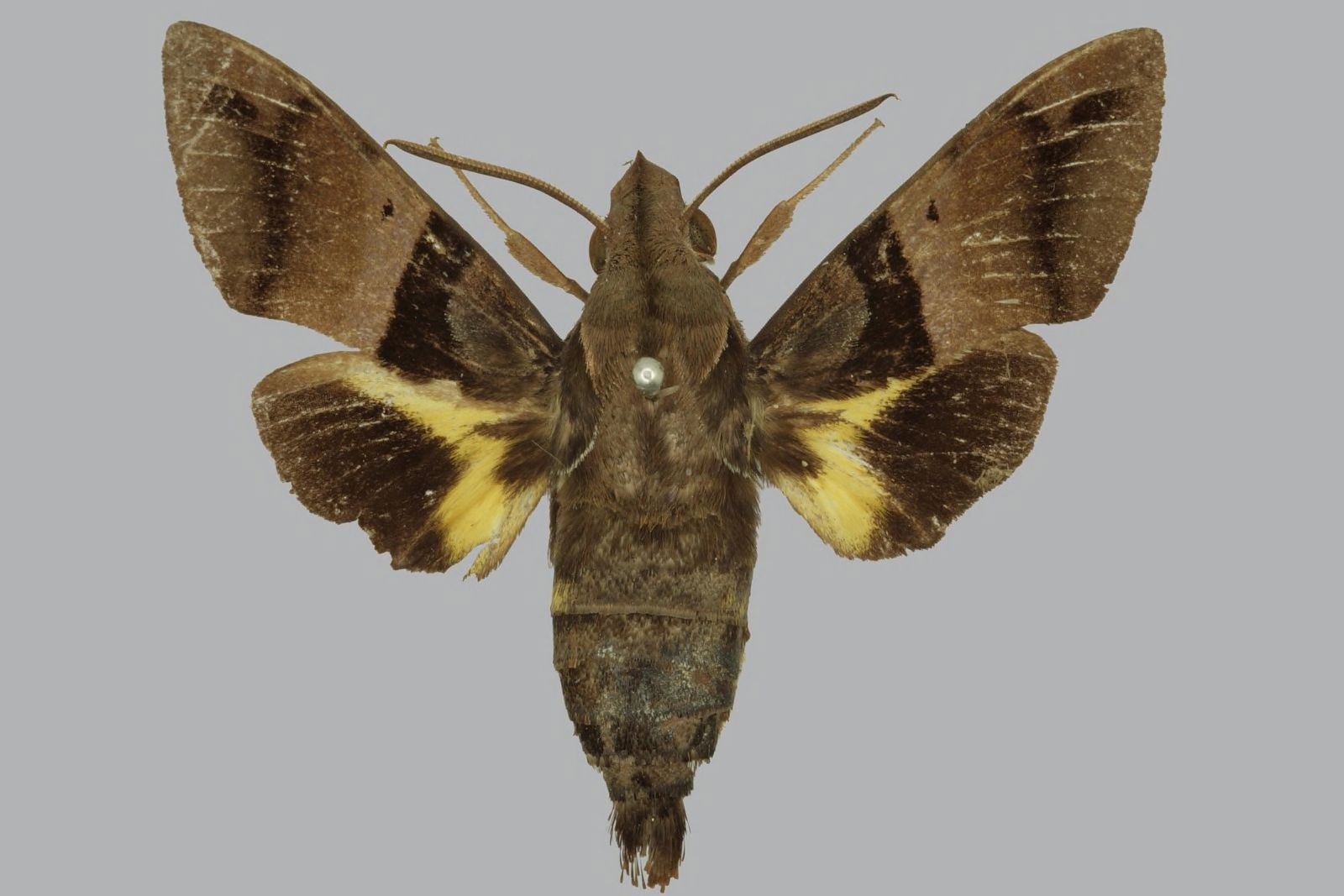
- Macroglossum stigma, male, upperside. Papua New Guinea, Brit. N.G., Hydrographer Mts.

Scientific classification
- Kingdom: Animalia
- Phylum: Arthropoda
- Class: Insecta
- Order: Lepidoptera
- Family: Sphingidae
- Genus: Macroglossum
- Species: M. stigma

Binomial name
- Macroglossum stigma Rothschild & Jordan, 1903

= Macroglossum stigma =

Species of moth

Macroglossum stigma is a moth of the family Sphingidae. It is known from Papua New Guinea.

The length of the forewings is about 26 mm. The head and thorax uppersides have a dark midline. The abdomen upperside has one yellow lateral patch. The underside of the palpus, middle of the thorax and the mesial abdominal patches are all greyish white. The sides of the thorax, legs and abdomen are deep brown. The forewing upperside has a basal area shaded with reddish grey. Both wing undersides are blackish brown, with a few greyish scales in the submarginal region. The hindwing upperside has a very broad black border.
