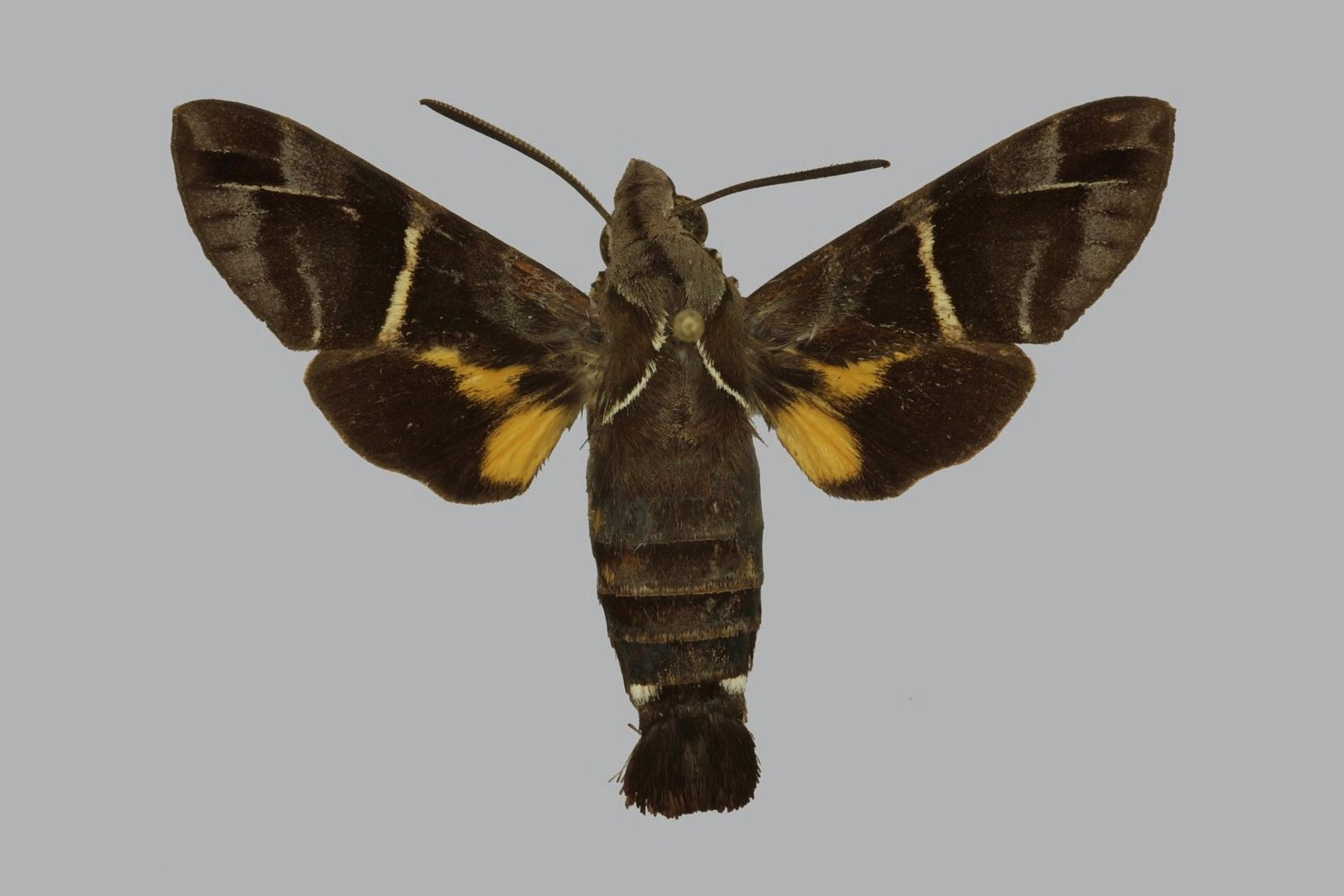
- Male museum specimen of Macroglossum albigutta albigutta

Scientific classification
- Kingdom: Animalia
- Phylum: Arthropoda
- Class: Insecta
- Order: Lepidoptera
- Family: Sphingidae
- Genus: Macroglossum
- Species: M. albigutta

Binomial name
- Macroglossum albigutta Rothschild & Jordan, 1903

= Macroglossum albigutta =

Species of moth

Macroglossum albigutta is a moth of the family Sphingidae. It is known from the Solomon Islands.

The length of the forewings is about 23 mm. It is a very dark species with a distinct white line above the eye. The abdomen upperside has two prominent white basal spots, brownish black side tufts and a yellow side patch. The underside of the palpus and middle of the thorax are greyish white. The thorax is dark brown laterally. The forewing upperside has an olive-black band proximal to the median band. The underside of both wings is dark brown, with the distal border being darker. The lines are indistinct.

== Subspecies ==
- Macroglossum albigutta albigutta
- Macroglossum albigutta floridense Rothschild & Jordan, 1903 (Florida Island)
