= Macroglossum stenoxanthum =

Scientific classification
- Kingdom: Animalia
- Phylum: Arthropoda
- Class: Insecta
- Order: Lepidoptera
- Family: Sphingidae
- Genus: Macroglossum
- Species: M. stenoxanthum

Binomial name
- Macroglossum stenoxanthum Turner, 1925

Species of moth

Macroglossum stenoxanthum is a moth of the family Sphingidae. It is known from northern Queensland.
