= Macroglossum perplexum =

Scientific classification
- Kingdom: Animalia
- Phylum: Arthropoda
- Class: Insecta
- Order: Lepidoptera
- Family: Sphingidae
- Genus: Macroglossum
- Species: M. perplexum

Binomial name
- Macroglossum perplexum Eitschberger, 2003

Species of moth

Macroglossum perplexum is a moth of the family Sphingidae. It is known from Sulawesi.
