= List of moths of India (Sphingidae) =

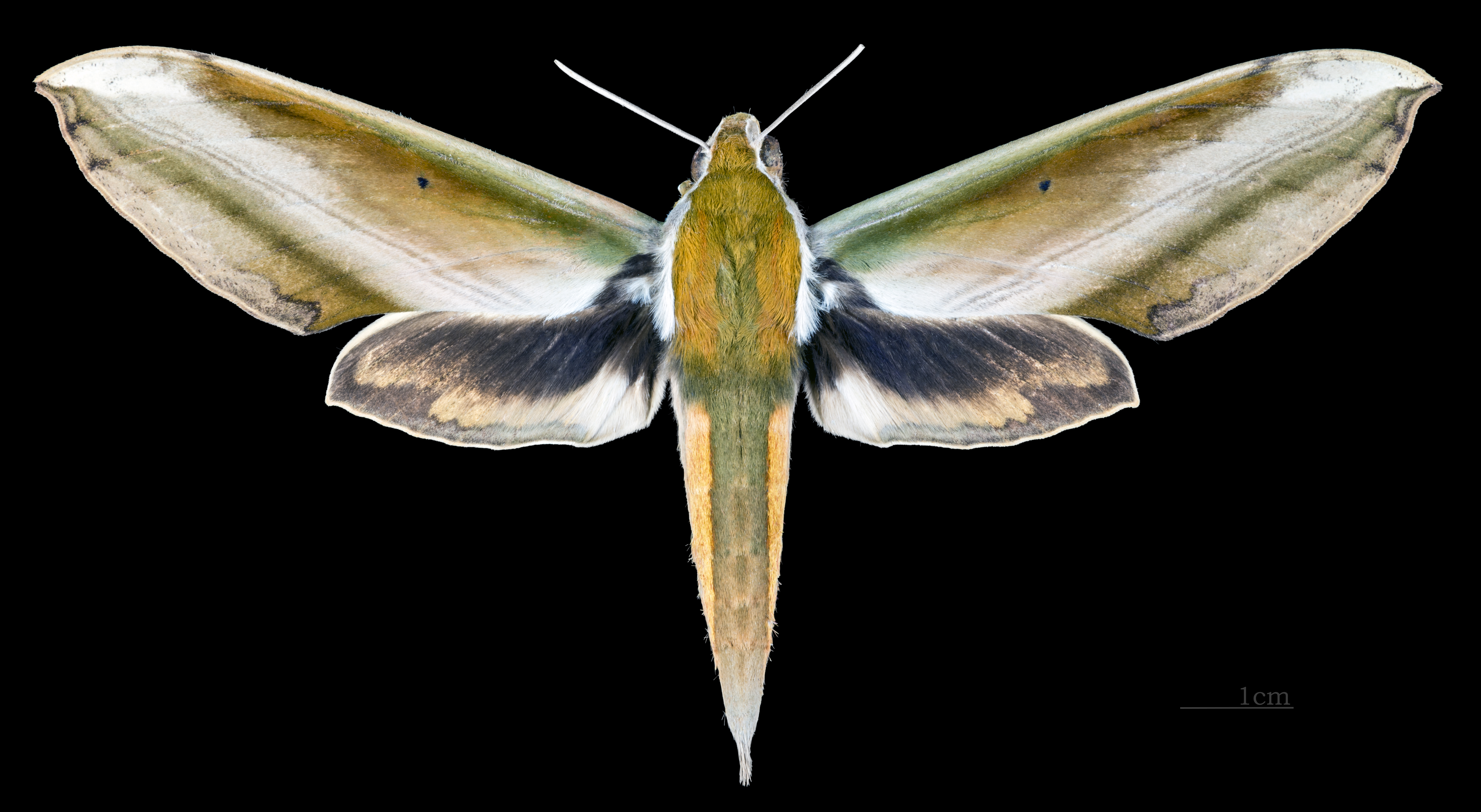
Theretra nessus, the yam hawk moth in Mudumalai National Park, Tamil Nadu, India

This is a list of moths of the family Sphingidae that are found in India. It also acts as an index to the species articles and forms part of the full List of moths of India. The list is under development.

== Subfamily Sphinginae ==
=== Genus Agrius ===
- Agrius convolvuli Linnaeus 1758

=== Genus Megacorma ===
- Megacorma obliqua Rothschild & Jordan 1903

=== Genus Acherontia ===
- Acherontia lachesis Fabricius 1798
- Acherontia styx Westwood 1848

=== Genus Meganoton ===
- Meganoton analis C. Felder & R. Felder
- Meganoton nyctiphanes Walker 1856
- Meganoton rubescens Butler 1875

=== Genus Psilogramma ===
- Psilogramma increta Walker 1865
- Psilogramma menephron Cramer 1780

=== Genus Apocalypsis ===
- Apocalypsis velox Butler 1876

=== Genus Pseudodolbina ===
- Pseudodolbina fo Walker 1856
- Pseudodolbina aequalis Rothschild & Jordan 1903

=== Genus Thamnoecha ===
- Thamnoecha uniformis Butler 1875

=== Genus Pentateucha ===
- Pentateucha curiosa Swinhoe 1908

=== Genus Dolbina ===
- Dolbina grisea Hampson 1893
- Dolbina inexacta Walker 1856

== Subfamily Smerinthinae ==
=== Genus Amplypterus ===
- Amplypterus panopus Cramer 1779
- Amplypterus mansoni Clark 1924

=== Genus Ambulyx ===
- Ambulyx sericeipennis Butler 1875
- Ambulyx placida Moore 1888
- Ambulyx semiplacida Inoue 1990
- Ambulyx maculifera Walker 1866
- Ambulyx lahora Butler 1875
- Ambulyx ochracea Butler 1885
- Ambulyx matti Jordan 1923
- Ambulyx belli Jordan 1923
- Ambulyx liturata Butler 1875
- Ambulyx substrigilis Westwood 1848
- Ambulyx canescens Walker 1864
- Ambulyx moorei Moore 1858
- Ambulyx auripennis Moore 1879
- Ambulyx lestradei Cadiou 1998
- Ambulyx sinjaevi Brechlin, 1998
- Ambulyx tobii Inoue 1996

=== Genus Clanis ===
- Clanis bilineata Walker 1866
- Clanis undulosa Moore 1879
- Clanis deucalion Walker 1856
- Clanis phalaris Cramer 1777
- Clanis titan Rothschild & Jordan 1903

=== Genus Leucophlebia ===
- Leucophlebia lineata Westwood 1847
- Leucophlebia emittens Walker 1866
- Leucophlebia rosacea Butler 1875

=== Genus Polyptychus ===
- Polyptychus trilineatus Moore 1888
- Polyptychus dentatus Cramer 1777

=== Genus Marumba ===
- Marumba harutai Eitschberger & Ihle 2012
- Marumba cristata Butler 1875
- Marumba spectabilis Butler 1875
- Marumba dyras Walker 1856
- Marumba sperchius Ménétriés 1857
- Marumba nympha Rothschild & Jordan 1903
- Marumba indicus Walker 1856
- Marumba poliotis Hampson 1907

=== Genus Morwennius ===
- Morwennius decoratus Moore 1872

=== Genus Daphnusa ===
- Daphnusa sinocontinentalis Brechlin 2009

=== Genus Langia ===
- Langia zenzeroides Moore 1872

=== Genus Rhodoprasina ===
- Rhodoprasina floralis Butler 1876
- Rhodoprasina callantha Jordan 1929
- Rhodoprasina koerferi Brechlin, 2010

=== Genus Clanidopsis ===
- Clanidopsis exusta Butler 1875

=== Genus Agnosia ===
- Agnosia orneus Westwood 1847
- Agnosia microta Hampson 1907

=== Genus Craspedortha ===
- Craspedortha porphyria Butler 1877

=== Genus Cypa ===
- Cypa uniformis Mell 1922
- Cypa decolor Walker 1856
- Cypa enodis Jordan 1931
- Cypa ferruginea Walker, 1865

=== Genus Cypoides ===
- Cypoides parachinensis Brechlin 2009

=== Genus Smerinthulus ===
- Smerinthulus perversa Rothschild 1895

=== Genus Degmaptera ===
- Degmaptera mirabilis Rothschild 1894

=== Genus Callambulyx ===
- Callambulyx rubricosa Walker 1856
- Callambulyx junonia Butler 1881
- Callambulyx poecilus Rothschild 1898

=== Genus Anambulyx ===
- Anambulyx elwesi Druce 1882

=== Genus Smerinthus ===
- Smerinthus kindermannii Lederer 1852

=== Genus Phyllosphingia ===
- Phyllosphingia dissimilis Bremer 1861

=== Genus Sataspes ===
- Sataspes infernalis Westwood 1848
- Sataspes xylocoparis Butler 1875
- Sataspes tagalica Boisduval 1875
- Sataspes scotti Jordan 1926

== Subfamily Macroglossinae ==
=== Genus Hemaris ===
- Hemaris rubra Hampson 1893
- Hemaris ducalis Staudinger 1887
- Hemaris fuciformis Linnaeus 1758
- Hemaris saundersii Walker 1856

=== Genus Cephonodes ===
- Cephonodes hylas Linnaeus 1771
- Cephonodes picus Cramer 1777

=== Genus Gnathothlibus ===
- Gnathothlibus erotus Cramer 1777

=== Genus Daphnis ===
- Daphnis nerii Linnaeus 1758
- Daphnis hypothous Cramer 1780
- Daphnis layardii Moore 1882
- Daphnis placida Walker 1856
- Daphnis minima Butler 1977

=== Genus Dahira ===
- Dahira rubiginosa Moore 1888
- Dahira obliquifascia Hampson 1910
- Dahira yunnanfuana Clark 1925
- Dahira marisae Schnitzler & Stüning 2009
- Dahira tridens Oberthür 1904

=== Genus Ampelophaga ===
- Ampelophaga rubiginosa Bremer & Grey 1852
- Ampelophaga khasiana Rothschild 1895
- Ampelophaga thomasi Cadiou & Kitching 1998
- Ampelophaga dolichoides Felder 1874

=== Genus Elibia ===
- Elibia dolichus Westwood 1847

=== Genus Acosmerycoides ===
- Acosmerycoides harterti Rothschild 1895

=== Genus Acosmeryx ===
- Acosmeryx anceus Stoll 1781
- Acosmeryx naga Moore 1857
- Acosmeryx sericeus Walker 1856
- Acosmeryx omissa Rothschild & Jordan 1903
- Acosmeryx shervillii Boisduval 1875
- Acosmeryx pseudonaga Butler 1881

=== Genus Eupanacra ===
- Eupanacra busiris Walker 1856
- Eupanacra automedon Walker 1856
- Eupanacra regularis Butler 1875
- Eupanacra variolosa Walker 1856
- Eupanacra sinuata Rothschild & Jordan 1903
- Eupanacra metallica Butler 1875
- Eupanacra perfecta Butler 1875
- Eupanacra mydon Walker 1856
- Eupanacra malayana Rothschild & Jordan 1903

=== Genus Angonyx ===
- Angonyx testacea Walker 1856
- Angonyx krishna Eitschberger & Haxaire, 2006

=== Genus Enpinanga ===
- Enpinanga assamensis Walker 1856
- Enpinanga borneensis Butler 1879

=== Genus Cizara ===
- Cizara sculpta C. Felder & R. Felder 1874

=== Genus Nephele ===
- Nephele hespera Fabricius 1775

=== Genus Neogurelca ===
- Neogurelca masuriensis Butler 1875
- Neogurelca hyas Walker 1856
- Neogurelca himachala Kirby 1892
- Neogurelca montana Jordan 1915

=== Genus Sphingonaepiopsis ===
- Sphingonaepiopsis pumilio Boisduval 1875

=== Genus Eurypteryx ===
- Eurypteryx bhaga Moore 1865

=== Genus Hayesiana ===
- Hayesiana triopus Westwood 1847

=== Genus Macroglossum ===
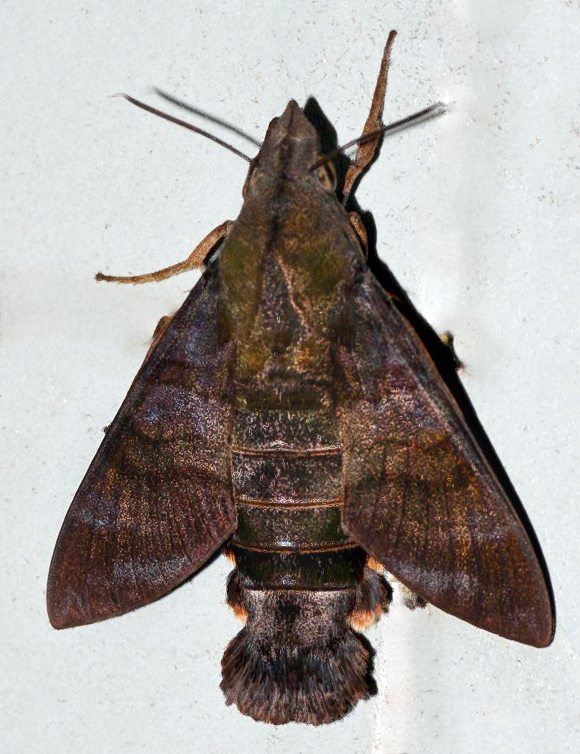
Macroglossum corythus

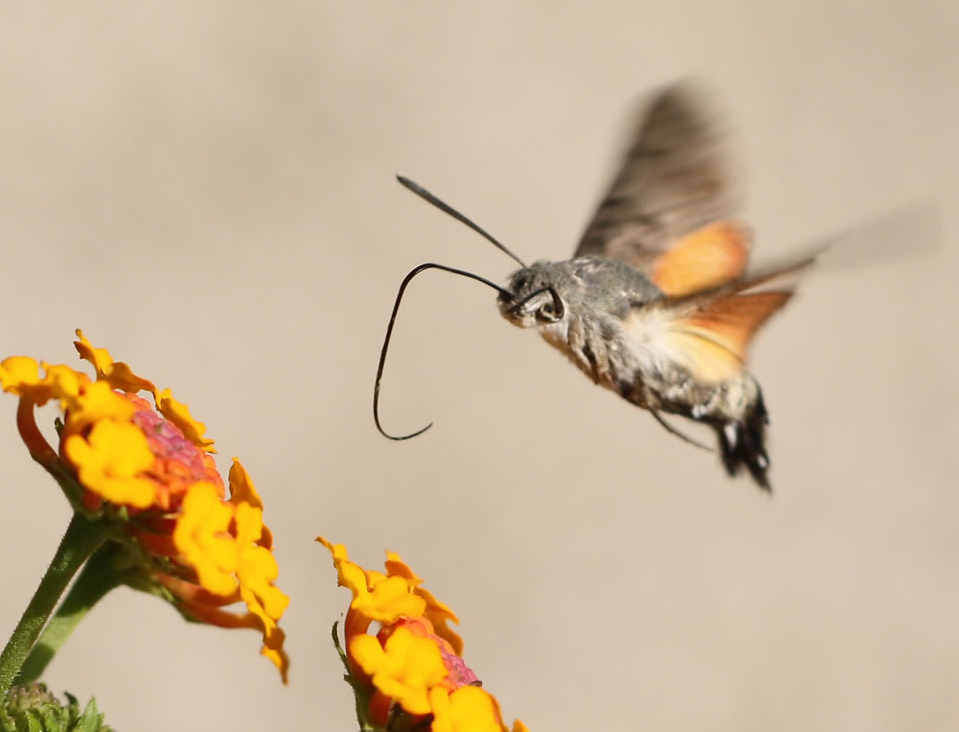
Macroglossum stellatarum

- Macroglossum affictitia Butler, 1875 (= M. vialis Butler, 1875 sensu Hampson, 1892)
- Macroglossum aquila Boisduval, 1875 (= M. interrupta Butler, 1875 sensu Hampson, 1892)
- Macroglossum assimilis Swainson, 1821 (= M. belia Hampson, [1893]; bengalensis Boisduval, [1875]; gilia Herrich-Schäffer, [1854] sensu Hampson, 1892)
- Macroglossum avicula Boisduval, [1875] note: Kitching & Cadiou (2000) note this species is probably not Indian, as it is found in Borneo, Java, Sumatra and the Philippines
- Macroglossum belis (Linnaeus, 1758)
- Macroglossum bombylans Boisduval, [1875] (= M. walkeri Butler, 1875 sensu Hampson, 1892)
- Macroglossum corythus Walker, 1856 (= M. proxima Butler, 1875 sensu Hampson, 1892)
- Macroglossum faro (Cramer, 1780)
- Macroglossum fervens Butler, 1875
- Macroglossum glaucoptera Butler, 1875 (= M. lepcha Butler, 1876 sensu Hampson, 1892)
- Macroglossum gyrans Walker, 1856
- Macroglossum heliophila Boisduval, 1875 (= M. divergens Walker, 1856 sensu Hampson, 1892; this is the Sri Lankan subspecies of M. heliophila (see Kitching & Cadiou, 2000))
- Macroglossum hemichroma Butler, 1875
- Macroglossum insipida Butler 1875
- Macroglossum mitchellii Boisduval, [1875]
  - Macroglossum mitchellii imperator Butler, 1875 (= M. imperator Butler, 1875 sensu Hampson, 1892)
- Macroglossum passalus (Drury, 1773) (= M. rectifascia R. Felder, [1874] sensu Hampson, 1892)
- Macroglossum regulus Boisduval, 1875 (= M. fervens Butler, 1875 sensu Hampson, 1892)
- Macroglossum semifasciata Hampson, 1892 [1893]
- Macroglossum sitiene Walker, 1856
- Macroglossum stellatarum (Linnaeus, 1758) (hummingbird hawk-moth)

=== Genus Hyles ===
- Hyles nervosa Rothschild & Jordan 1903
- Hyles gallii Rottemburg 1775
- Hyles nicaea De Prunner 1798
- Hyles hippophaes Esper 1789
- Hyles livornica Esper 1780

=== Genus Deilephila ===
- Deilephila elpenor Linnaeus 1758
- Deilephila rivularis Boisduval 1875

=== Genus Hippotion ===
- Hippotion velox Fabricius 1793
- Hippotion celerio Linnaeus 1758
- Hippotion echeclus Boisduval 1875
- Hippotion rafflesii Butler 1877
- Hippotion rosetta Swinhoe 1892
- Hippotion boerhaviae Fabricius 1775

=== Genus Theretra ===
- Theretra nessus Drury 1773
- Theretra boisduvali Bugnion 1839
- Theretra sumatrensis Joicey & Kaye 1917
- Theretra clotho Drury 1773
- Theretra gnoma Fabricius 1775
- Theretra latreillii W.S. MacLeay 1827
- Theretra alecto Linnaeus 1758
- Theretra mansoni Clark 1924
- Theretra suffusa Walker 1856
- Theretra lycetus Cramer 1775
- Theretra oldenlandiae Fabricius 1775
- Theretra silhetensis Walker 1856
- Theretra griseomarginata Hampson 1898
- Theretra insignis Butler 1882
- Theretra pallicosta Walker 1856
- Theretra castanea Moore 1872

=== Genus Pergesa ===
- Pergesa acteus Cramer 1777

=== Genus Rhagastis ===
- Rhagastis velata Walker 1866
- Rhagastis acuta Walker 1856
- Rhagastis castor Walker 1856
- Rhagastis confusa Rothschild & Jordan 1903
- Rhagastis lunata Rothschild 1900
- Rhagastis olivacea Moore 1857
- Rhagastis albomarginatus Rothschild 1894
- Rhagastis gloriosa Butler 1875

=== Genus Cechenena ===
- Cechenena mirabilis Butler 1875
- Cechenena aegrota Butler 1875
- Cechenena helops Walker 1856
- Cechenena minor Butler 1875
- Cechenena lineosa Walker 1856
- Cechenena scotti Rothschild 1920

== See also ==
- Sphingidae
- Moths
- Lepidoptera
- List of moths of India
