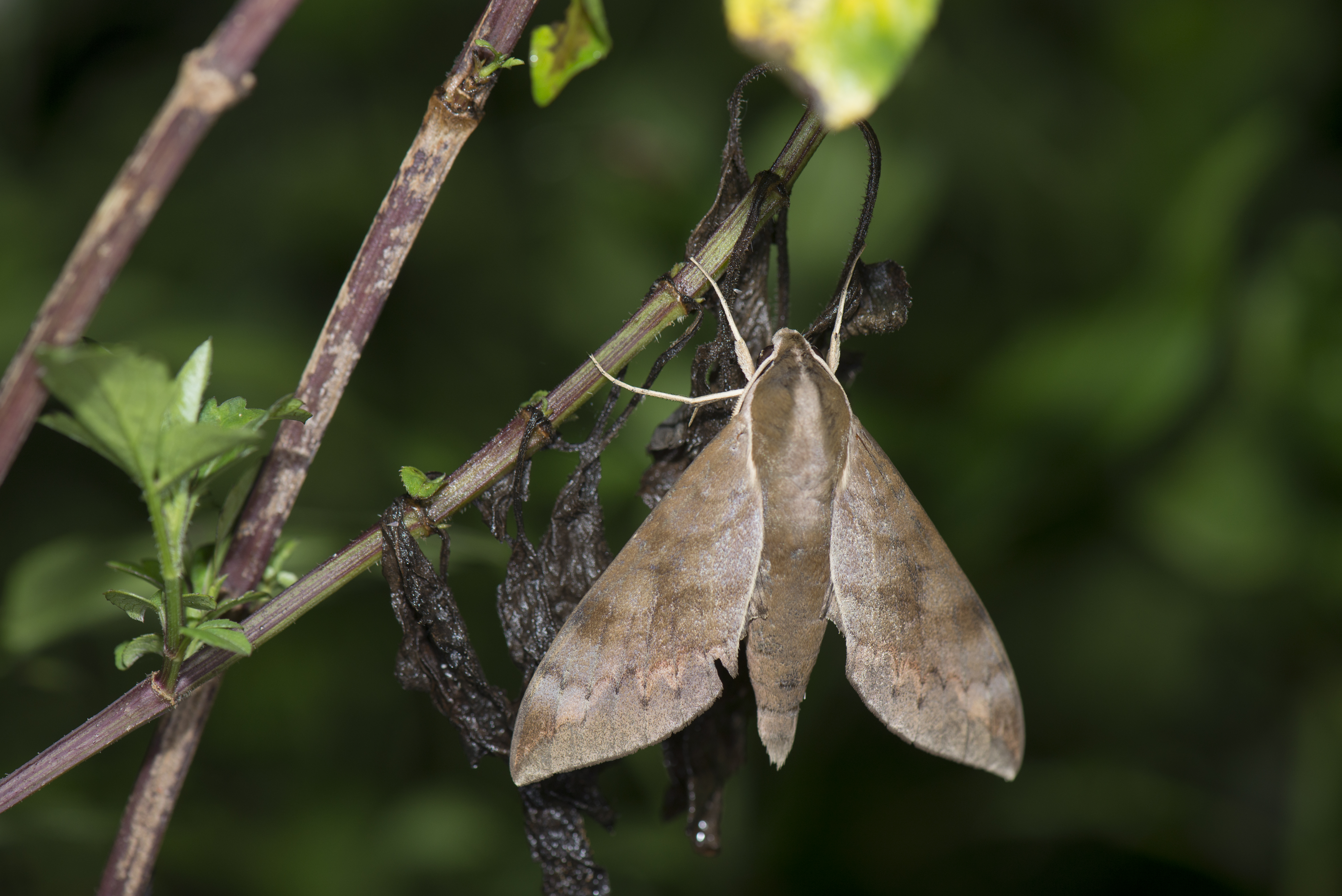

Scientific classification
- Kingdom: Animalia
- Phylum: Arthropoda
- Clade: Pancrustacea
- Class: Insecta
- Order: Lepidoptera
- Family: Sphingidae
- Genus: Acosmerycoides; Mell, 1922
- Species: A. harterti

Binomial name
- Acosmerycoides harterti (Rothschild, 1895)

Synonyms
- Ampelophaga harterti Rothschild, 1895; Ampelophaga takamukui Matsumura, 1927; Acosmerycoides horishana Matsumura, 1927; Acosmerycoides insignata Mell, 1922; Rhagastis leucocraspis Hampson, 1910

= Acosmerycoides =

Genus of moths

Acosmerycoides is a monotypic genus of moths in the family Sphingidae described by Rudolf Mell in 1922. Its only species, Acosmerycoides harterti or Hartert's hawkmoth, was described by Walter Rothschild in 1895.

== Distribution ==
It is found from Assam in India, eastwards across southern China to Taiwan and south to Thailand, Laos and Vietnam.

== Description ==
The wingspan is 80–90 mm.

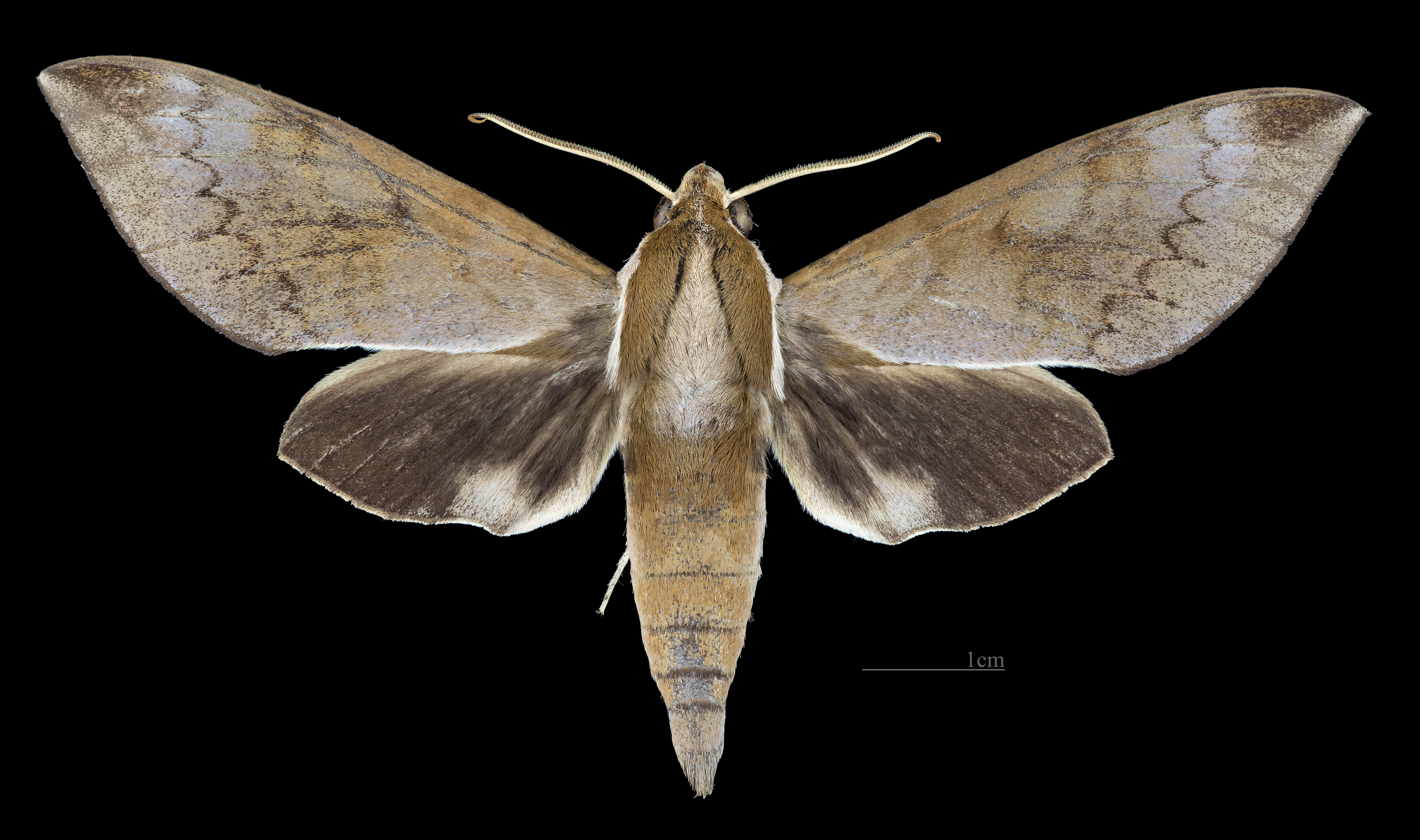
Acosmerycoides harterti ♂

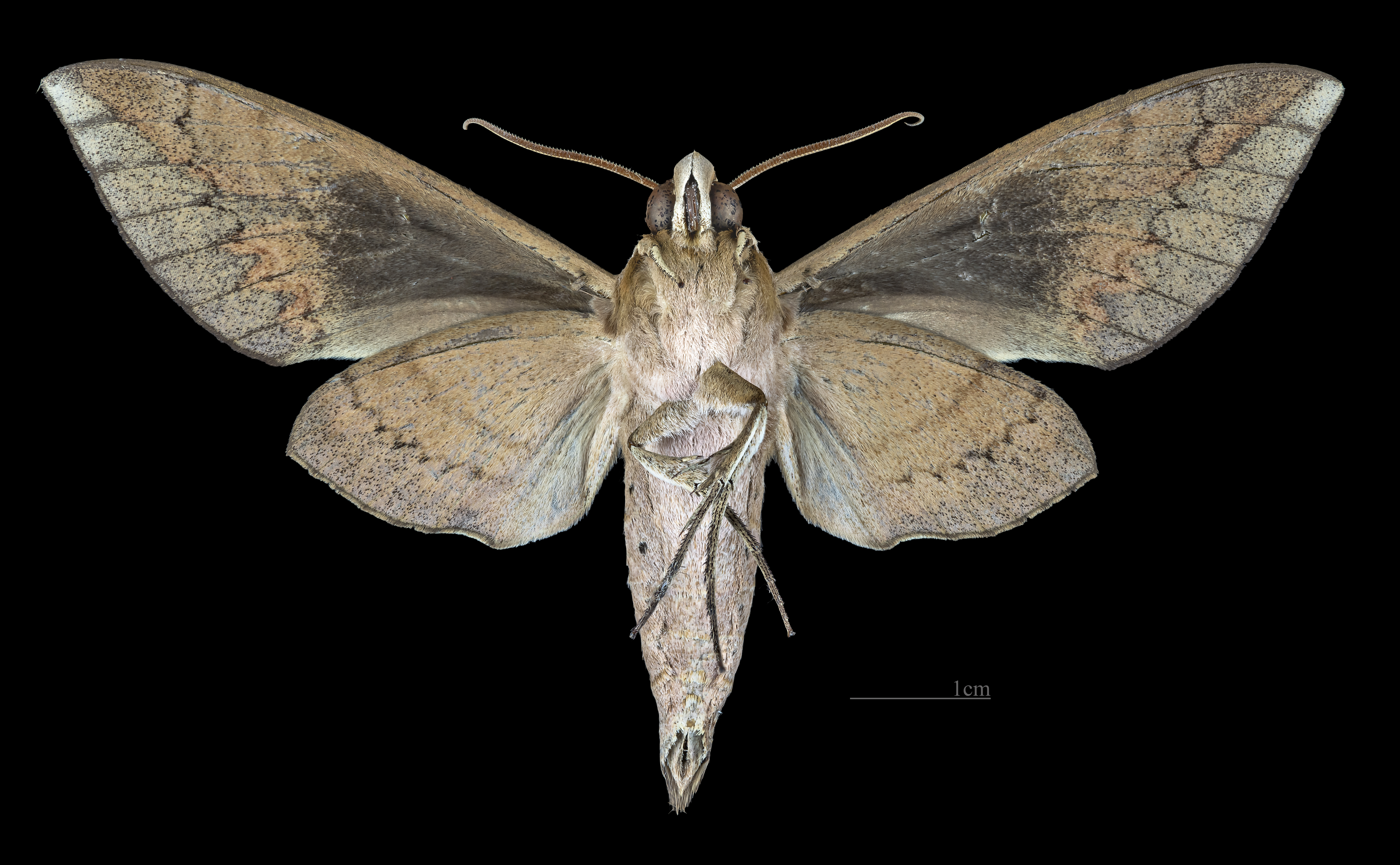
Acosmerycoides harterti ♂ △

== Biology ==
The larvae feed on Vitis species.
