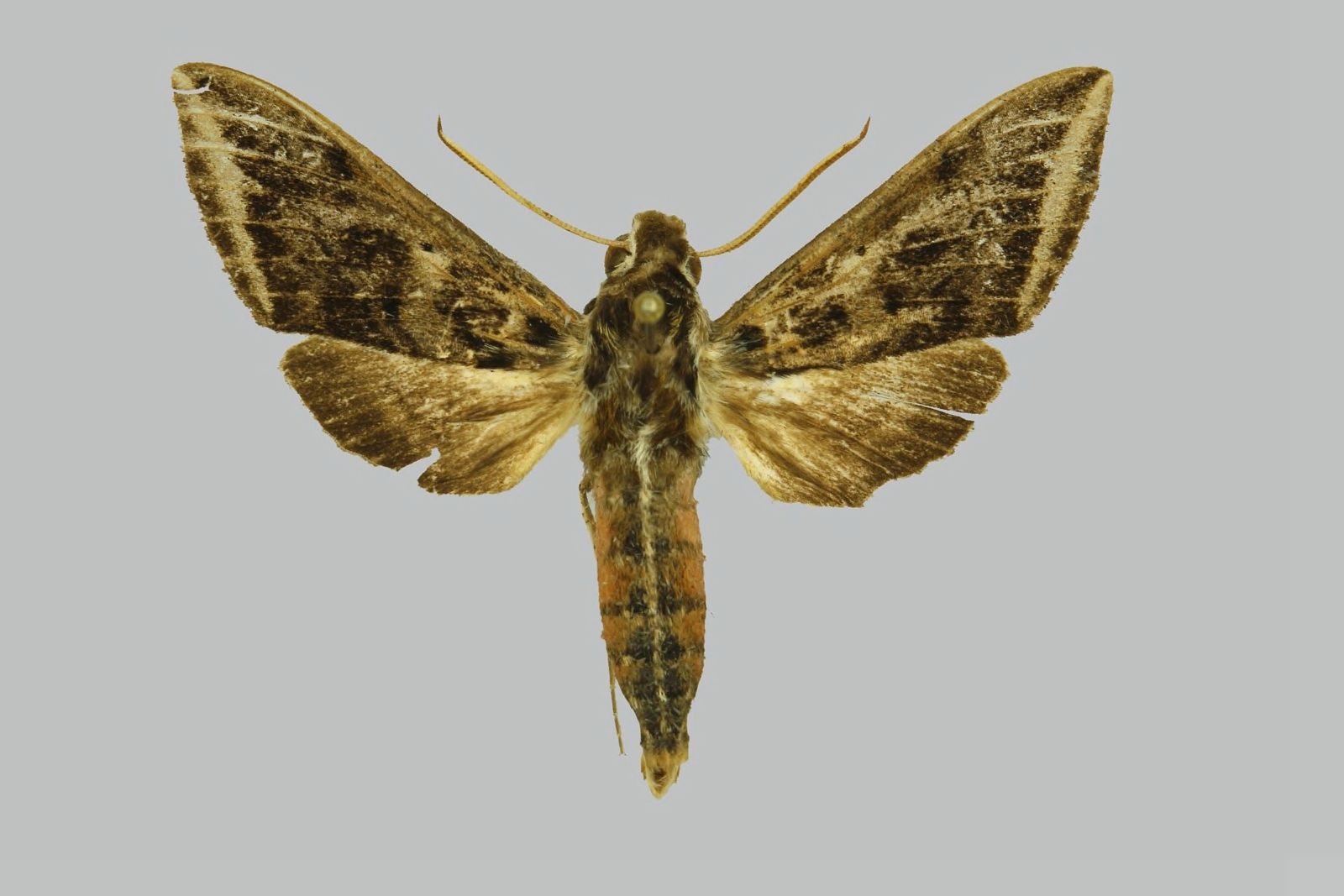

Scientific classification
- Kingdom: Animalia
- Phylum: Arthropoda
- Class: Insecta
- Order: Lepidoptera
- Family: Sphingidae
- Genus: Theretra
- Species: T. griseomarginata

Binomial name
- Theretra griseomarginata (Hampson, 1898)

Synonyms
- Chaerocampa griseomarginata Hampson, 1898; Chaerocampa griseo-marginata

= Theretra griseomarginata =

Species of moth

Theretra griseomarginata is a moth of the family Sphingidae. It is known from India.

The antenna are long, reaching beyond the apex of the forewing discal cell. The abdomen upperside has a single, narrow longitudinal white line. The forewing upperside has a diagnostic whitish submarginal band that runs nearly straight from the apex to near the tornus.
