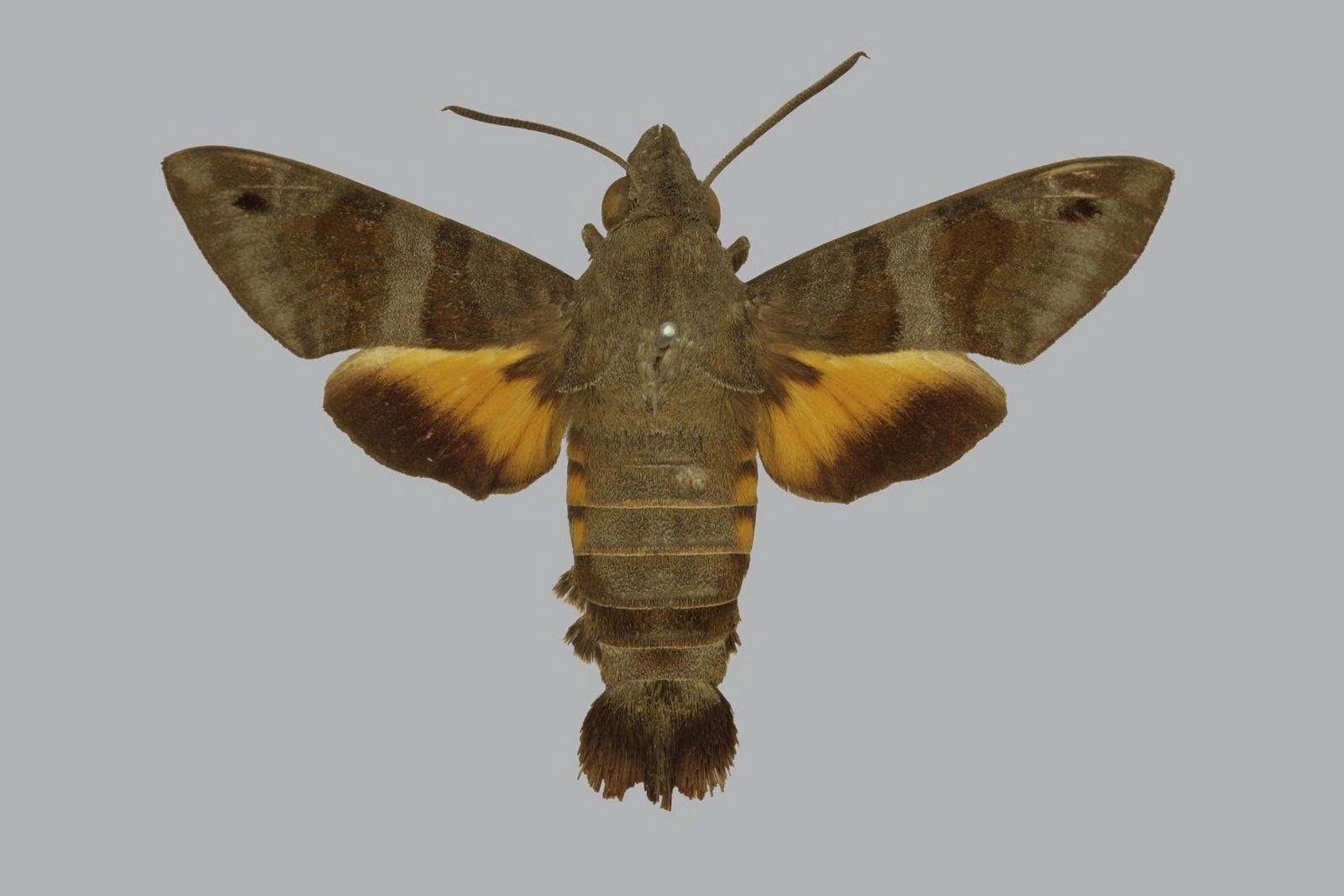

Scientific classification
- Kingdom: Animalia
- Phylum: Arthropoda
- Class: Insecta
- Order: Lepidoptera
- Family: Sphingidae
- Genus: Macroglossum
- Species: M. assimilis

Binomial name
- Macroglossum assimilis Swainson, 1821

Synonyms
- Macroglossa belia Hampson, 1893; Macroglossa bengalensis Boisduval, 1875; Macroglossa gilia Herrich-Schäffer, 1854; Macroglossum taxicolor Moore, 1879

= Macroglossum assimilis =

Species of moth

Macroglossum assimilis is a moth of the family Sphingidae. It was described by William Swainson in 1821 and is known from Bangladesh, India and Sri Lanka.

== Description ==
It is similar to Macroglossum belis, but the upperside of the abdomen has dark lateral patches that are less black and the underside of the abdomen and the wings are less reddish. The forewing upperside is flushed whitish grey. Head, thorax, abdomen, and forewings are greyish without a rufus tinge. Forewings with antemedial band are wide at the inner margin and straighter. Larva is bright green with a pale brown dorsal strip. A pale subdorsal stripe, with a red-brown edge above. Dorsal area speckled with brown. Spiracles are black with oblique brown stripes between them. Lateral area is speckled with white. Horn is black with a yellow tip. Legs are pinkish.
