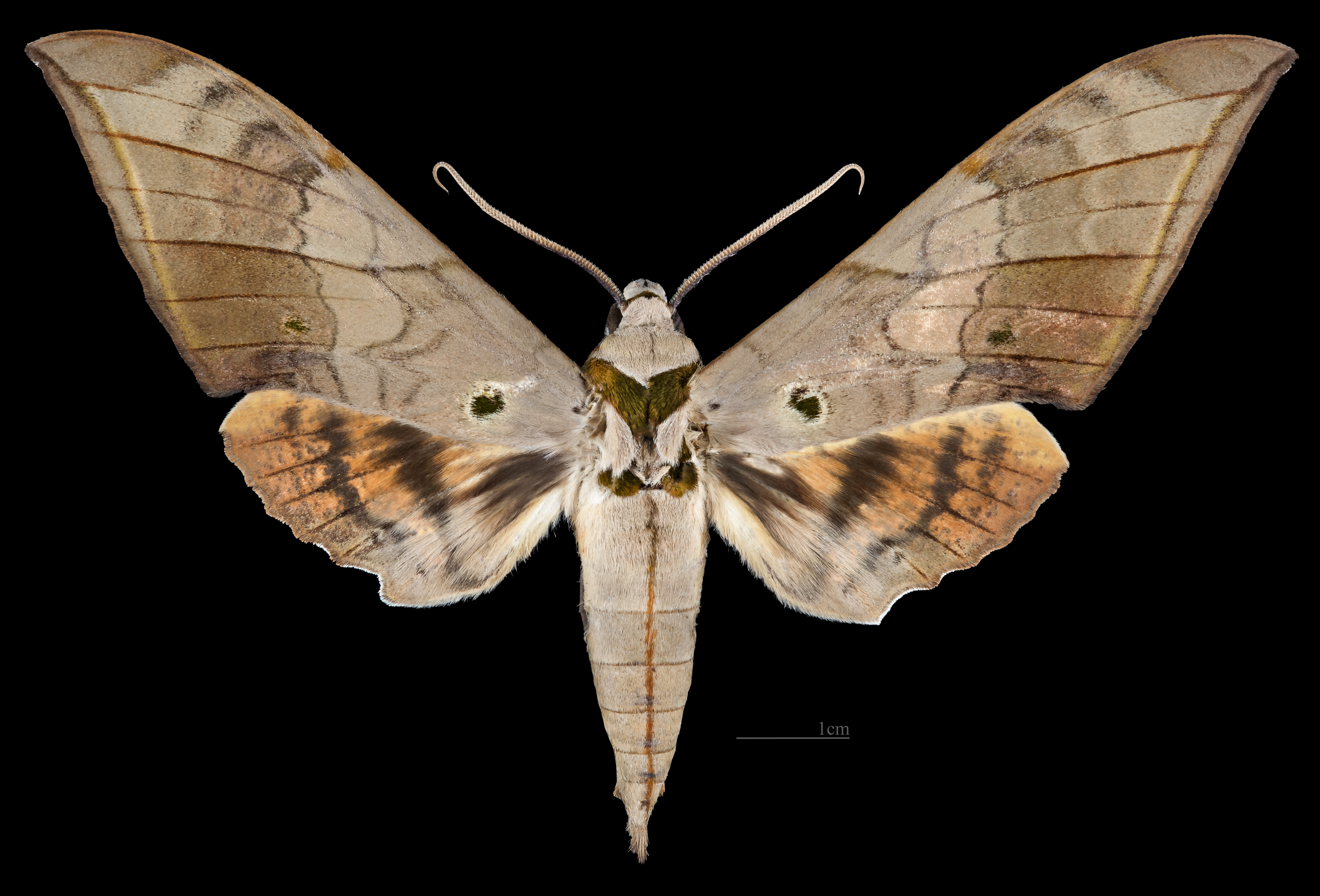
- Male dorsal view
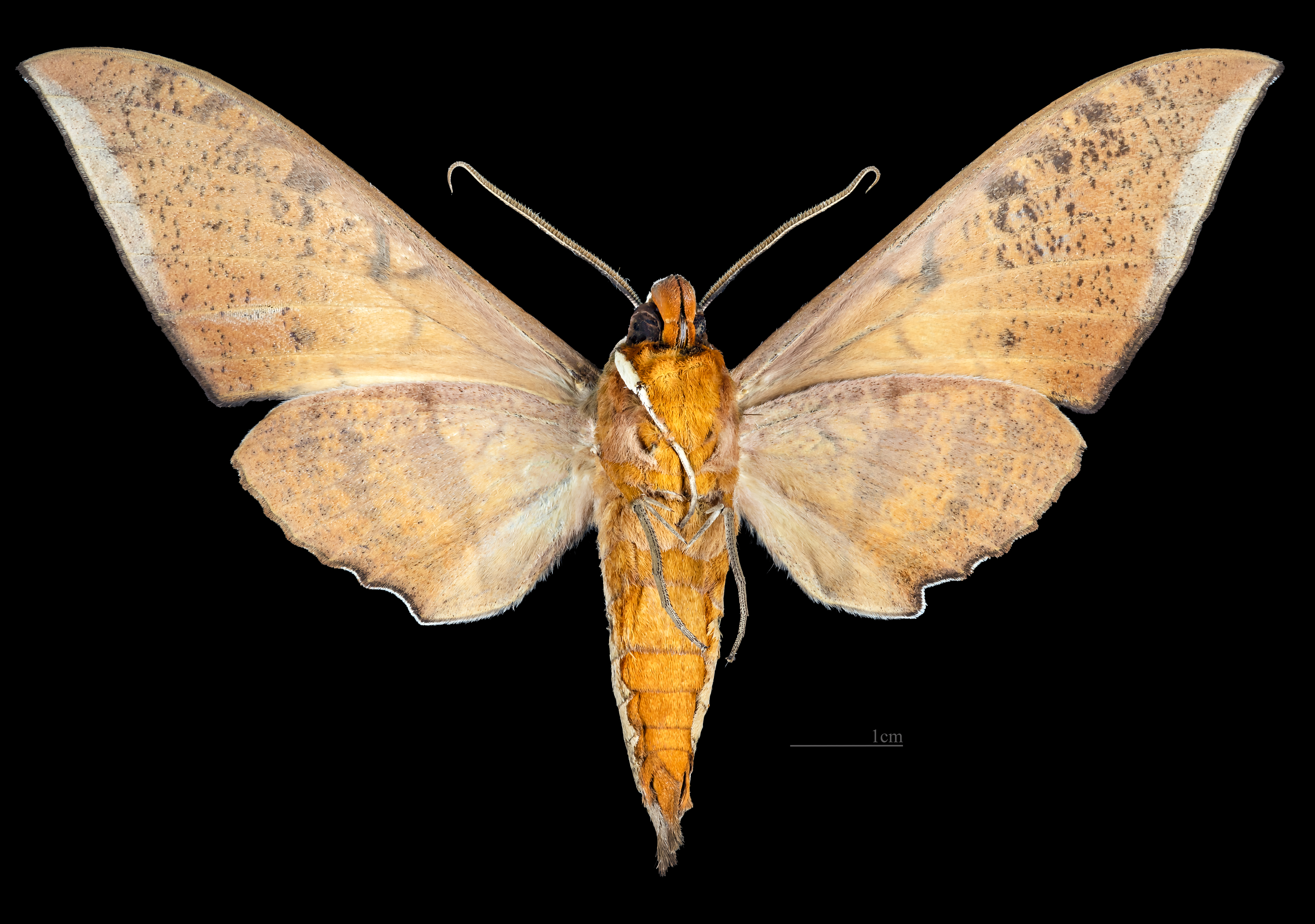
- Male ventral view

Scientific classification
- Kingdom: Animalia
- Phylum: Arthropoda
- Class: Insecta
- Order: Lepidoptera
- Family: Sphingidae
- Genus: Ambulyx
- Species: A. auripennis

Binomial name
- Ambulyx auripennis Moore, 1879

= Ambulyx auripennis =

Species of moth

Ambulyx auripennis is a species of moth in the family Sphingidae. It was described by Frederic Moore in 1879 and is known from Sri Lanka.

It is similar to Ambulyx substrigilis, but the underside of the body is deeper yellow and the markings on the wing are less conspicuous.

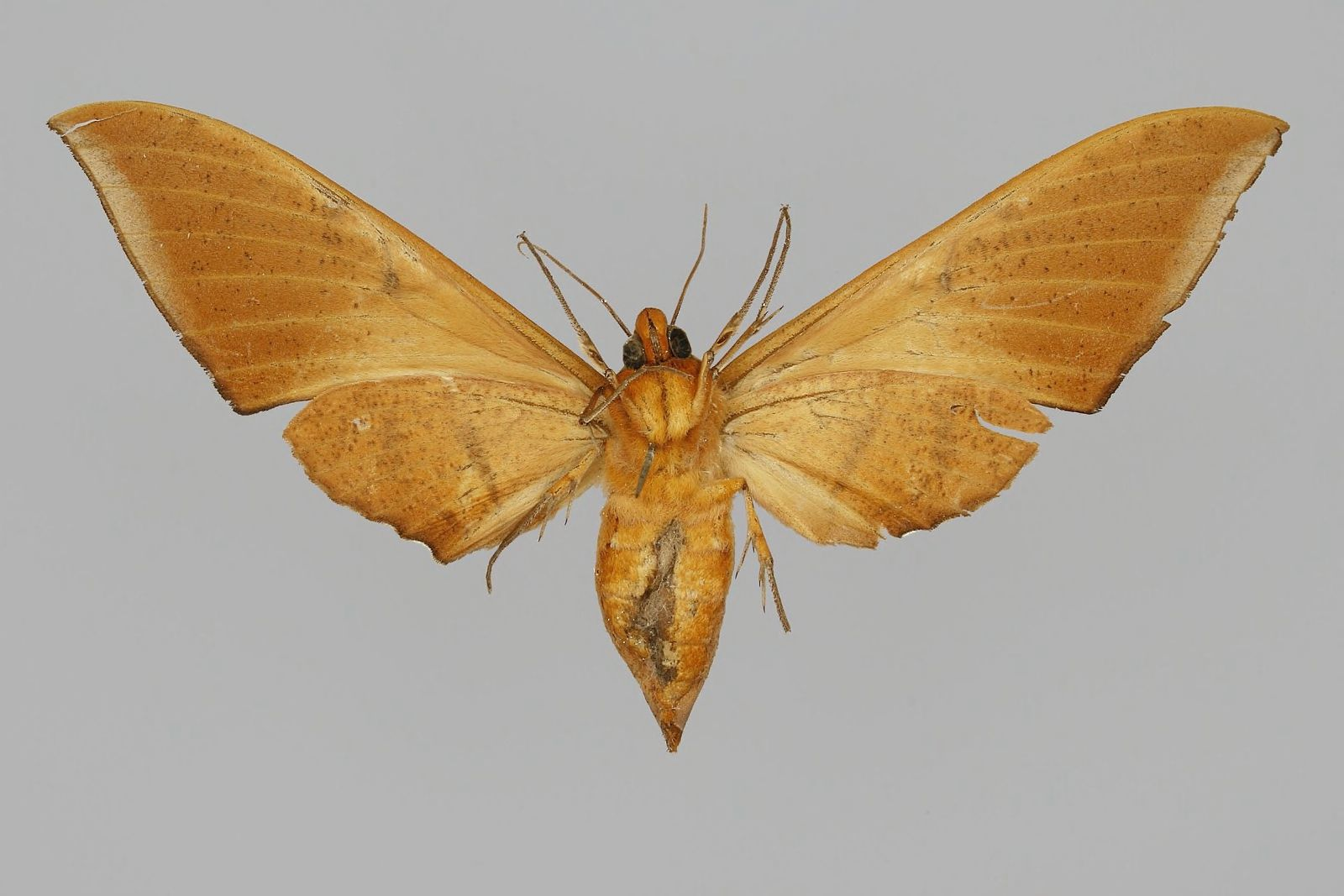
Female ventral view

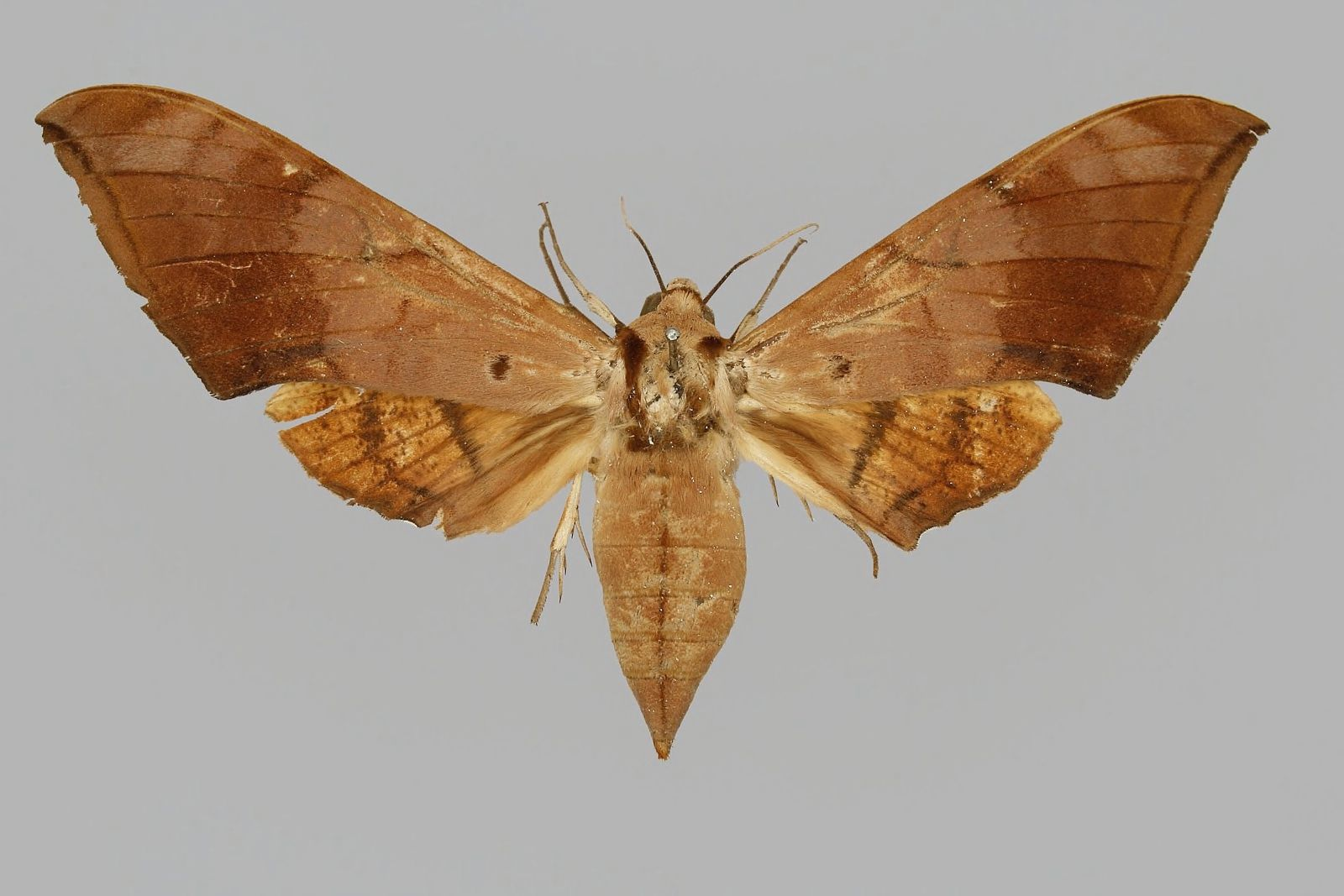
Female dorsal view
