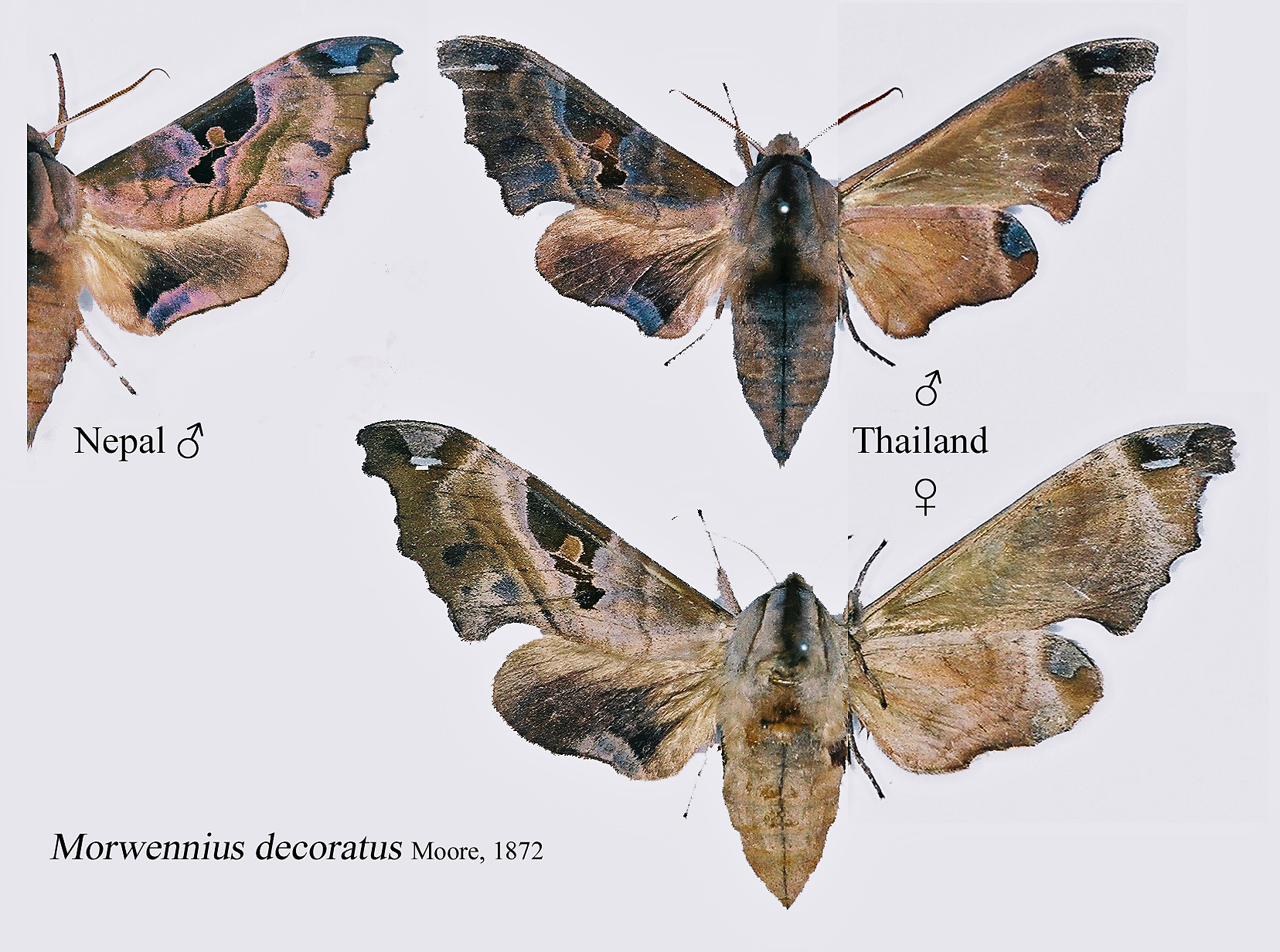

Scientific classification
- Domain: Eukaryota
- Kingdom: Animalia
- Phylum: Arthropoda
- Class: Insecta
- Order: Lepidoptera
- Family: Sphingidae
- Genus: Morwennius; Cassidy, Allen & Harman, 2002
- Species: M. decoratus

Binomial name
- Morwennius decoratus (Moore, 1872)

Synonyms
- Species synonymy: Morwennius indochinensis Gehlen, 1933; Morwennius strigfenestra Zhu & Wang, 1997

= Morwennius =

Genus of moths

Morwennius is a monotypic moth genus in the family Sphingidae described by Alan Charles Cassidy, Michael G. Allen and Tony W. Harman in 2002. Its only species, Morwennius decoratus, the ornamented hawkmoth, was described by Frederic Moore in 1872.

== Distribution ==
It is known from Nepal, Sikkim and Assam in north-eastern India, Yunnan in south-western China, northern Thailand, Laos, Peninsular Malaysia and Sumatra in Indonesia

== Description ==
The wingspan is about 72 mm.

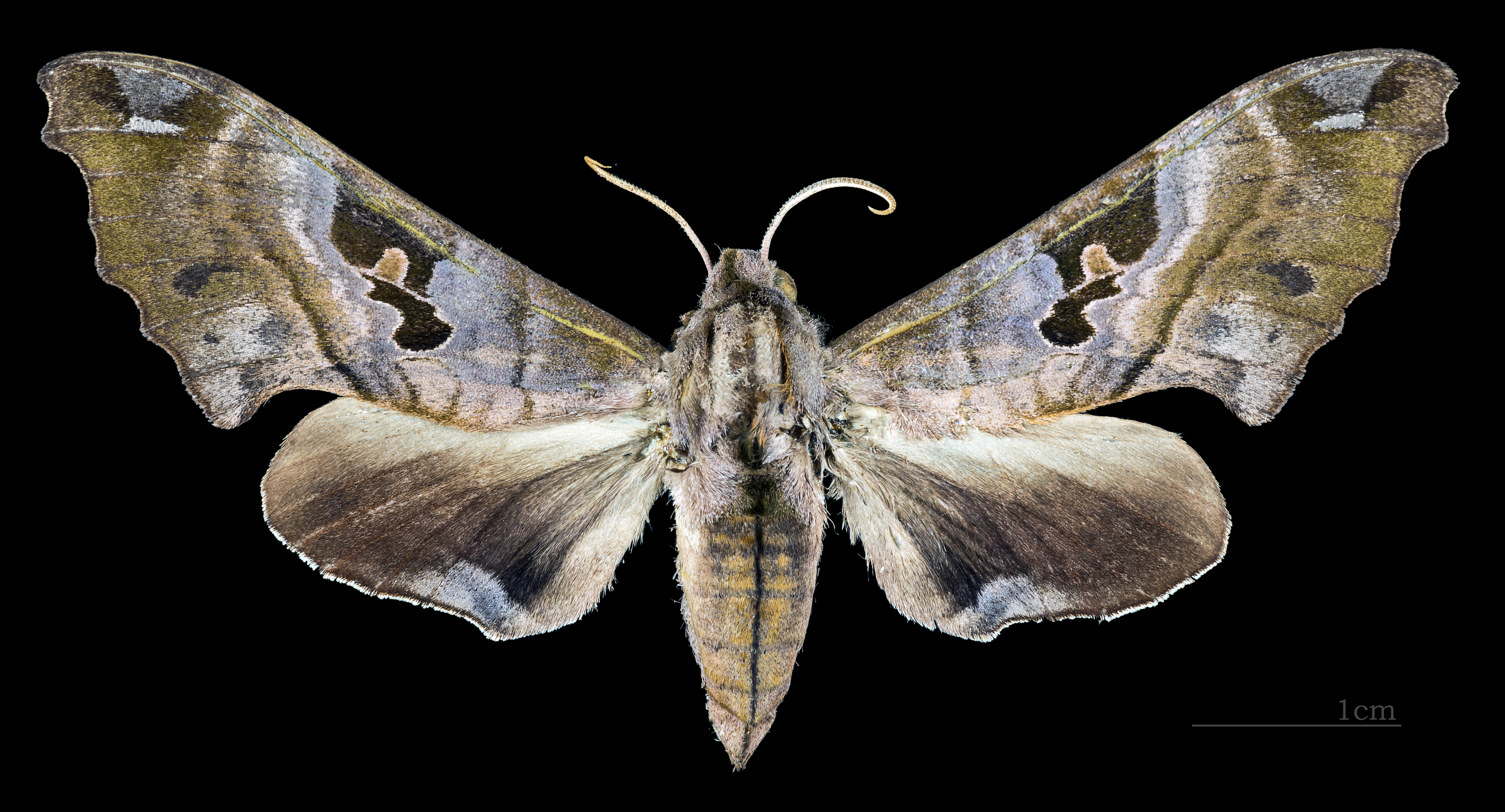
Female

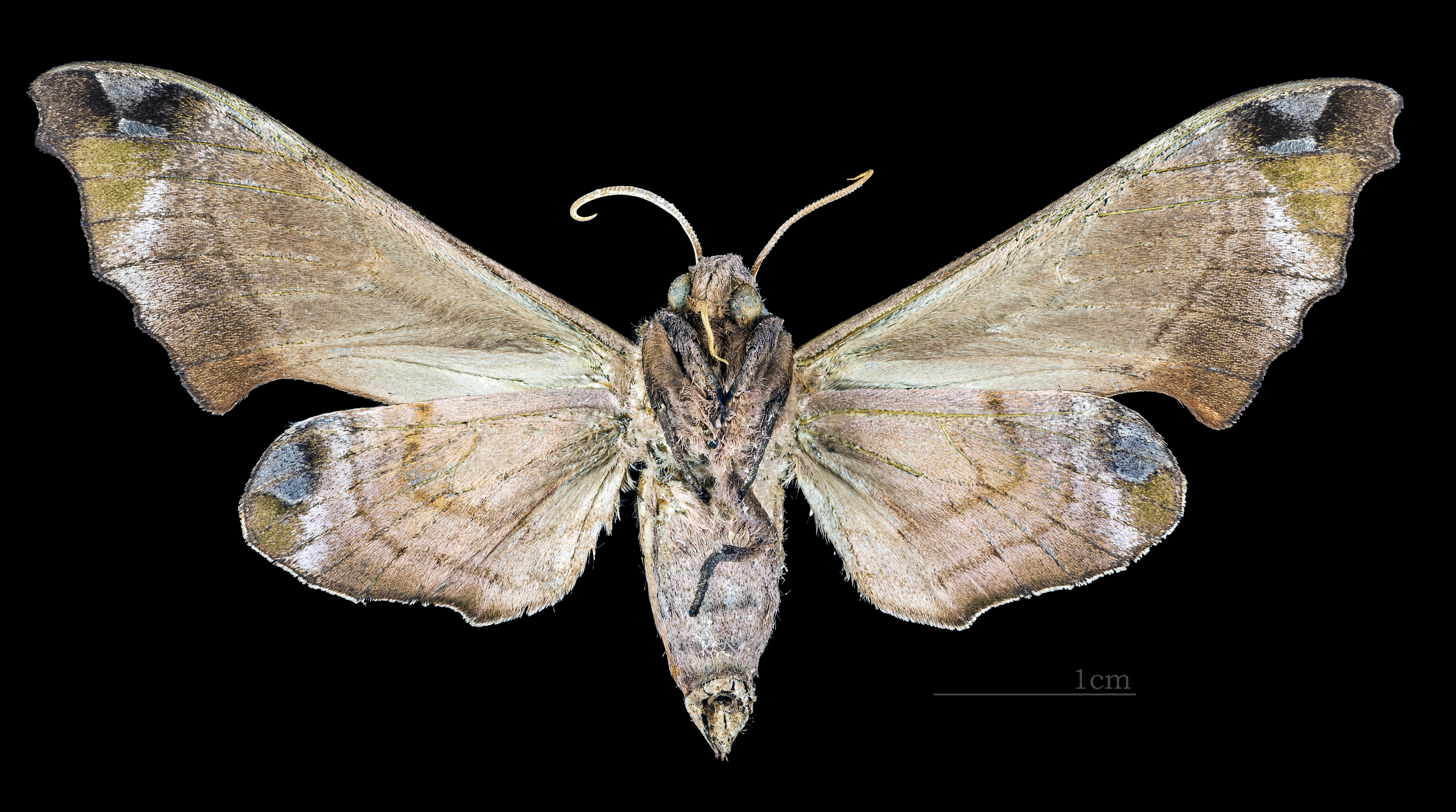
Female underside
