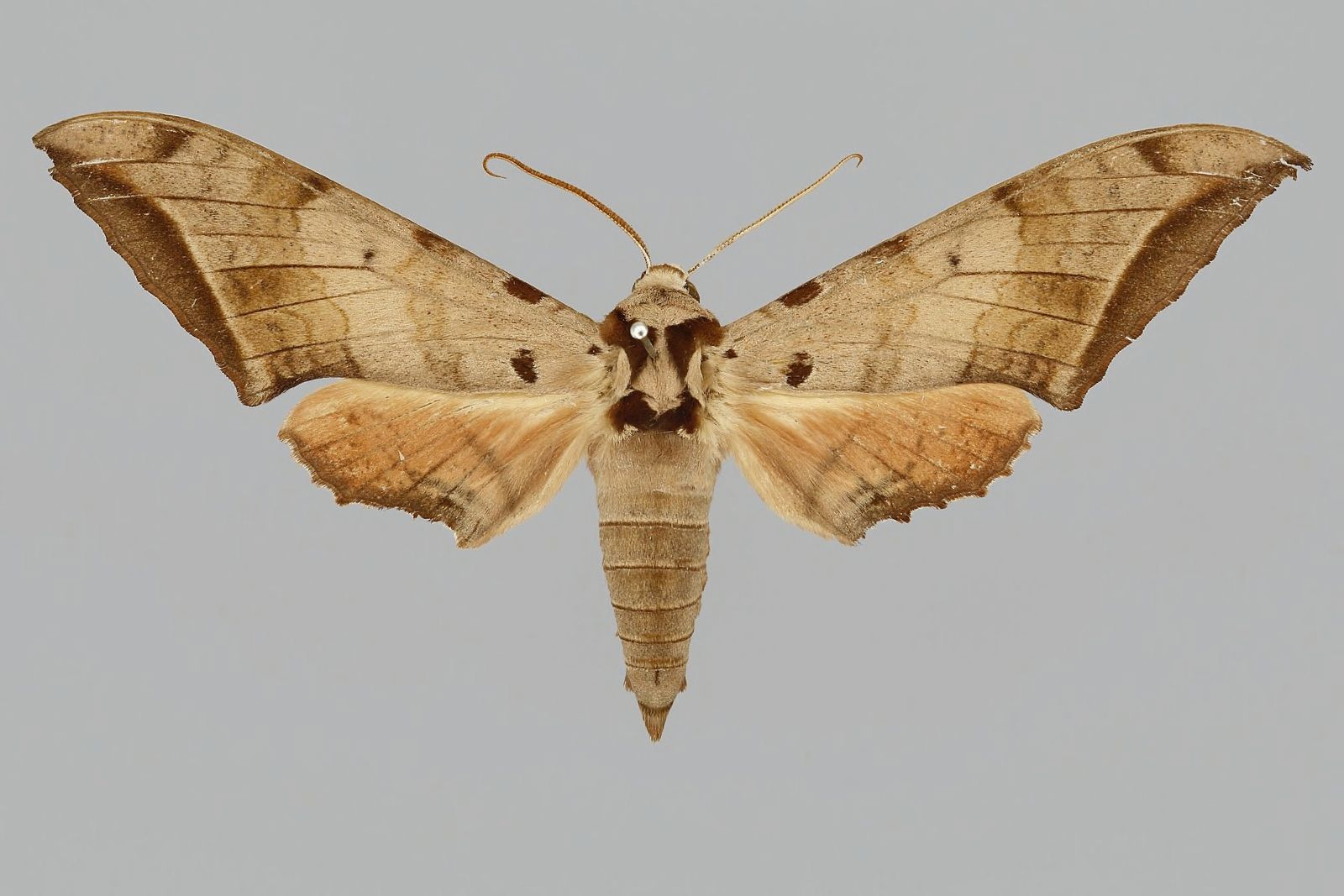
- Male

Scientific classification
- Kingdom: Animalia
- Phylum: Arthropoda
- Class: Insecta
- Order: Lepidoptera
- Family: Sphingidae
- Genus: Ambulyx
- Species: A. lahora

Binomial name
- Ambulyx lahora Butler, 1875

= Ambulyx lahora =

Species of moth

Ambulyx lahora is a species of moth of the family Sphingidae. It is known from the Himalaya in Pakistan and India.
