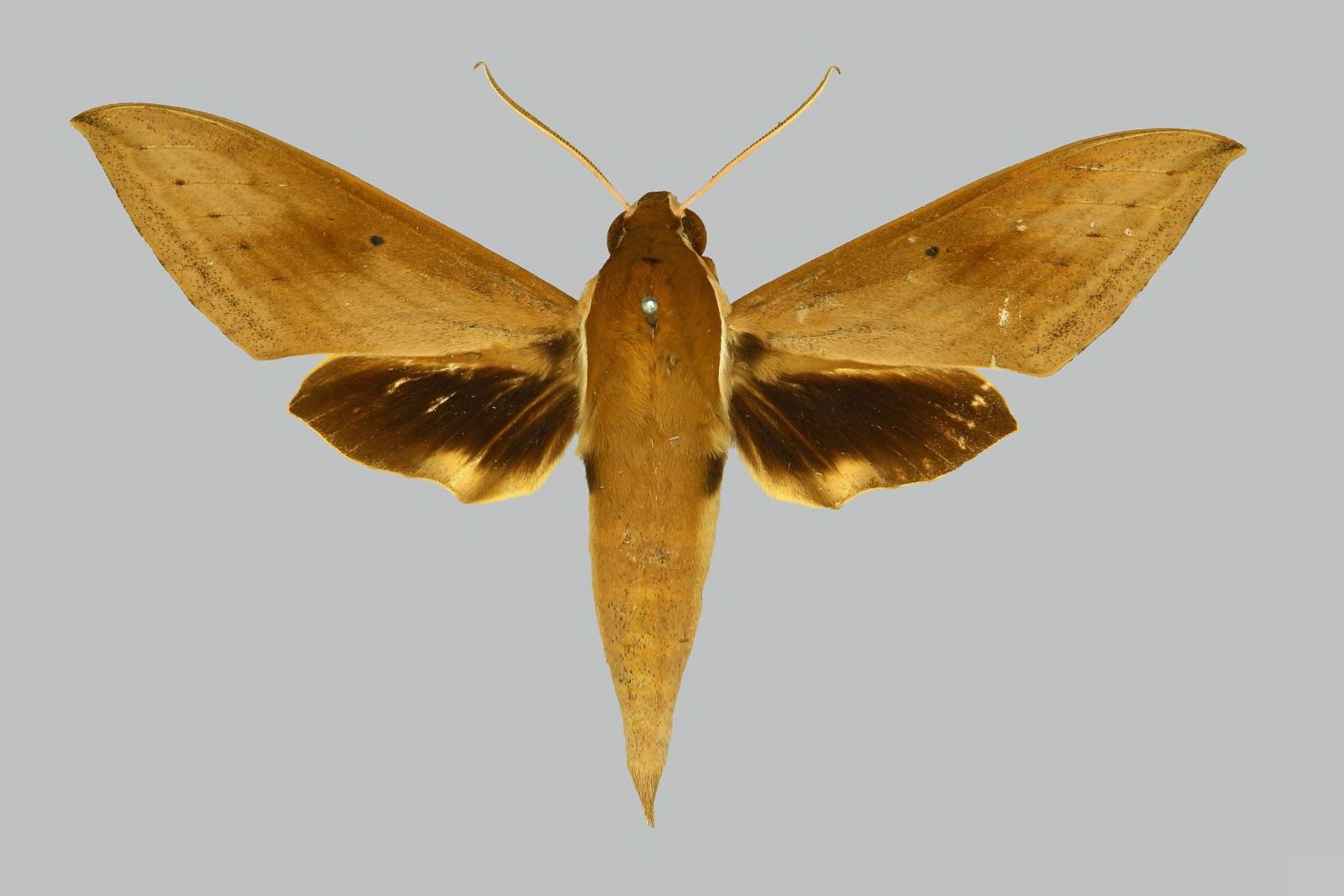
- Theretra sumatrensis, male, upperside. Sumatra

Scientific classification
- Kingdom: Animalia
- Phylum: Arthropoda
- Class: Insecta
- Order: Lepidoptera
- Family: Sphingidae
- Genus: Theretra
- Species: T. sumatrensis

Binomial name
- Theretra sumatrensis (Joicey & Kaye, 1917)

Synonyms
- Cechenena sumatrensis Joicey & Kaye, 1917; Theretra mercedes Eitschberger, 2002

= Theretra sumatrensis =

Species of moth

Theretra sumatrensis is a moth of the family Sphingidae. It is known from south-east Asia. It has been recently reported for the first time from Western Ghats.
