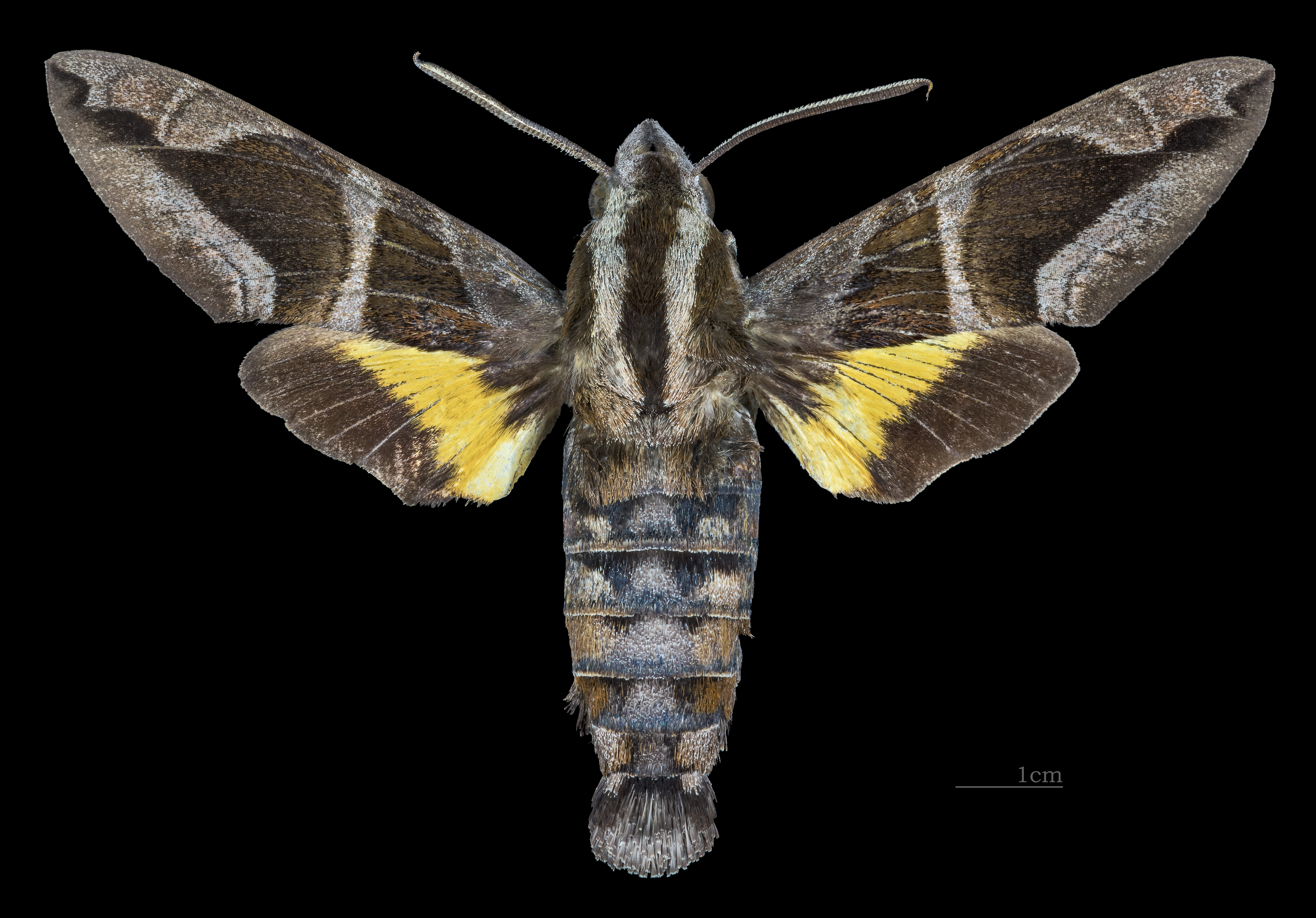
- Macroglossum mitchellii imperator – male dorsal
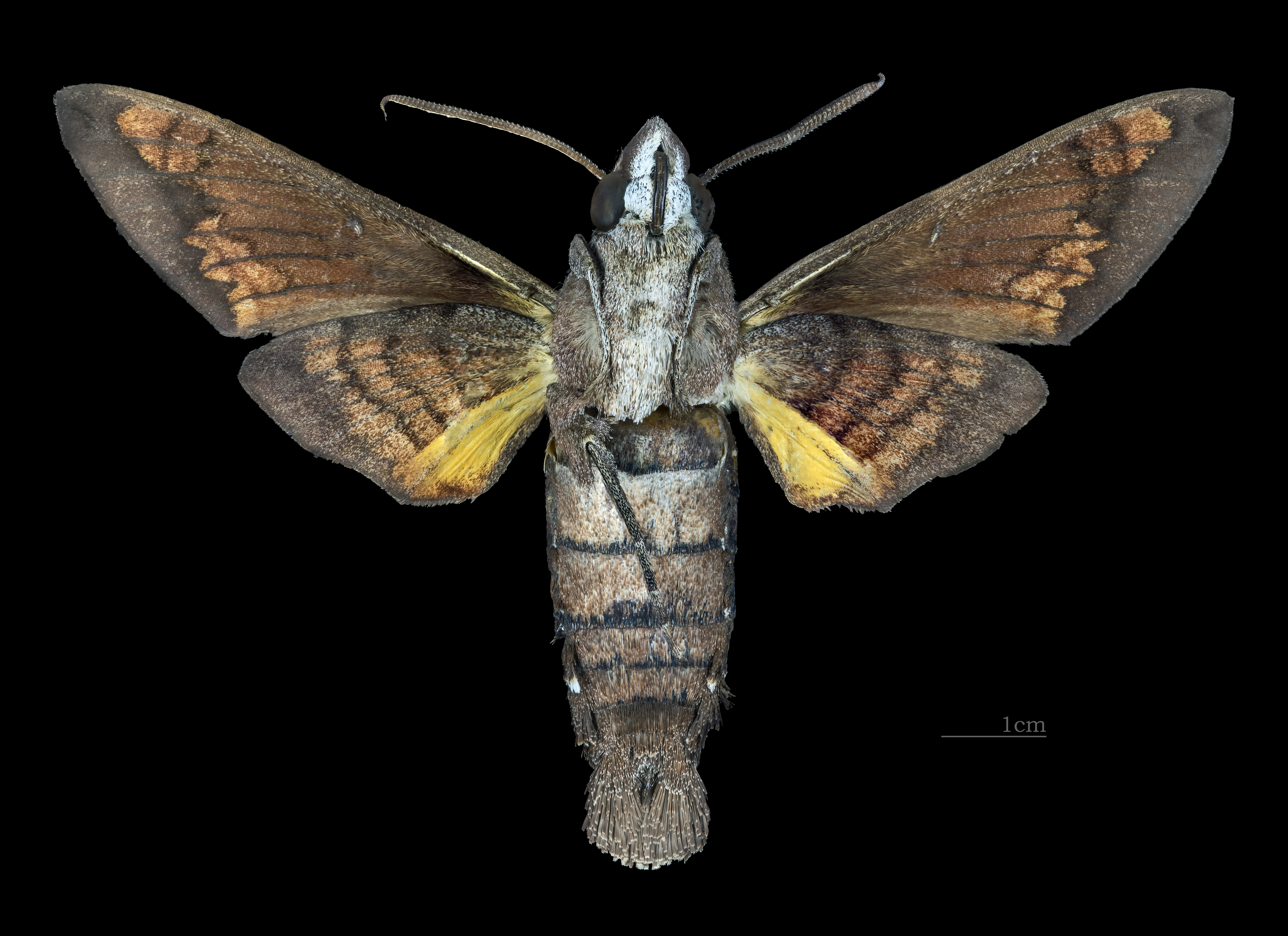
- Macroglossum mitchellii imperator – male ventral

Scientific classification
- Kingdom: Animalia
- Phylum: Arthropoda
- Class: Insecta
- Order: Lepidoptera
- Family: Sphingidae
- Genus: Macroglossum
- Species: M. mitchellii

Binomial name
- Macroglossum mitchellii Boisduval, 1875

Synonyms
- Macroglossa imperator Butler, 1875; Macroglossum mitchellii chinensis Clark, 1928

= Macroglossum mitchellii =

Grey-striped hummingbird hawkmoth

Species of moth

Macroglossum mitchellii, the grey-striped hummingbird hawkmoth, is a moth of the family Sphingidae described by Jean Baptiste Boisduval in 1875. It is known from Sri Lanka, southern and eastern India, Thailand, southern China, Taiwan, Vietnam, Malaysia (Peninsular, Sarawak) and Indonesia (Sumatra, Kalimantan, Java).

== Description ==
The wingspan is 55–74 mm. This species is easily recognised by the upperside of the head and thorax having a broad, very dark median stripe that divides the pinkish-grey background into two stripes. Forewings with antemedial band much broader at inner margin. Postmedial band is black in colour angled at vein 6, where it joined to subapical markings. Hindwings with yellow band broader and hardly constricted at middle. Ventral side has lines on hindwing rather more prominent.

== Subspecies ==
- Macroglossum mitchellii mitchellii (Java)
- Macroglossum mitchellii imperator Butler, 1875
