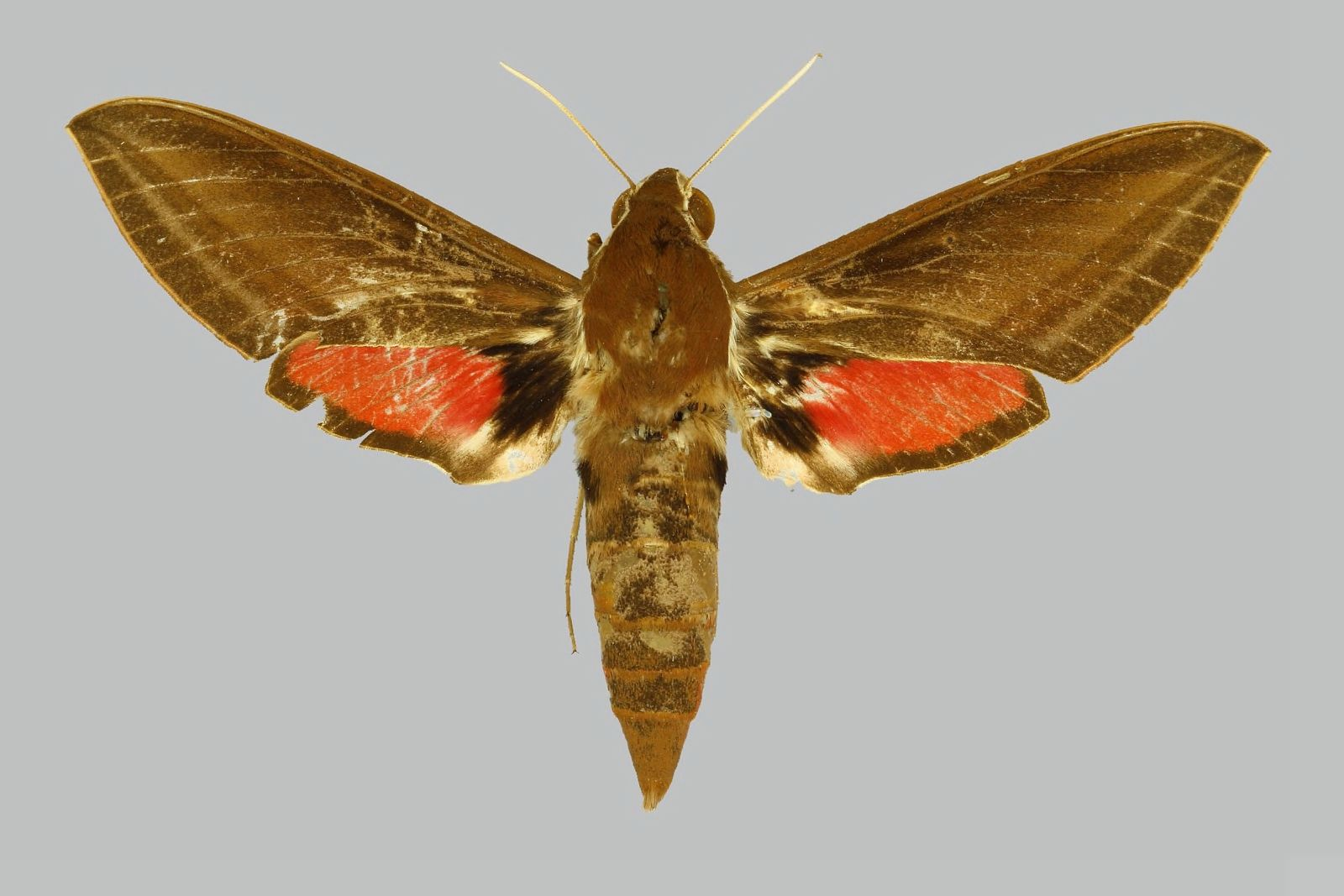
- Theretra alecto f. mansoni, male, upperside.

Scientific classification
- Kingdom: Animalia
- Phylum: Arthropoda
- Class: Insecta
- Order: Lepidoptera
- Family: Sphingidae
- Genus: Theretra
- Species: T. mansoni

Binomial name
- Theretra mansoni Clark, 1924

= Theretra mansoni =

Species of moth

Theretra mansoni is a moth of the family Sphingidae. It is known from India.

The length of the forewings is about 31 mm. It is very similar to Theretra alecto and is probably no more than a melanic variation of this species. The difference between the two species is the ground colour of the upperside of the body and forewings and the undersides of both wings. This colour is dark brown in Theretra manilae, while it is beige in Theretra alecto.
