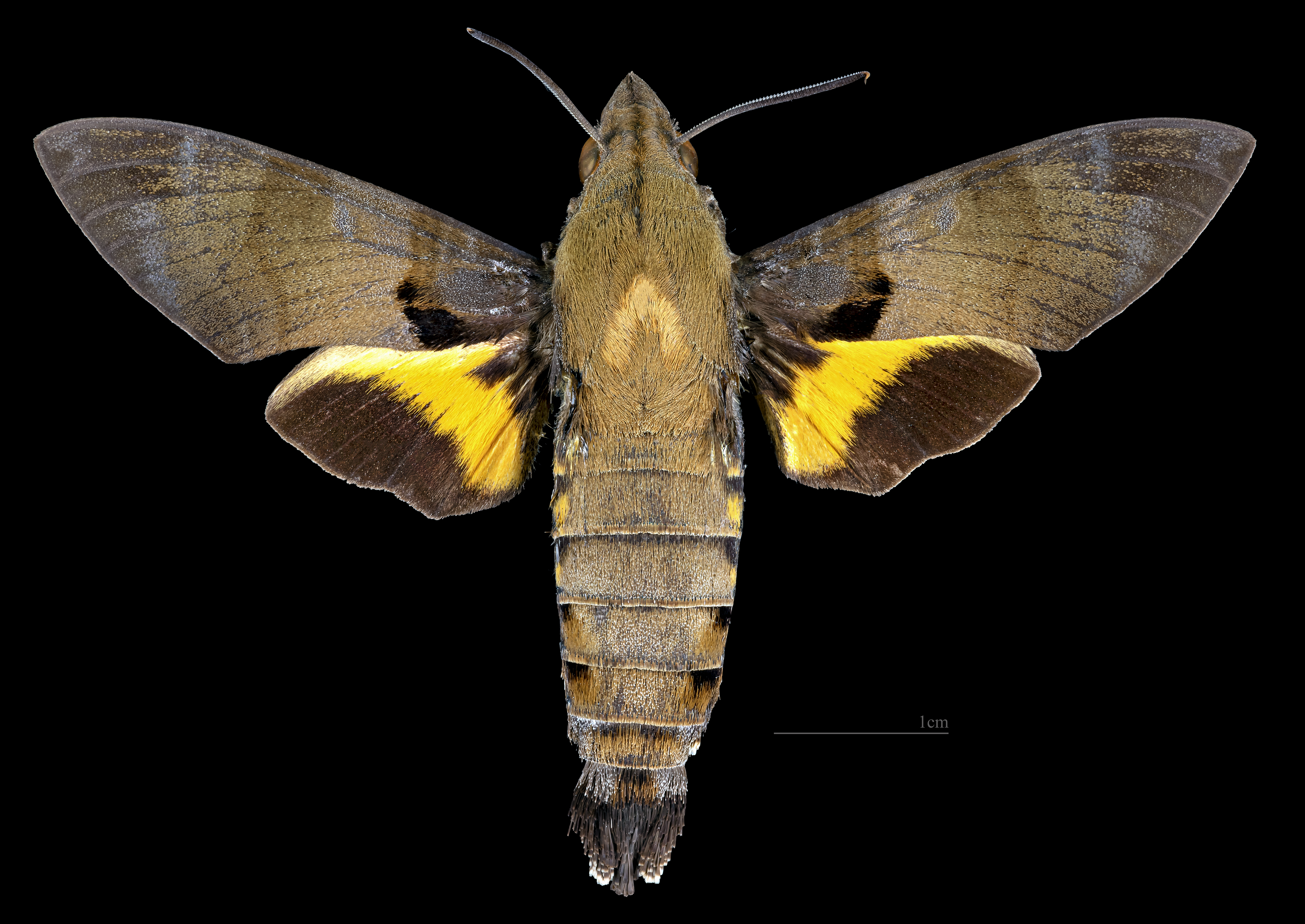
- Male dorsal
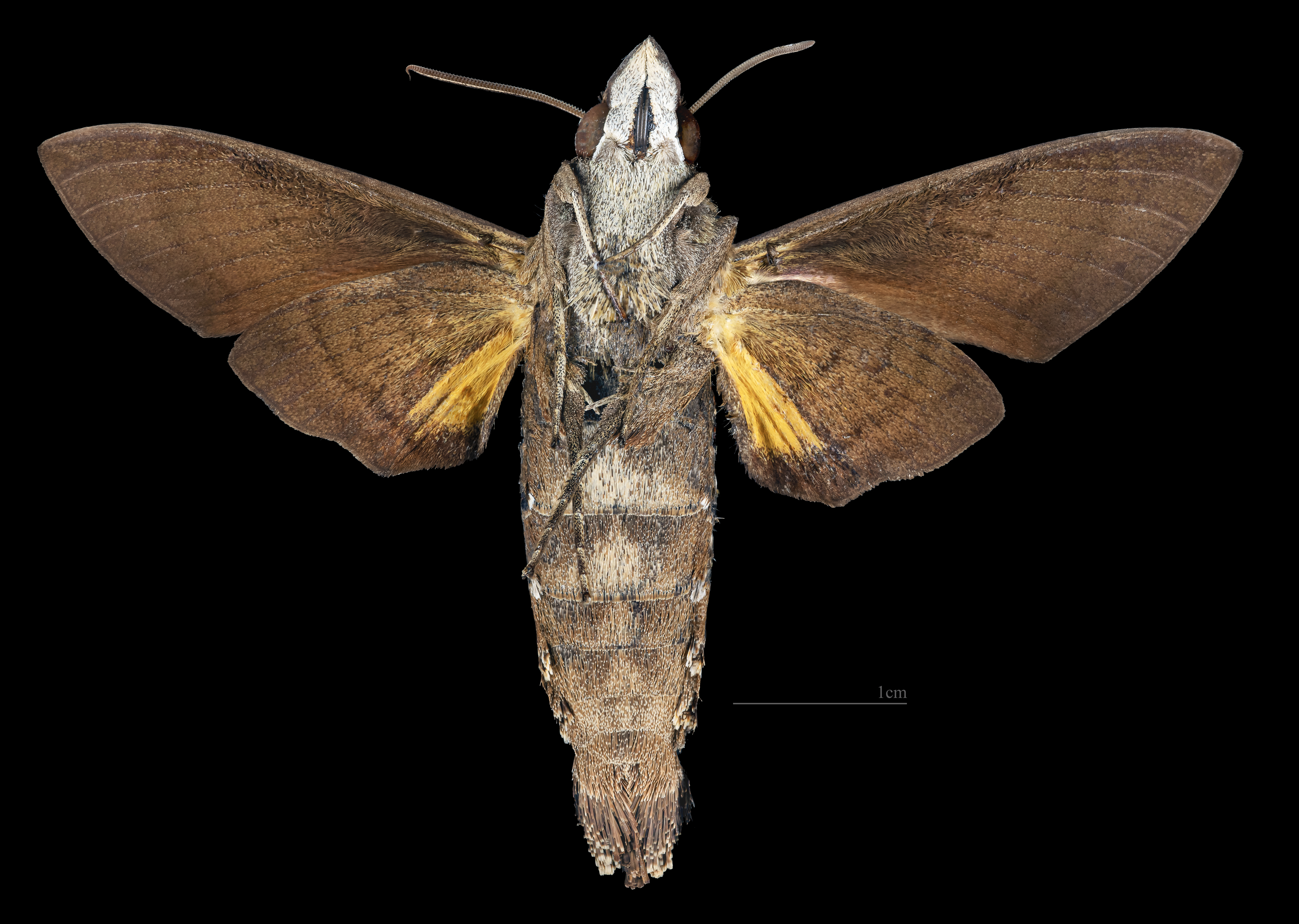
- Male ventral

Scientific classification
- Kingdom: Animalia
- Phylum: Arthropoda
- Class: Insecta
- Order: Lepidoptera
- Family: Sphingidae
- Genus: Macroglossum
- Species: M. semifasciata

Binomial name
- Macroglossum semifasciata Hampson, 1893

= Macroglossum semifasciata =

Species of moth

Macroglossum semifasciata, the half-banded hummingbird hawkmoth, is a moth of the family Sphingidae. It is known from north-eastern India, Myanmar, Thailand, south-western China, Vietnam, Malaysia (Peninsular, Sarawak) and Indonesia (Sumatra, Java, Kalimantan).
