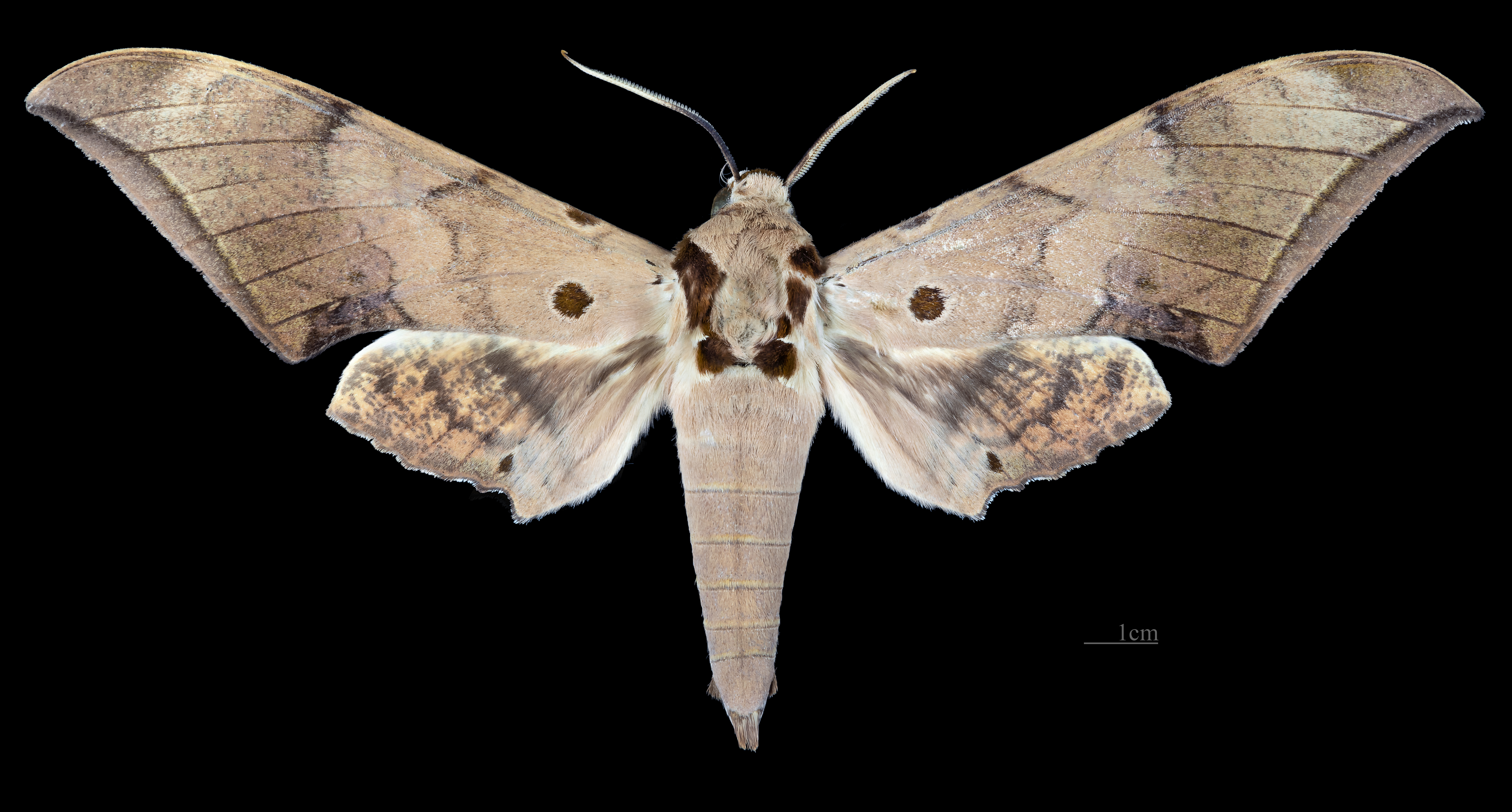
- Male dorsal
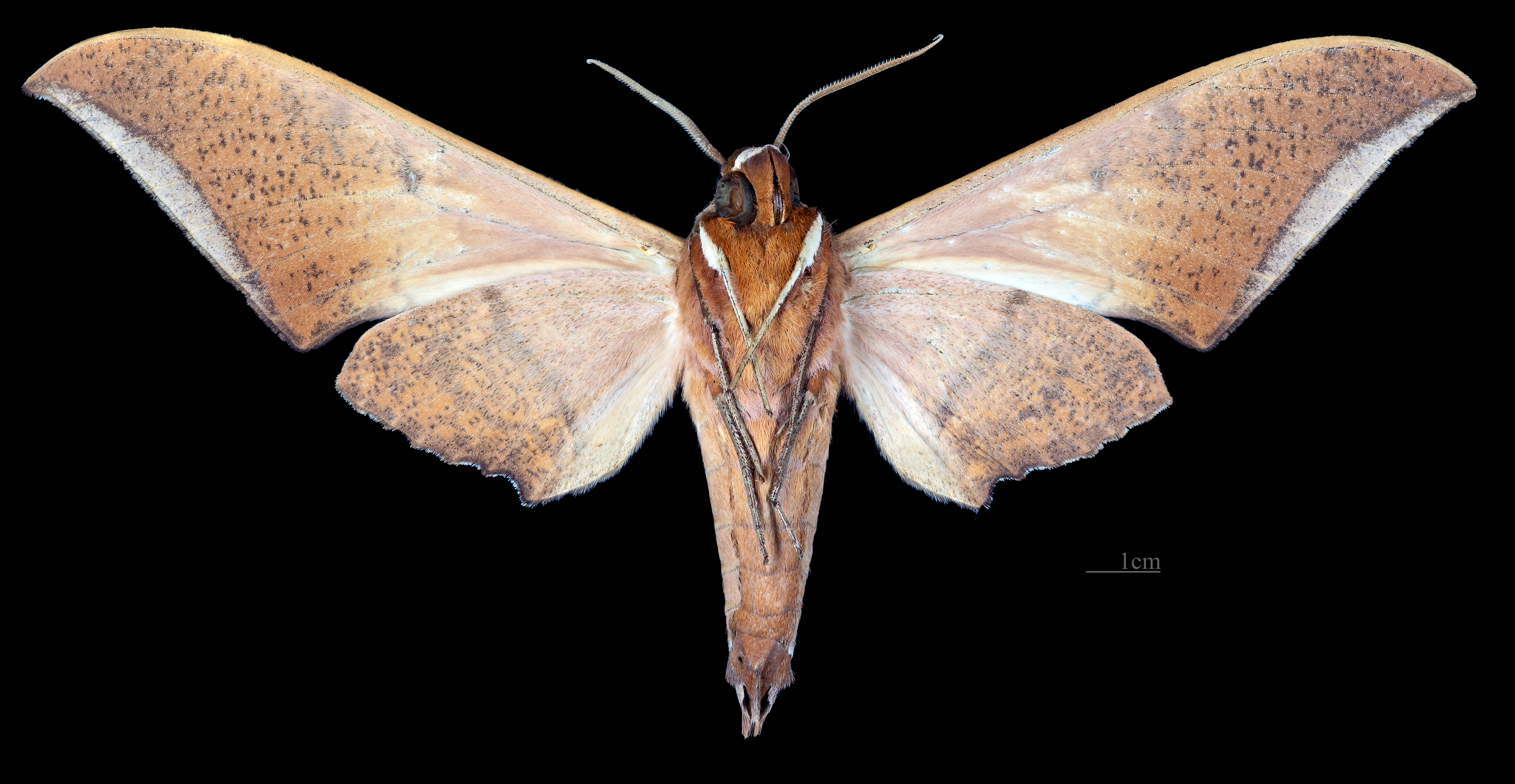
- Male ventral

Scientific classification
- Kingdom: Animalia
- Phylum: Arthropoda
- Class: Insecta
- Order: Lepidoptera
- Family: Sphingidae
- Genus: Ambulyx
- Species: A. matti

Binomial name
- Ambulyx matti (Jordan, 1923)

Synonyms
- Oxyambulyx matti Jordan, 1923

= Ambulyx matti =

Species of moth

Ambulyx matti is a species of moth of the family Sphingidae. It is known from India.
