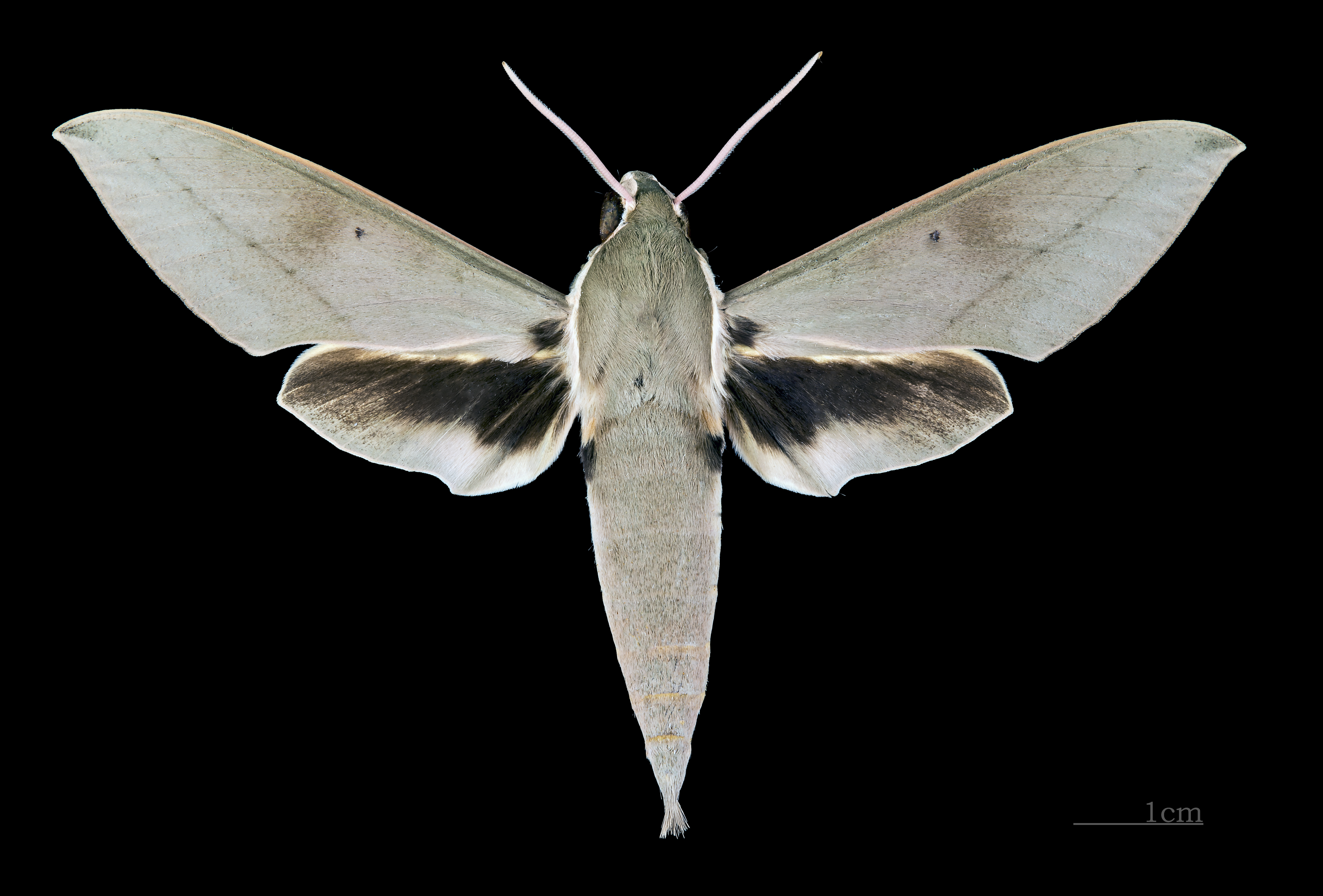
- Dorsal view - MHNT
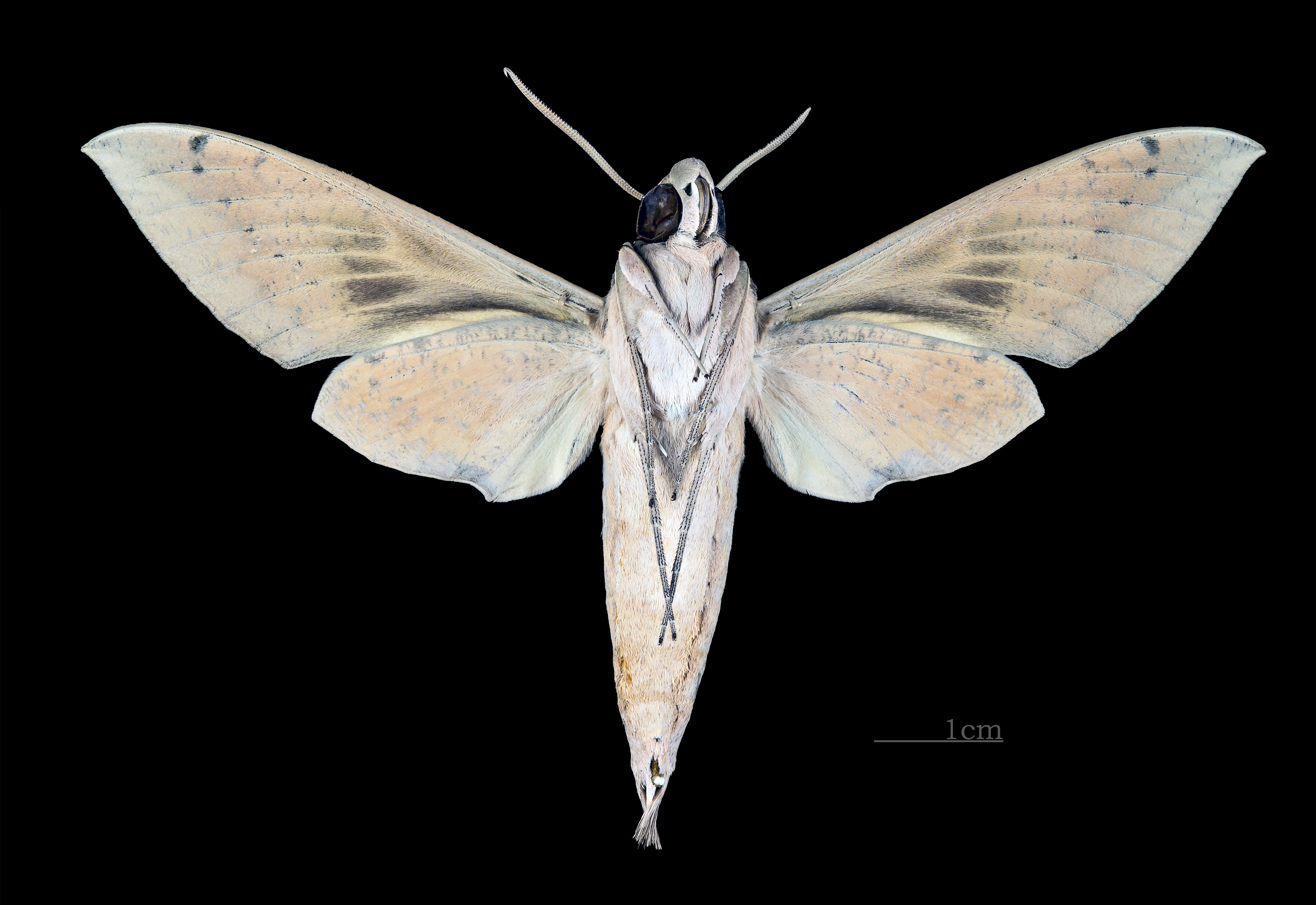
- Ventral view - MHNT

Scientific classification
- Kingdom: Animalia
- Phylum: Arthropoda
- Class: Insecta
- Order: Lepidoptera
- Family: Sphingidae
- Genus: Theretra
- Species: T. gnoma

Binomial name
- Theretra gnoma (Fabricius, 1775)

Synonyms
- Sphinx gnoma Fabricius, 1775; Sphinx butus Cramer, 1777; Chaerocampa gonograpta Butler, 1875

= Theretra gnoma =

Species of moth

Theretra gnoma is a moth of the family Sphingidae described by Johan Christian Fabricius in 1775. It is known from India, Sri Lanka, Myanmar, Nepal, Thailand, China.

== Description ==
It is very similar to Theretra clotho clotho, but paler. The hindwing upperside has a pale marginal area which is more extensive than in T. c. clotho, nearly as broad as in T. c. celata.

Forewings are longer with apex more pointed. Head and thorax are greenish. Abdomen with black lateral patches on the first segment. Ventral side of the ochreous. Hindwing smoky black area is reduced than T. clotho, and paler towards anal angle and outer margin. Larva is pale green or brown, speckled with dark striae. Ocellus on 4th somite is greenish, edged with yellow above, pink below with a lineal white center. Legs are pink and claspers are greenish.
