= Ambulyx tobii =

Scientific classification
- Kingdom: Animalia
- Phylum: Arthropoda
- Class: Insecta
- Order: Lepidoptera
- Family: Sphingidae
- Genus: Ambulyx
- Species: A. tobii

Binomial name
- Ambulyx tobii (Inoue, 1976)

Synonyms
- Oxyambulyx sericeipennis tobii Inoue, 1976

Species of moth

Ambulyx tobii is a species of moth of the family Sphingidae first described by Hiroshi Inoue in 1976. It is found from Japan and South Korea down through eastern China to Bhutan, Tibet, Yunnan, Vietnam and Taiwan.

The wingspan is 105–117 mm.
