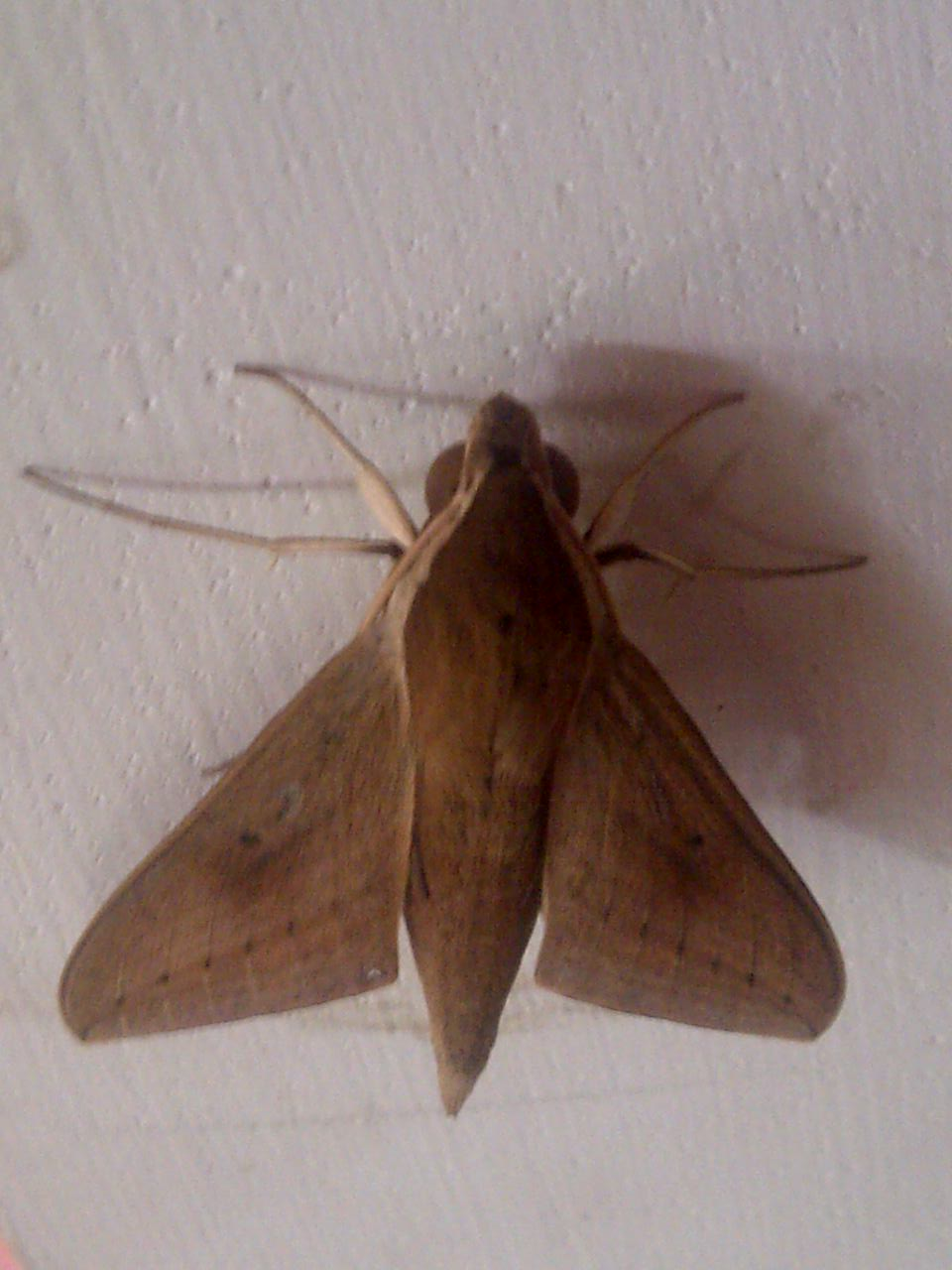
- Macroglossum regulus in Kerala

Scientific classification
- Kingdom: Animalia
- Phylum: Arthropoda
- Class: Insecta
- Order: Lepidoptera
- Family: Sphingidae
- Genus: Macroglossum
- Species: M. regulus

Binomial name
- Macroglossum regulus Boisduval, 1875

Synonyms
- Macroglossa fervens Butler, 1875

= Macroglossum regulus =

Species of moth

Macroglossum regulus is a moth of the family Sphingidae. It is known from India.

The upperside of the head, thorax, and first three abdominal segments is greenish. The abdomen upperside has large and confluent orange lateral spots on segments two to seven, the remaining segments are deep brownish black, with an uninterrupted belt of pure white at the base of the seventh. The thorax underside, the legs, the greater part of the first abdominal sternite and the mesial spot on the second and third are creamy. Both wing undersides are maize-coloured at the extreme base, otherwise coloured like the upperside of the hindwing. The hindwing upperside is chestnut-red.
