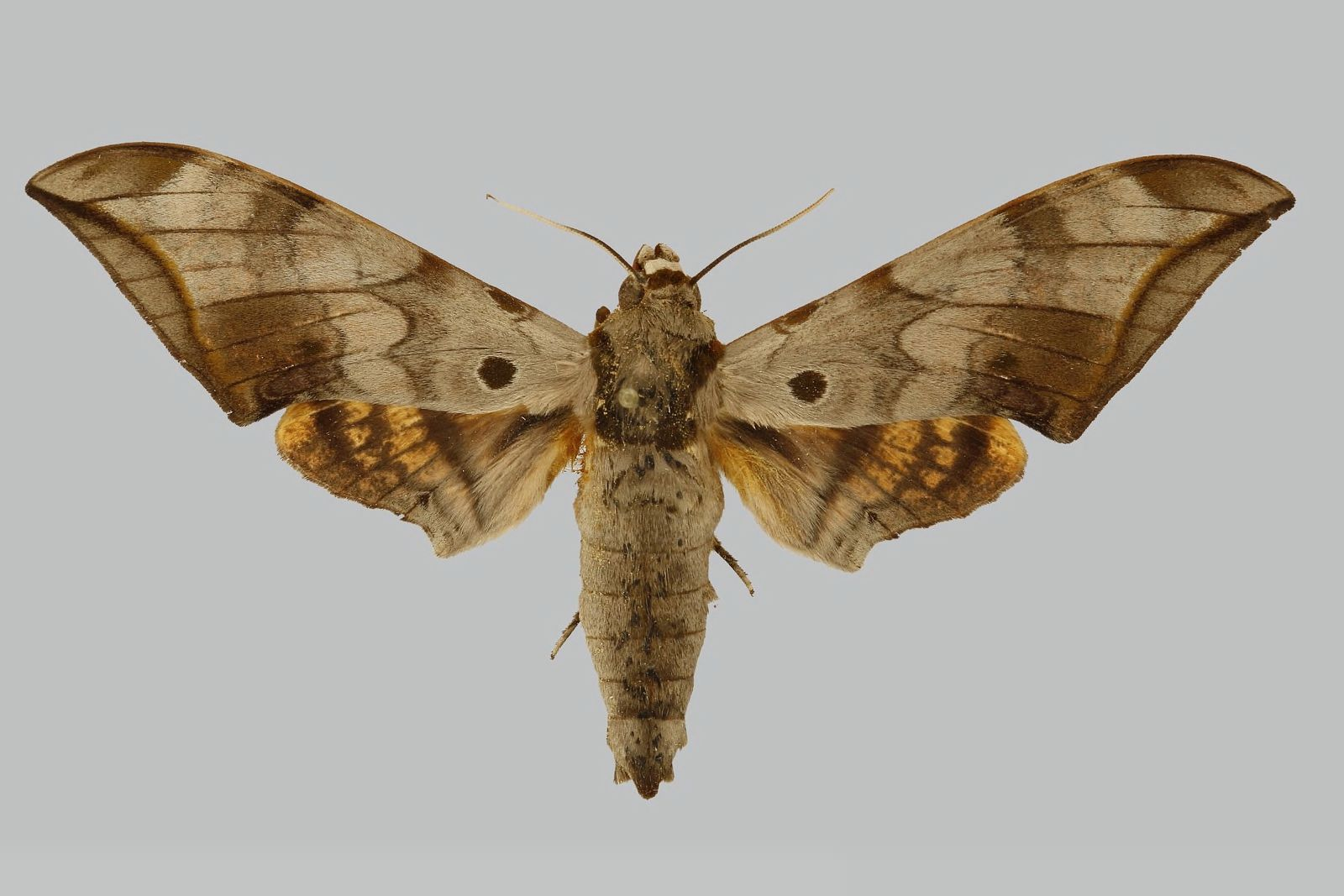
- Male

Scientific classification
- Kingdom: Animalia
- Phylum: Arthropoda
- Clade: Pancrustacea
- Class: Insecta
- Order: Lepidoptera
- Family: Sphingidae
- Genus: Ambulyx
- Species: A. lestradei

Binomial name
- Ambulyx lestradei Cadiou, 1998

= Ambulyx lestradei =

Species of moth

Ambulyx lestradei is a species of moth of the family Sphingidae. It is known from Sri Lanka.
