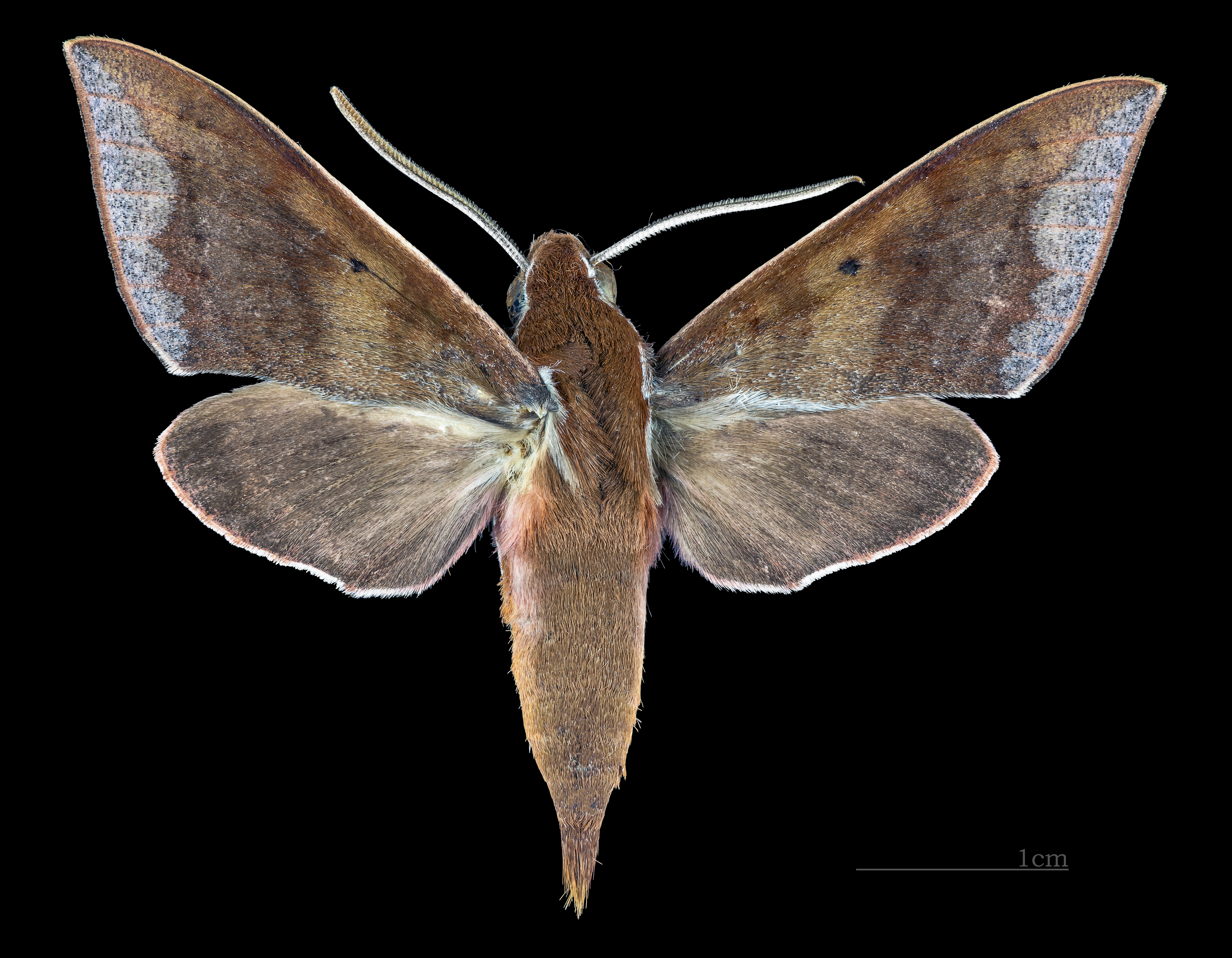
- Theretra castanea male dorsal
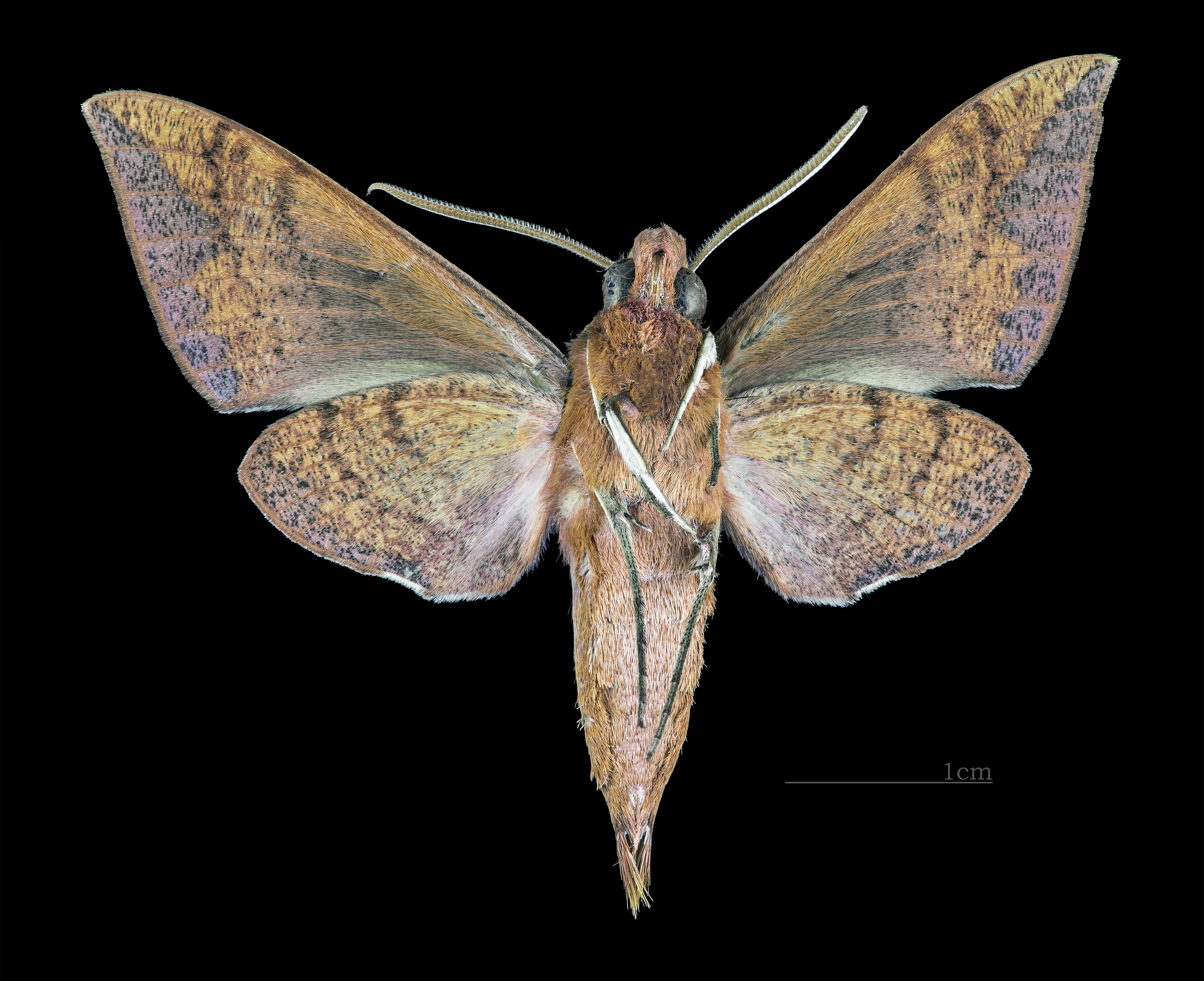
- Theretra castanea male ventral

Scientific classification
- Kingdom: Animalia
- Phylum: Arthropoda
- Class: Insecta
- Order: Lepidoptera
- Family: Sphingidae
- Genus: Theretra
- Species: T. castanea

Binomial name
- Theretra castanea (Moore, 1872)

Synonyms
- Pergesa castanea Moore, 1872; Theretra hyporhoda (Hampson, 1900); Theretra swinhoei (Clark, 1925); Theretra castanella Gehlen, 1942

= Theretra castanea =

Species of moth

Theretra castanea is a moth of the family Sphingidae. It is found in India.

The ground colour of both upperside and underside are very variable, the upperside sometimes more, sometimes less reddish, the underside varying from orange to pale tawny. The hindwing upperside is uniformly dark tawny-olive or blackish.
