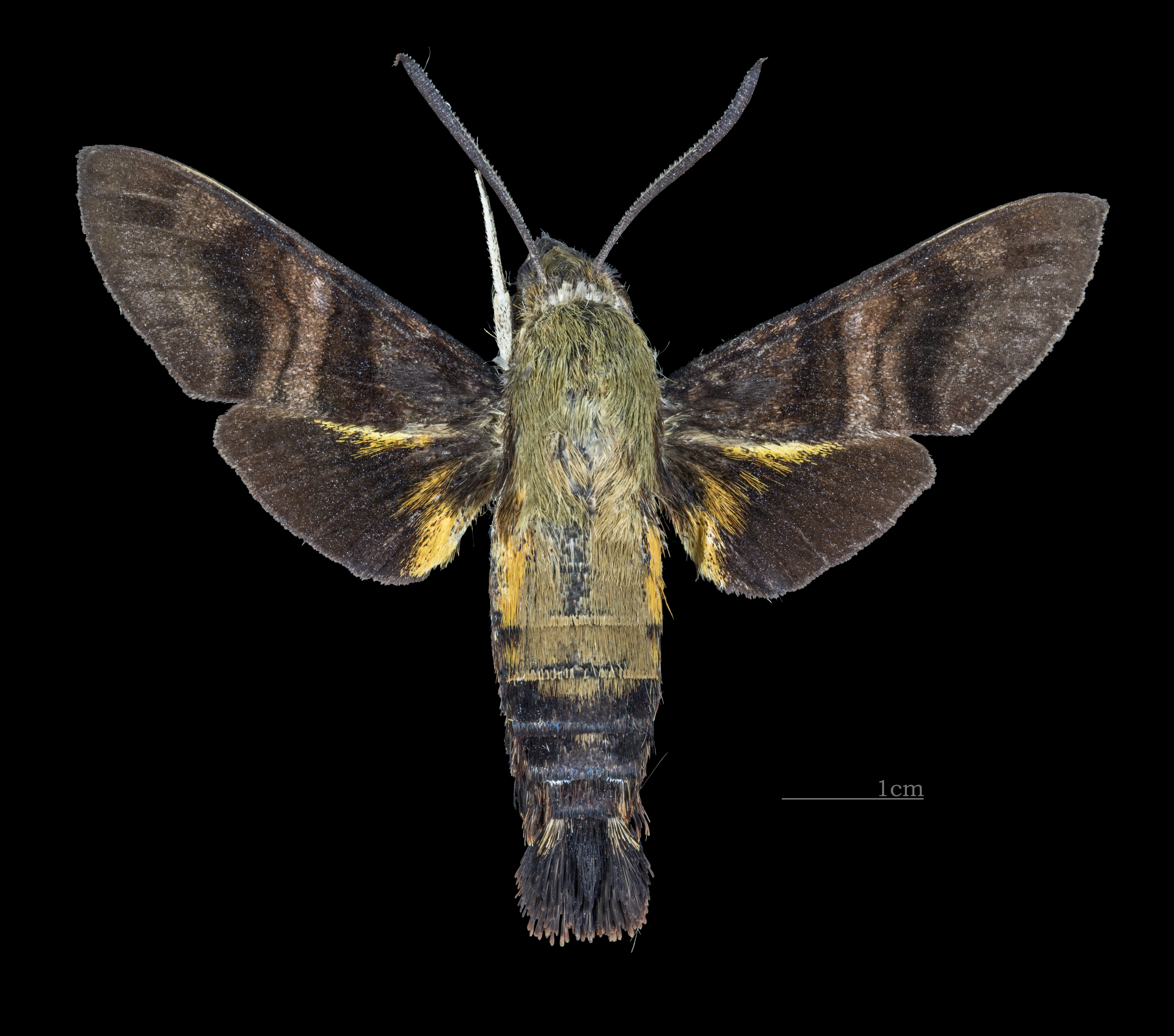
- Male dorsal
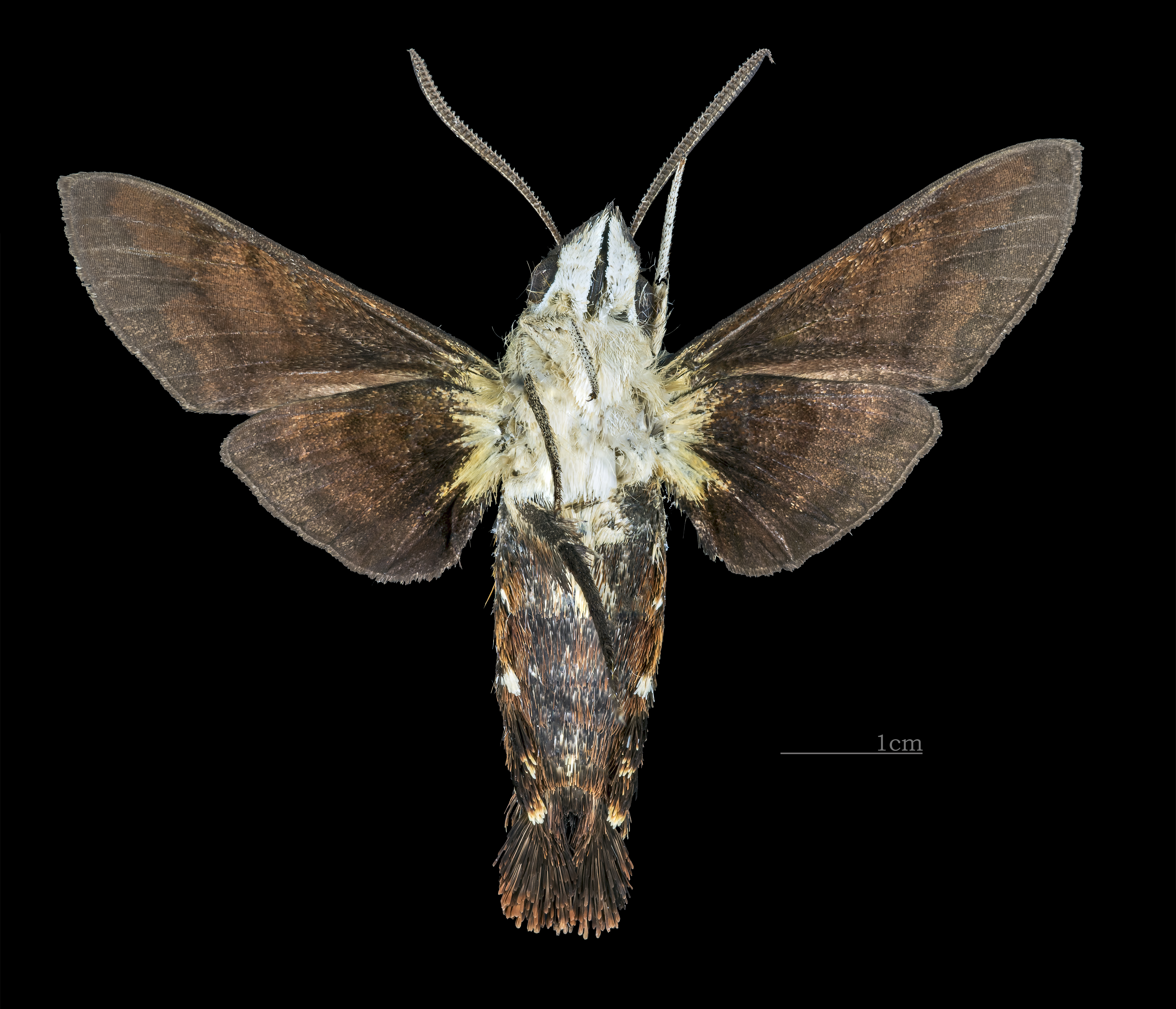
- Male ventral

Scientific classification
- Kingdom: Animalia
- Phylum: Arthropoda
- Class: Insecta
- Order: Lepidoptera
- Family: Sphingidae
- Genus: Macroglossum
- Species: M. avicula

Binomial name
- Macroglossum avicula Boisduval, 1875

Synonyms
- Macroglossa obscuripennis Butler, 1876

= Macroglossum avicula =

Species of moth

Macroglossum avicula is a moth of the family Sphingidae. It is known from Indonesia (including Sumatra and Java).
