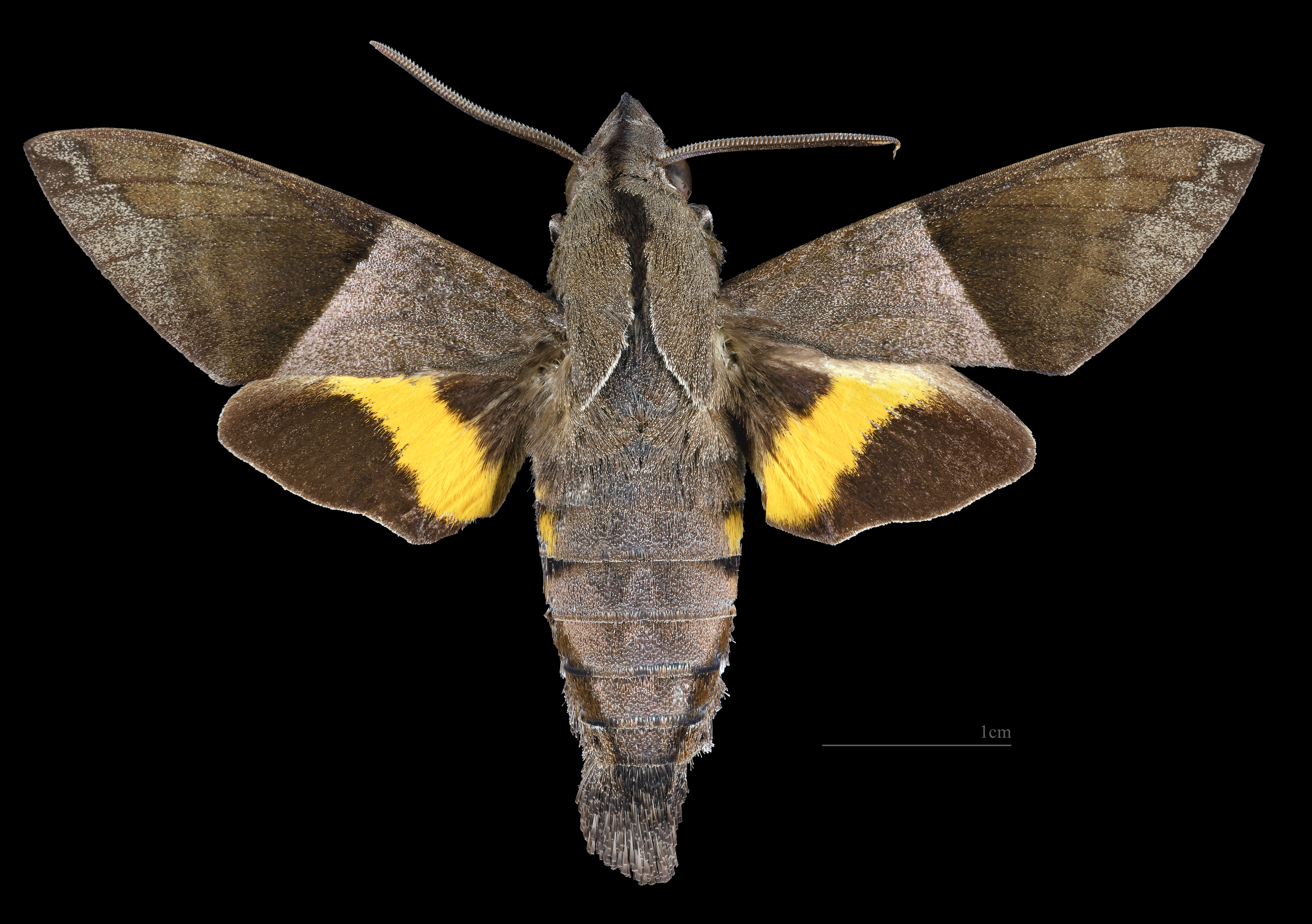
- Macroglossum hemichroma Male dorsal
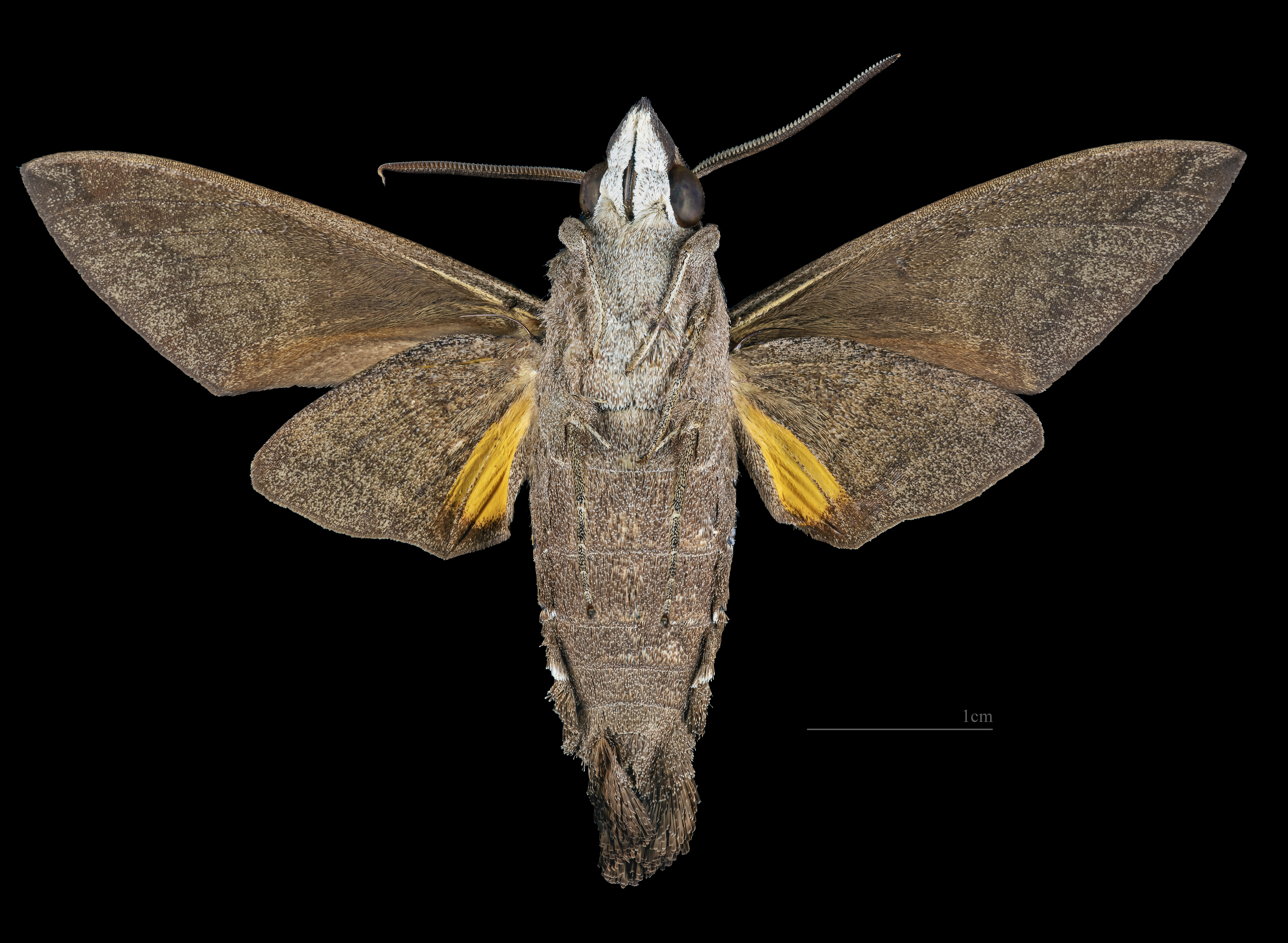
- Macroglossum hemichroma Male ventral

Scientific classification
- Kingdom: Animalia
- Phylum: Arthropoda
- Class: Insecta
- Order: Lepidoptera
- Family: Sphingidae
- Genus: Macroglossum
- Species: M. hemichroma

Binomial name
- Macroglossum hemichroma Butler, 1875

= Macroglossum hemichroma =

Species of moth

Macroglossum hemichroma is a moth of the family Sphingidae. It is known from Thailand, Vietnam and Indonesia (including Java and Sulawesi).

The head and thorax uppersides have a dark median line. The forewing upperside is sharply divided into pale proximal and darker distal parts, the dividing line running straight from the costal margin just proximal to the upper angle of the discal cell to the hind margin several millimetres proximal to the hind angle.
