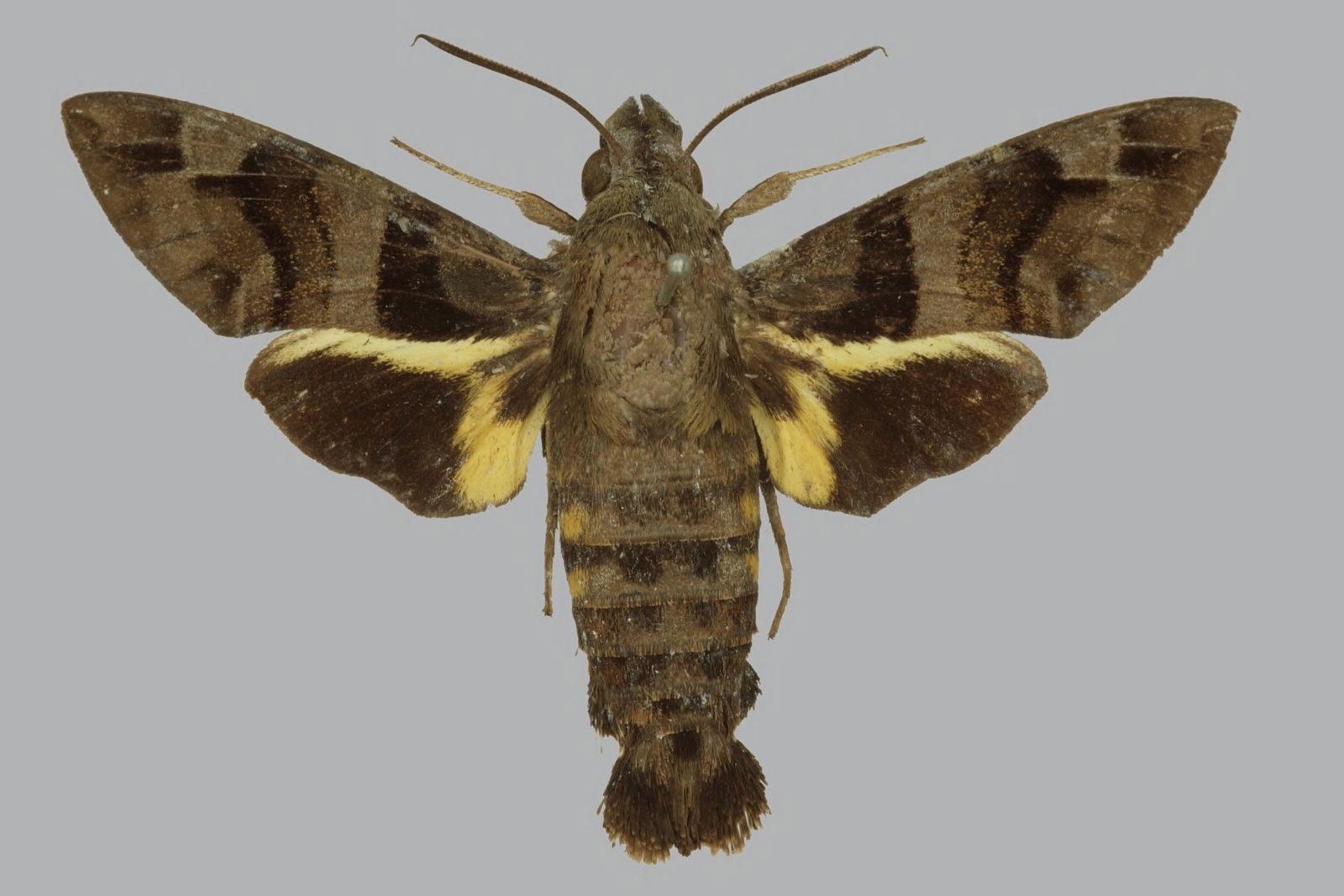

Scientific classification
- Kingdom: Animalia
- Phylum: Arthropoda
- Class: Insecta
- Order: Lepidoptera
- Family: Sphingidae
- Genus: Macroglossum
- Species: M. melas

Binomial name
- Macroglossum melas Rothschild & Jordan, 1903

= Macroglossum melas =

Species of moth

Macroglossum melas is a moth of the family Sphingidae. It is known from Indonesia, Papua New Guinea and the Solomon Islands.

It is similar to Macroglossum heliophila, but the body and wings have a much deeper colour and the upper- and undersides are almost black. The head upperside has a thin white line above the eye. The abdomen upperside has small yellow spots. The underside of the palpus, middle of the thorax and mesial patches of the abdomen are white and the side tufts of the abdomen are white-tipped. The forewing upperside is slightly variable. Both wings undersides are grey at the extreme base.

== Subspecies ==
- Macroglossum melas melas
- Macroglossum melas moriolum Rothschild & Jordan, 1916 (Salomon Islands)
- Macroglossum melas pullius Jordan, 1930 (Papua New Guinea)
