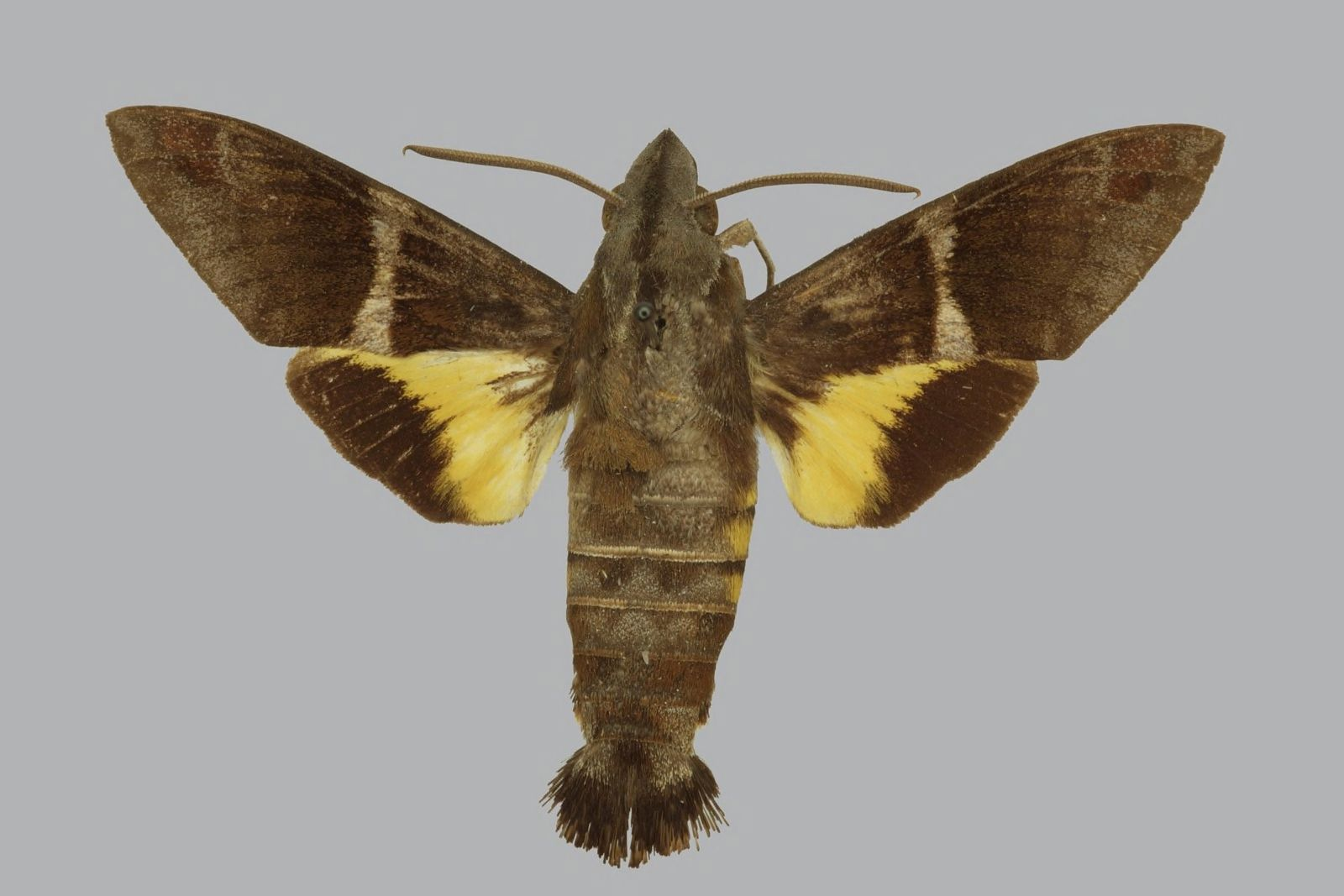
- Male

Scientific classification
- Kingdom: Animalia
- Phylum: Arthropoda
- Class: Insecta
- Order: Lepidoptera
- Family: Sphingidae
- Genus: Macroglossum
- Species: M. mediovitta

Binomial name
- Macroglossum mediovitta Rothschild & Jordan, 1903

= Macroglossum mediovitta =

Species of moth

Macroglossum mediovitta is a moth of the family Sphingidae. It is found from southern Japan (Ryukyu Archipelago), Taiwan and southern China (Hong Kong) south through Thailand and Malaysia (Peninsular, Sarawak) to Indonesia (Sumatra, Kalimantan).

It is similar to Macroglossum heliophila, but the forewings are more elongate and the distal margin is less convex.

Adults are attracted to the flowers of Duranta erecta. They are on wing at dawn and dusk.
