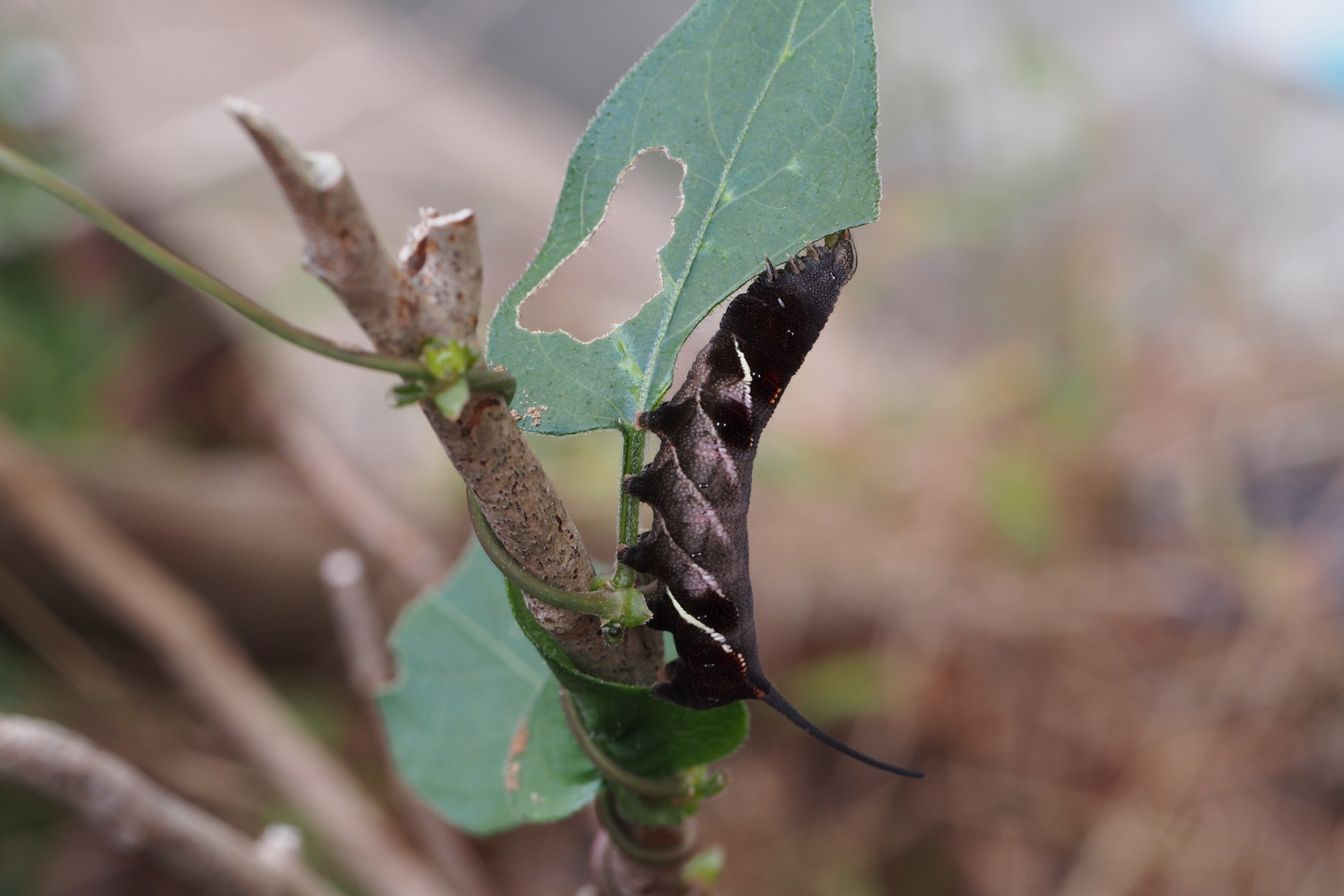

Scientific classification
- Kingdom: Animalia
- Phylum: Arthropoda
- Class: Insecta
- Order: Lepidoptera
- Family: Sphingidae
- Genus: Neogurelca
- Species: N. himachala

Binomial name
- Neogurelca himachala (Butler, 1876)

Synonyms
- Lophura himachala Butler, 1876; Lophura erebina Butler, 1876; Gurelca himachala purpureosignata Closs, 1917

= Neogurelca himachala =

Species of moth

Neogurelca himachala, the crisp-banded hawkmoth, is a moth of the family Sphingidae. It is known from Nepal, north-eastern India, south-western, central and eastern China (including Tibet), northern Thailand, Taiwan, North Korea, South Korea and Japan.

The wingspan is about 34–48 mm.

The larvae have been recorded feeding on Paederia foetida in India and Paederia species in China

== Subspecies ==
- Neogurelca himachala himachala (Nepal, north-eastern India, south-western China (including Tibet) and northern Thailand)
- Neogurelca himachala sangaica Butler, 1876 (central and eastern China, Taiwan, North Korea, South Korea and Japan)
