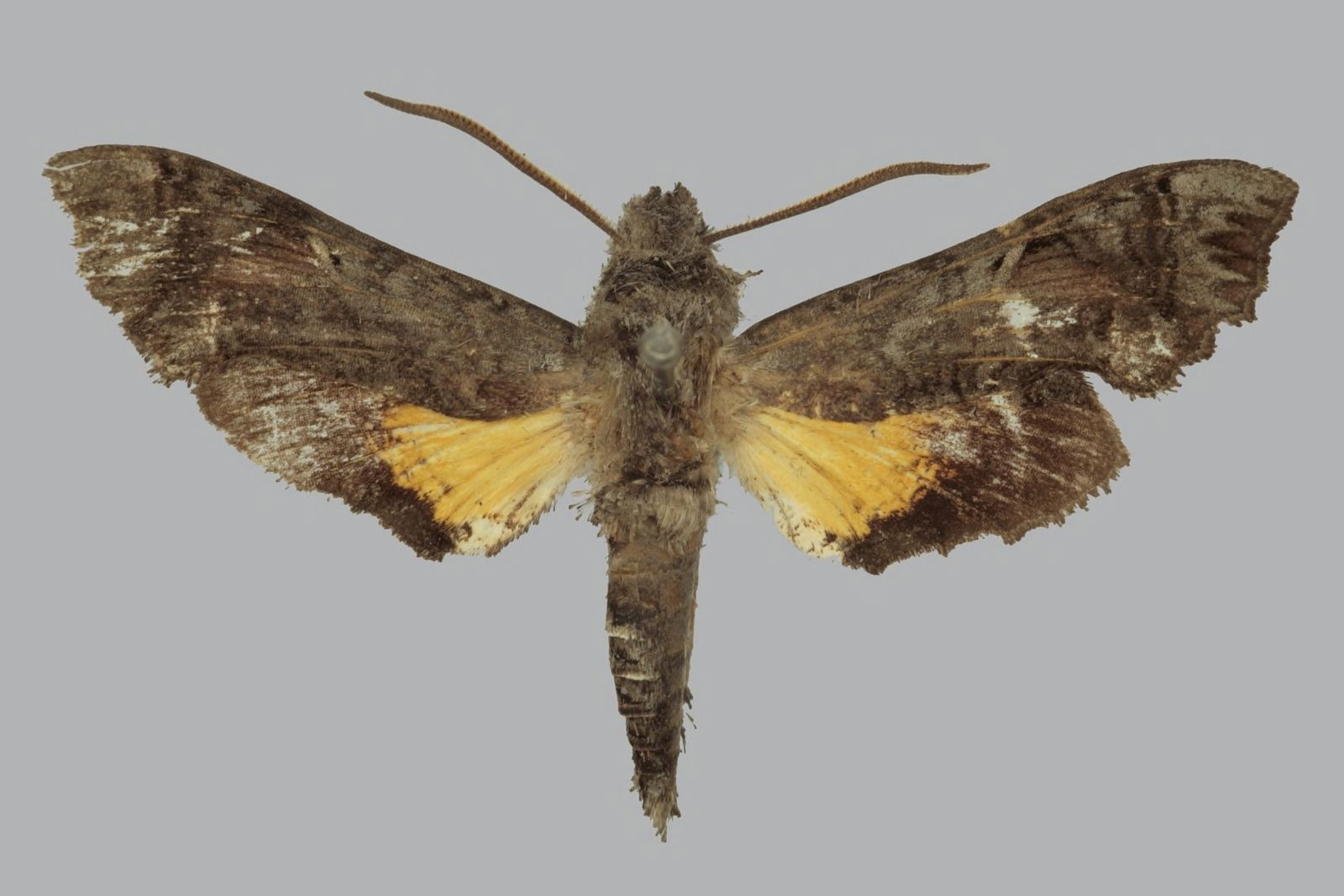

Scientific classification
- Kingdom: Animalia
- Phylum: Arthropoda
- Class: Insecta
- Order: Lepidoptera
- Family: Sphingidae
- Genus: Neogurelca
- Species: N. montana

Binomial name
- Neogurelca montana (Rothschild & Jordan, 1915)

Synonyms
- Gurelca montana Rothschild & Jordan, 1915; Gurelca saturata Mell, 1922

= Neogurelca montana =

Species of moth

Neogurelca montana, the narrow-banded hawkmoth, is a moth of the family Sphingidae. It is known from central and south-western China.

The wingspan is about 44 mm. Adults are on wing from July to October.

The larvae have been recorded feeding on Paederia tomentosa.
