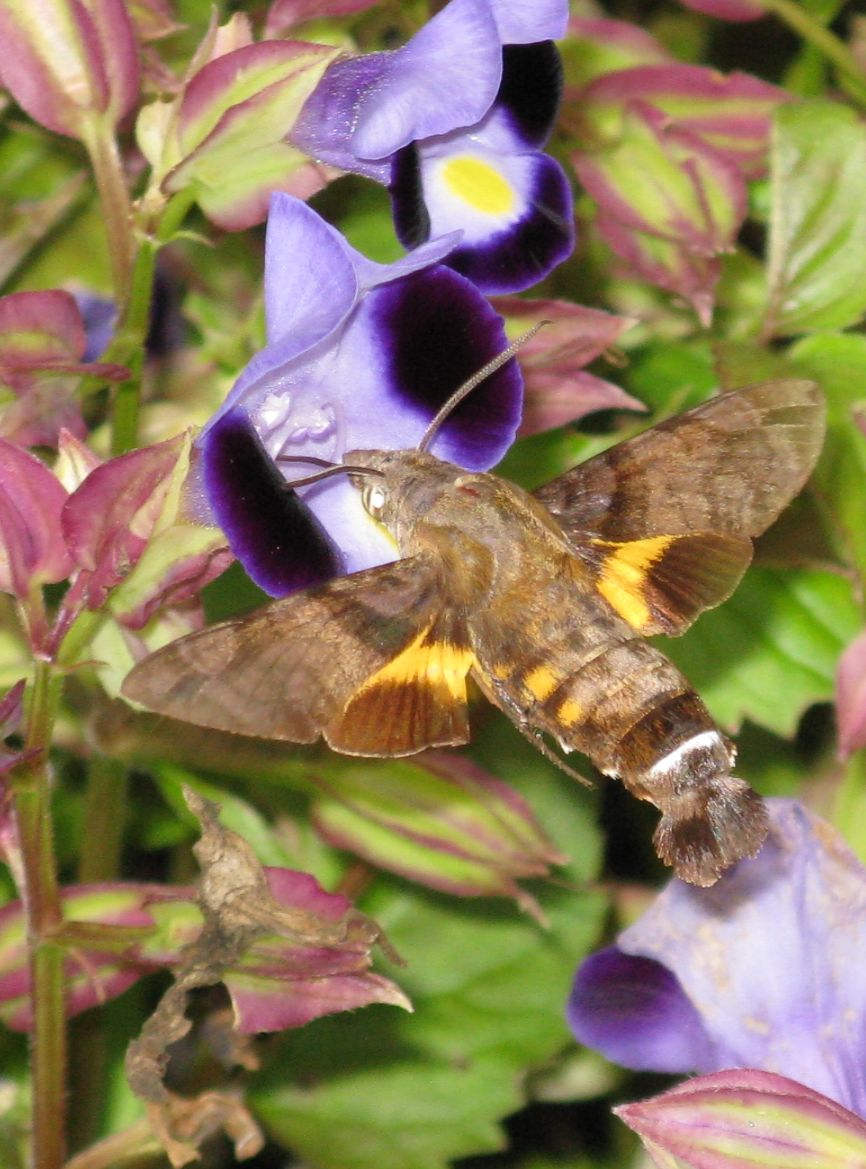

Scientific classification
- Kingdom: Animalia
- Phylum: Arthropoda
- Clade: Pancrustacea
- Class: Insecta
- Order: Lepidoptera
- Family: Sphingidae
- Genus: Macroglossum
- Species: M. pyrrhosticta

Binomial name
- Macroglossum pyrrhosticta Butler, 1875

Synonyms
- Macroglossum pyrrhostictum; Macroglossa catapyrrha Butler, 1875; Macroglossum pyrrhosticta albifascia (Mell, 1922); Macroglossum pyrrhosticta ferrea (Mell, 1922); Macroglossum fukienensis Chu & Wang, 1980

= Macroglossum pyrrhosticta =

Species of moth

Macroglossum pyrrhosticta, the maile pilau hornworm or burnt-spot hummingbird hawkmoth, is a hawk moth of the family Sphingidae. The species was first described by Arthur Gardiner Butler in 1875.

== Distribution ==
It is found in Sri Lanka, eastern India, Nepal, Thailand, central and eastern China, South Korea, North Korea, Japan, the southern Russian Far East, Taiwan, the Philippines (Luzon), eastern Malaysia and Indonesia. It is also an introduced species in Hawaii.

== Description ==
The wingspan is 42–56 mm. Adults are on wing from April to August in Hawaii and from late June to late October in Korea.

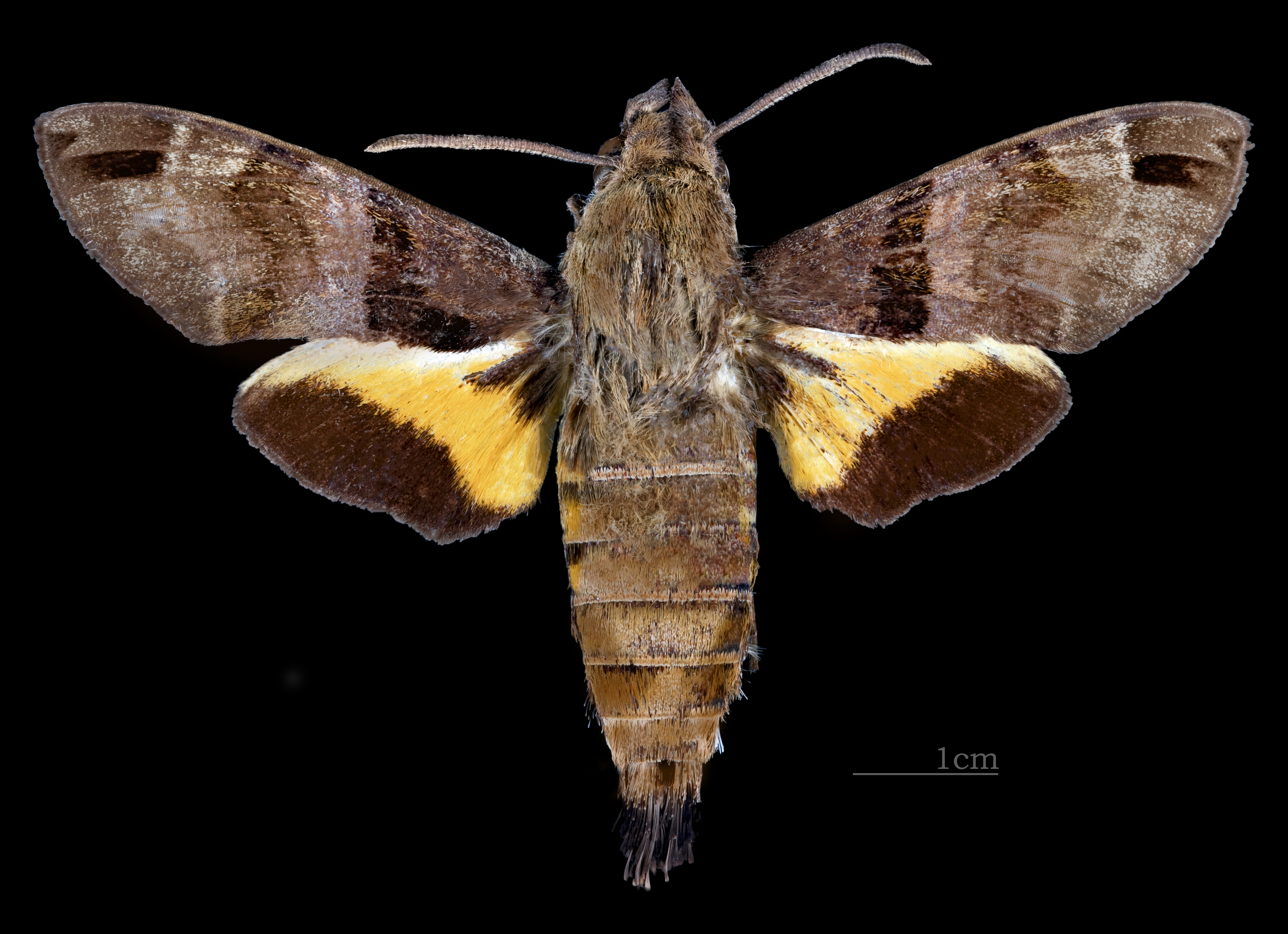
Male dorsal

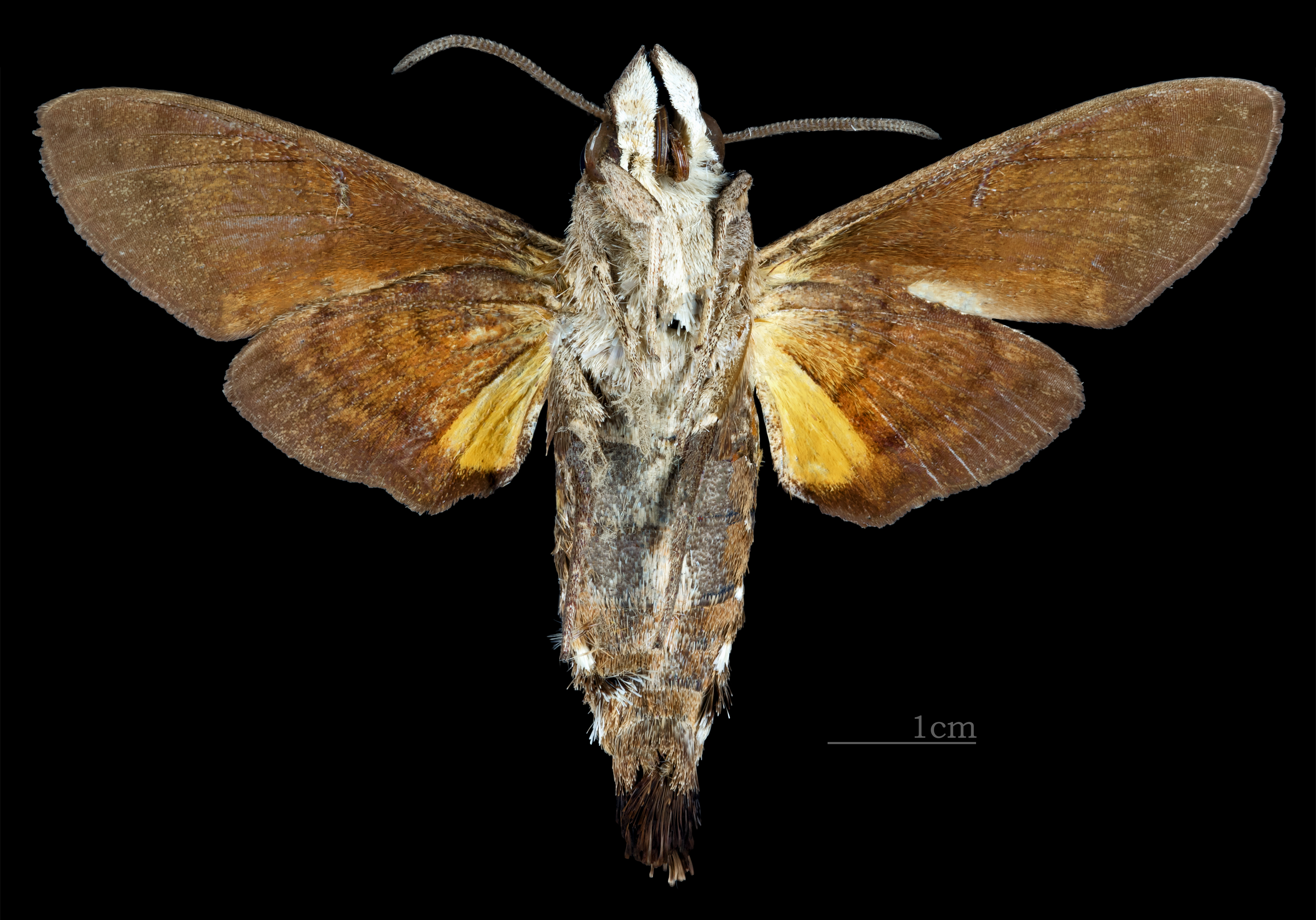
Male ventral

Pollen gathering activity in Japan

== Biology ==
Larvae have been recorded on Paederia scandens, Psychotria rubra, Paederia foetida and Paederia tomentosa.
