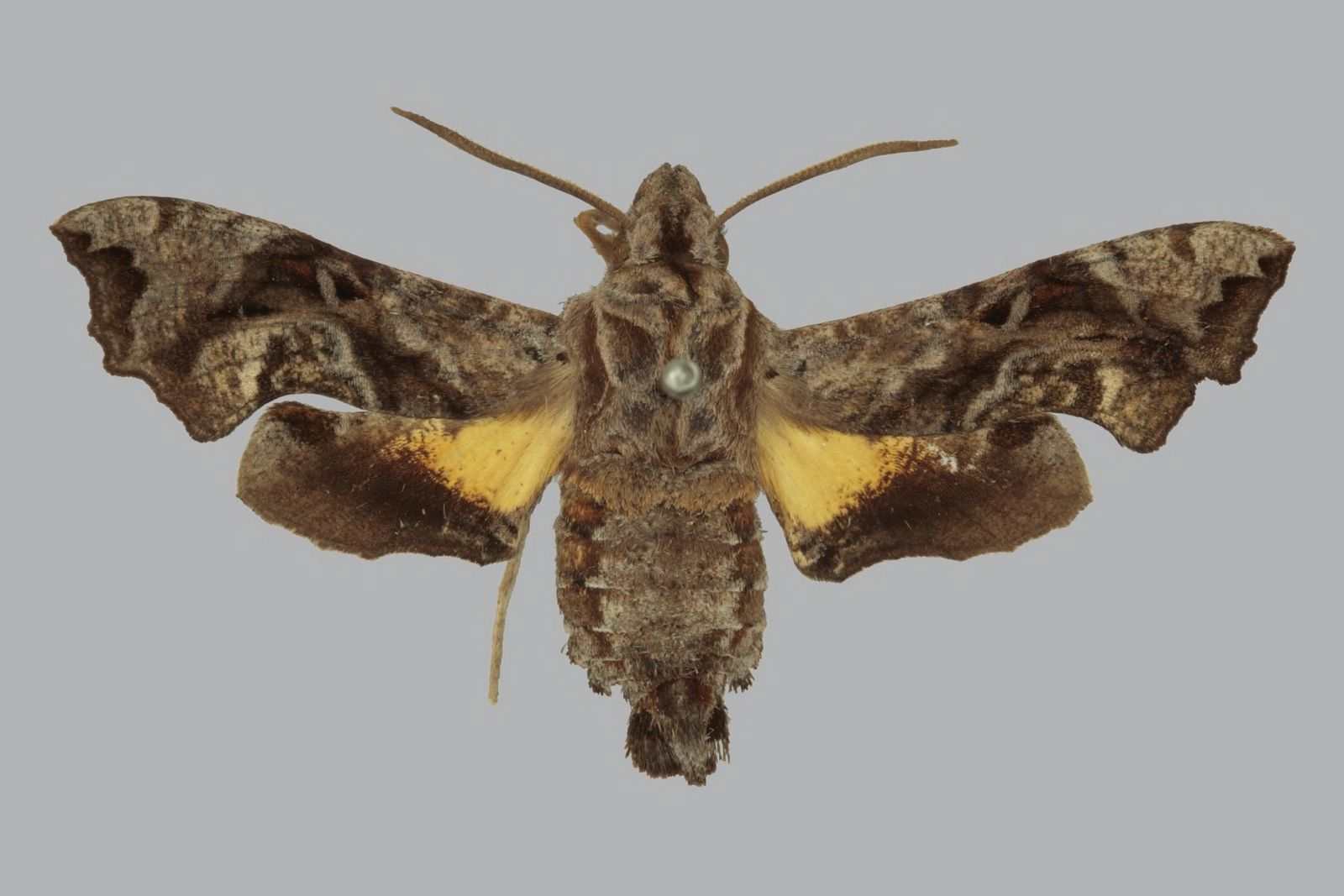

Scientific classification
- Kingdom: Animalia
- Phylum: Arthropoda
- Class: Insecta
- Order: Lepidoptera
- Family: Sphingidae
- Genus: Neogurelca
- Species: N. masuriensis

Binomial name
- Neogurelca masuriensis (Butler, 1875)

Synonyms
- Lophura masuriensis Butler, 1875

= Neogurelca masuriensis =

Species of moth

Neogurelca masuriensis, the diffuse-banded hawkmoth, is a moth of the family Sphingidae. It is found from north-western India along the southern Himalaya of northern India.

The wingspan is 42–50 mm.

The larvae have been recorded feeding on Leptodermis lanceolata.
