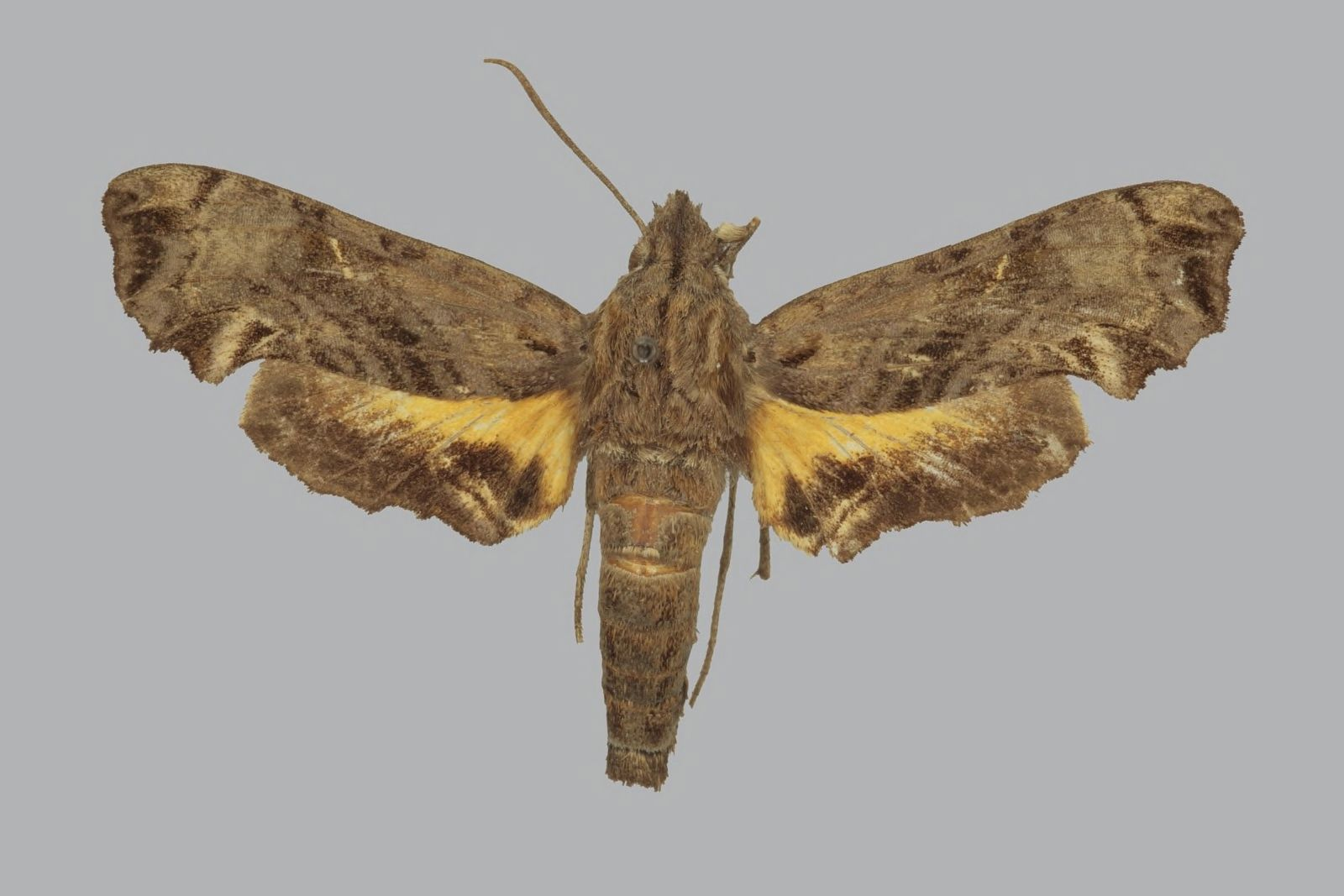

Scientific classification
- Kingdom: Animalia
- Phylum: Arthropoda
- Class: Insecta
- Order: Lepidoptera
- Family: Sphingidae
- Genus: Neogurelca
- Species: N. sonorensis

Binomial name
- Neogurelca sonorensis (Clark, 1919)

Synonyms
- Gurelca sonorensis Clark, 1919

= Neogurelca sonorensis =

Species of moth

Neogurelca sonorensis is a moth of the family Sphingidae. It is known from Mexico.
