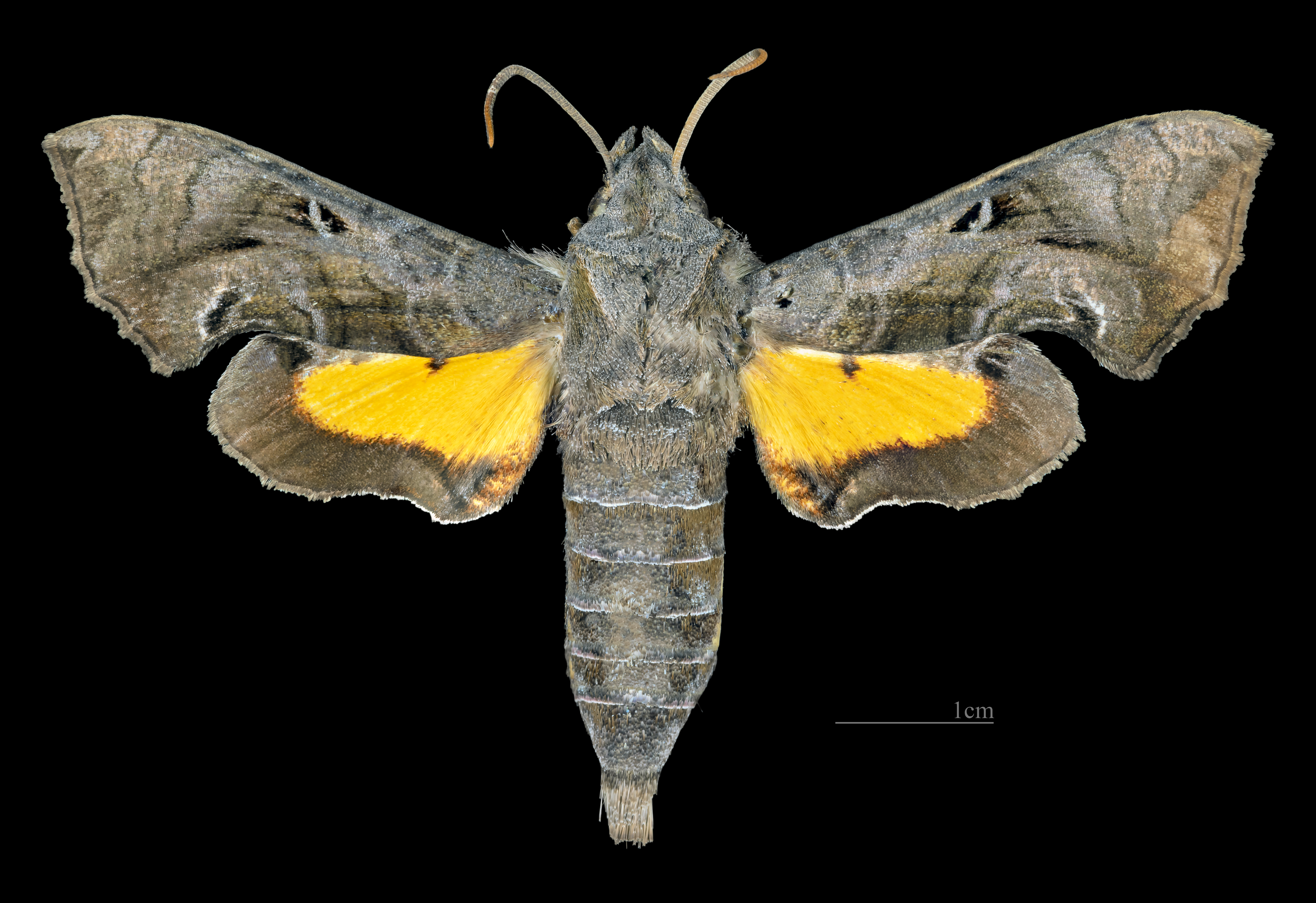
- Neogurelca hyas

Scientific classification
- Domain: Eukaryota
- Kingdom: Animalia
- Phylum: Arthropoda
- Class: Insecta
- Order: Lepidoptera
- Family: Sphingidae
- Subfamily: Macroglossinae
- Tribe: Macroglossini
- Subtribe: Macroglossina
- Genus: Neogurelca; Hogenes & Treadaway, 1993

= Neogurelca =

Genus of moths

Neogurelca is a genus of moths in the family Sphingidae. The genus was described by Willem Hogenes and Colin G. Treadaway in 1993.

== Species ==
- Neogurelca himachala (Butler, 1876)
- Neogurelca hyas (Walker, 1856)
- Neogurelca masuriensis (Butler, 1875)
- Neogurelca montana (Rothschild & Jordan, 1915)
- Neogurelca mulleri (Clark, 1923)
- Neogurelca sonorensis (Clark, 1919)
