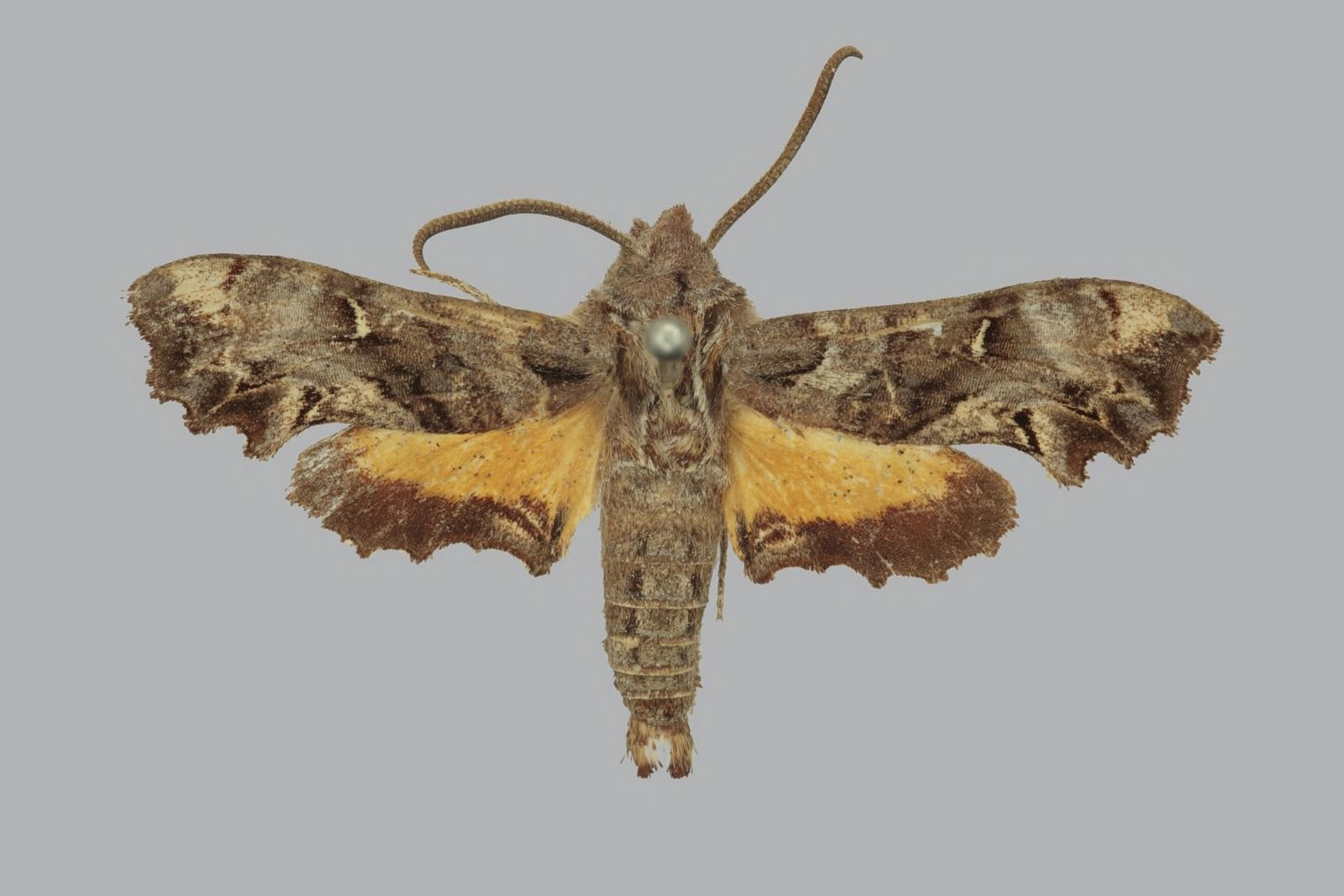

Scientific classification
- Kingdom: Animalia
- Phylum: Arthropoda
- Class: Insecta
- Order: Lepidoptera
- Family: Sphingidae
- Genus: Neogurelca
- Species: N. mulleri

Binomial name
- Neogurelca mulleri (Clark, 1923)

Synonyms
- Gurelca mulleri Clark, 1923

= Neogurelca mulleri =

Species of moth

Neogurelca mulleri is a moth of the family Sphingidae. It is known from Mexico.
