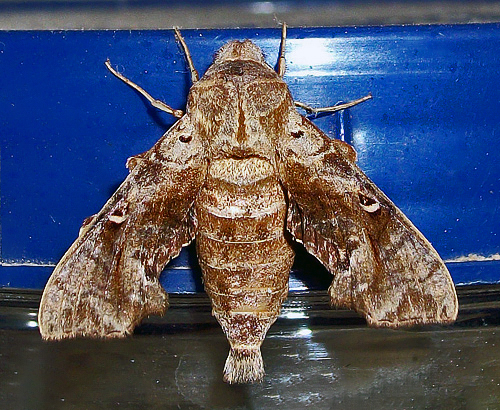
- In Mangaon, Maharashtra, India

Scientific classification
- Kingdom: Animalia
- Phylum: Arthropoda
- Class: Insecta
- Order: Lepidoptera
- Family: Sphingidae
- Genus: Neogurelca
- Species: N. hyas

Binomial name
- Neogurelca hyas (Walker, 1856)

Synonyms
- Lophura hyas Walker, 1856; Perigonia macroglossoides Walker, 1866; Macroglossum geometricum Moore, 1858; Gurelca hyas conspicua Mell, 1922

= Neogurelca hyas =

Species of moth

Neogurelca hyas, the even-banded hawkmoth, is a moth of the family Sphingidae first described by Francis Walker in 1856.

== Distribution ==
It is known from India, Sri Lanka, Nepal, Myanmar, central and southern China, Taiwan, southern Japan, Thailand, Vietnam, Malaysia (Peninsular), Indonesia (Sumatra, Java) and the Philippines.

== Description ==
The wingspan is 34–40 mm.

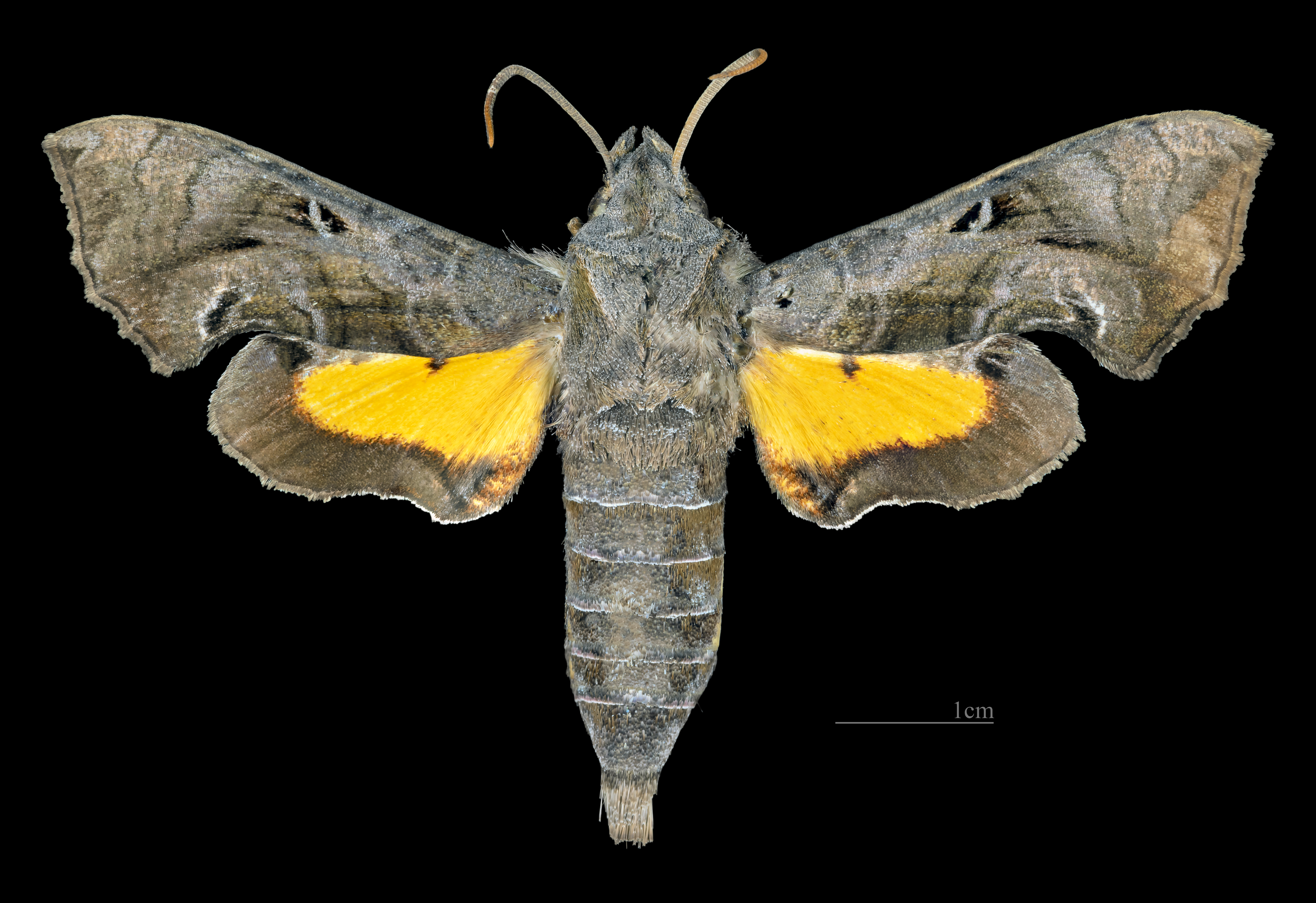
Male dorsal

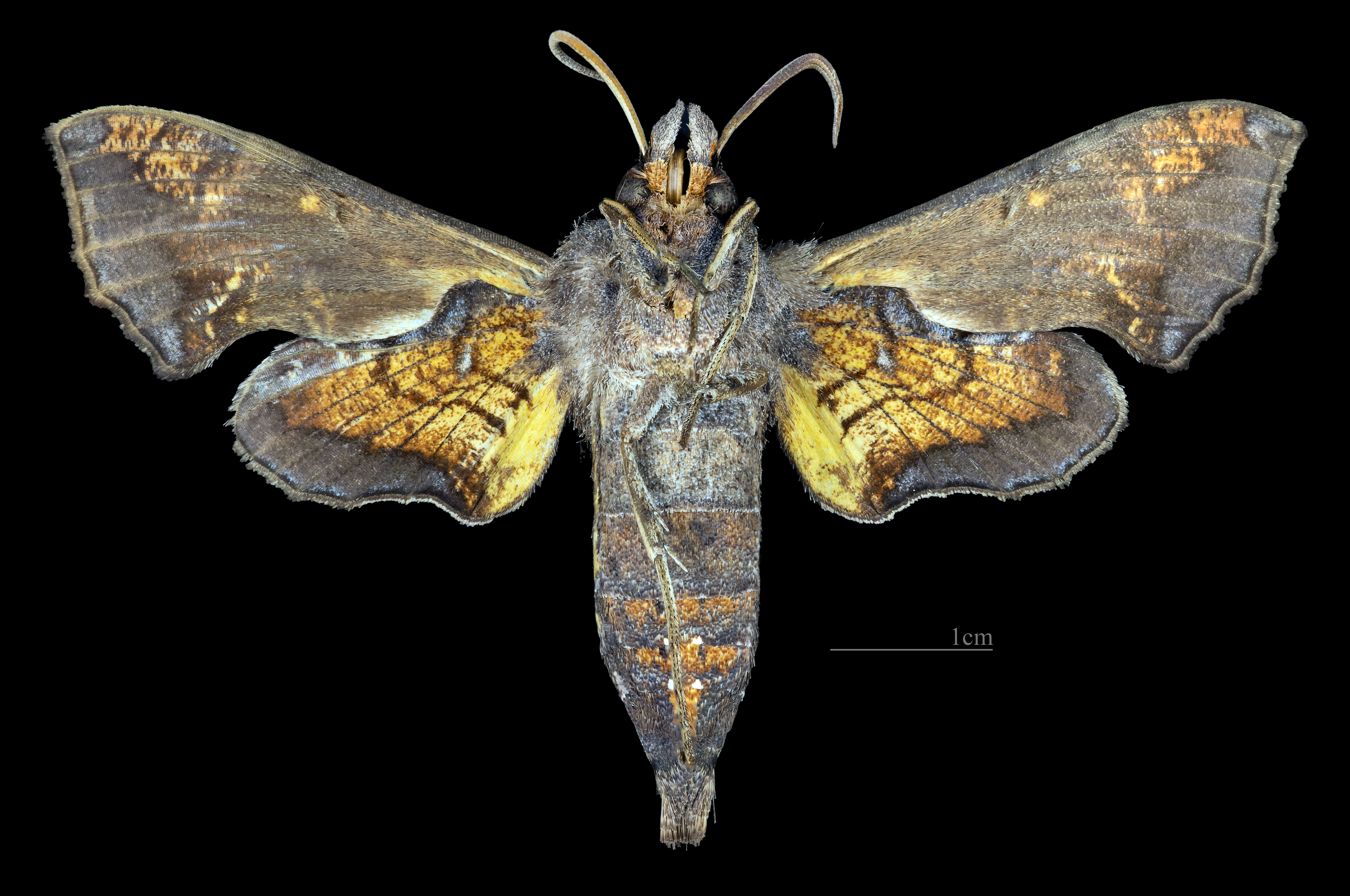
Male ventral

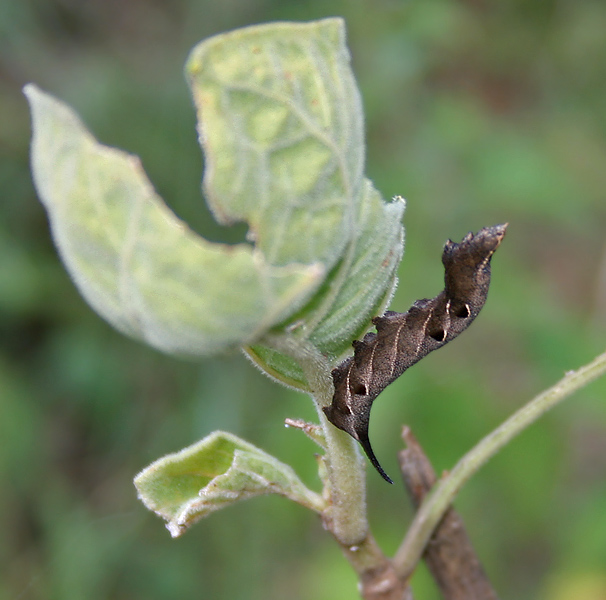
Brun form of caterpillar

== Biology ==
It is a crepuscular species which visits flowers, such as Duranta erecta in Hong Kong, before it is fully dark. The larvae have been recorded feeding on Paederia scandens and Serissa foetida in southern China, Paederia foetida in northeastern India and Morinda species in southern India.
