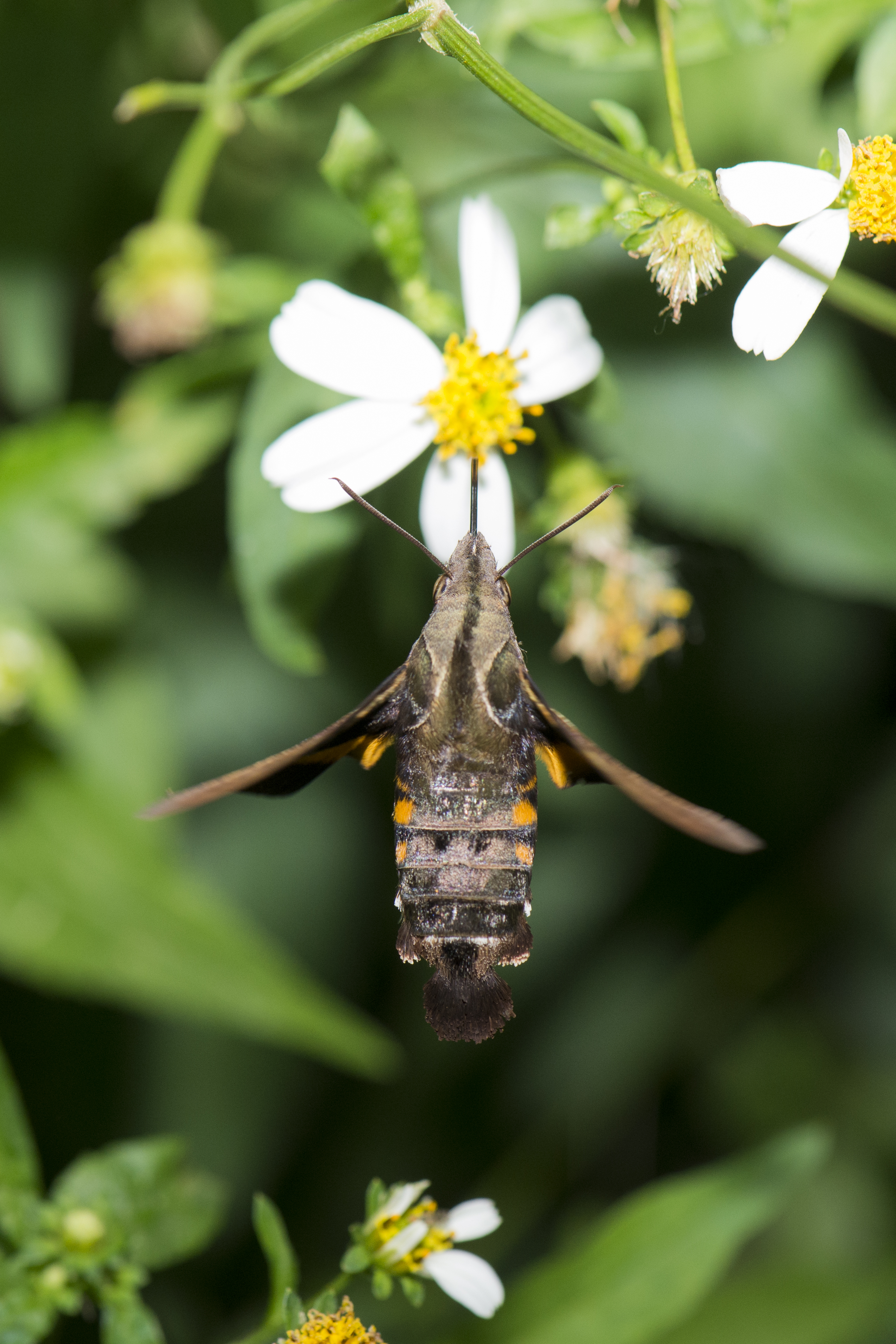

Scientific classification
- Kingdom: Animalia
- Phylum: Arthropoda
- Class: Insecta
- Order: Lepidoptera
- Family: Sphingidae
- Genus: Macroglossum
- Species: M. divergens

Binomial name
- Macroglossum divergens Walker, 1856

Synonyms
- Macroglossa fringilla Boisduval, 1875; Macroglossa kanita Swinhoe, 1892; Macroglossa loochooana Rothschild, 1894; Macroglossum heliophila divergens Walker, 1856

= Macroglossum divergens =

Broad-bordered hummingbird hawkmoth

Species of moth

Macroglossum divergens, the broad-bordered hummingbird hawkmoth, is a moth of the family Sphingidae. It was described by Jean Baptiste Boisduval in 1875. It is found from north-eastern Sikkim, India across southern China to Cheju Island (South Korea), southern Japan, Taiwan and the Philippines and then south through Vietnam, Thailand, Malaysia and Indonesia to New Guinea and neighbouring islands. It may be in Sri Lanka.

== Description ==
The wingspan is 50–60 mm. Head, thorax, and first two abdominal segments are rufus coloured. Third and fourth abdominal segments are with latrea; yellow bands and paired black dorsal spots. There is a black dorsal spot on the terminal segment. Ventral side is reddish. Forewings are greyish brown. Antemedial band is wide and recurved along the inner margin. Two curved postmedial diffused bands which are dark with reddish brown can be seen on their inner sides. Subapical markings are indistinct. Hindwings and ventral side is similar to Macroglossum sitiene.

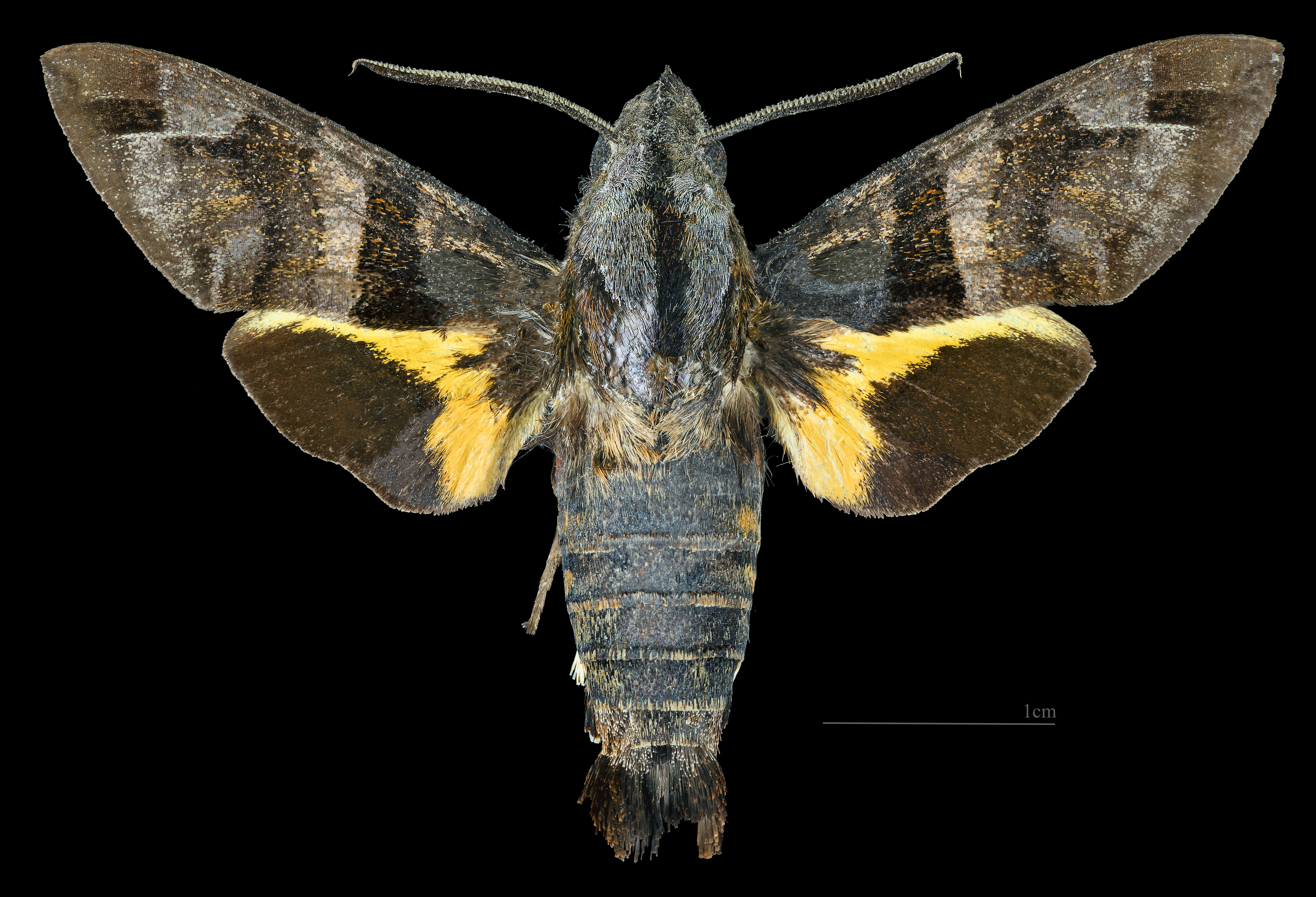
Male dorsal

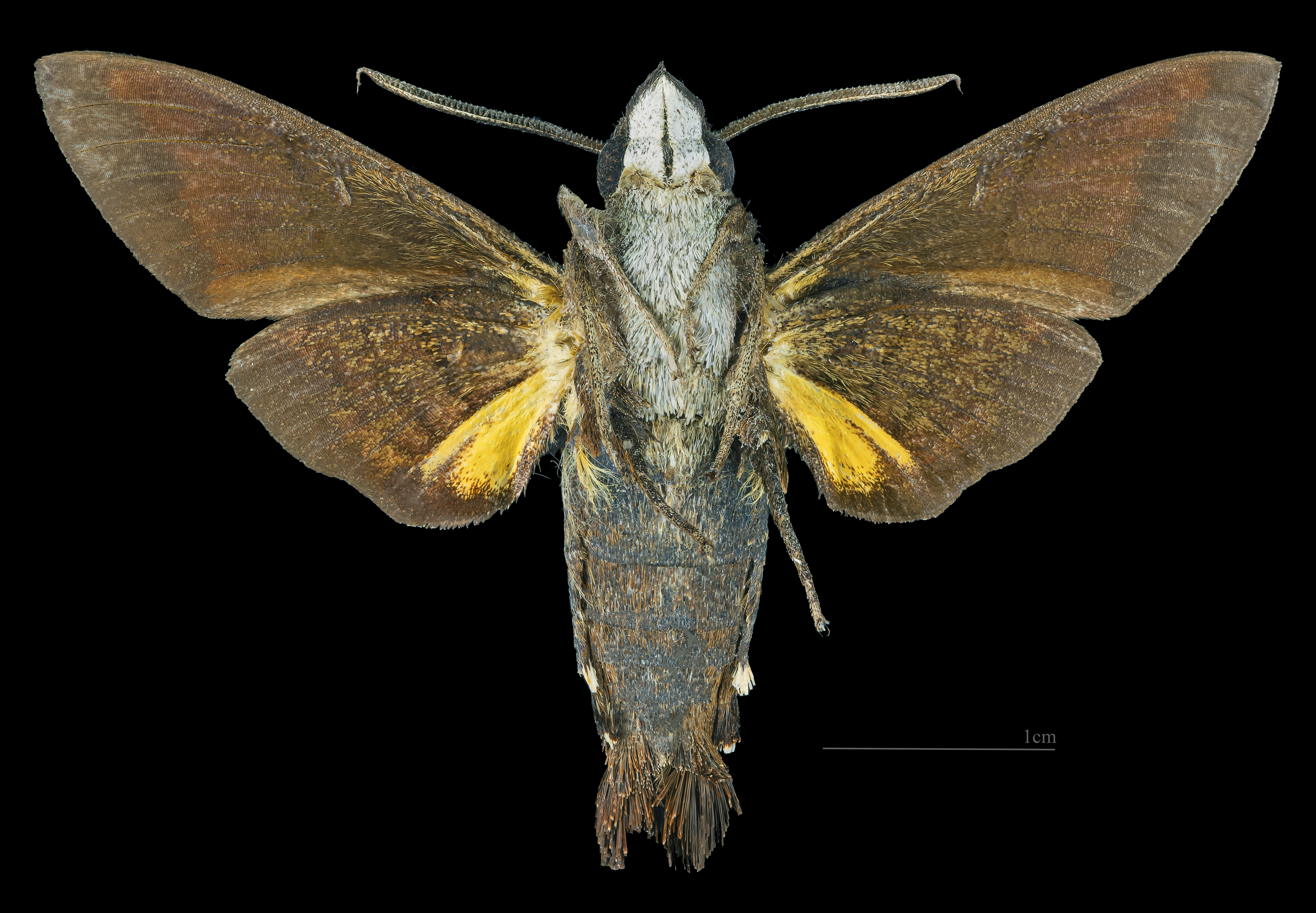
Male ventral

There are two main colour forms in larva. In the green form, the head is yellowish green with the basal segment of the antenna greenish. Other segments are red. Eyes brownish. In the dark-coloured form, the head is pale brown. Body dark smoky olive green or olive brown, dotted with white. A bluish-black dorsal stripe is present. Horn reddish in both forms. Pupa is pinkish bone colour, but head, thorax and wing-case tinged with green.

== Ecology ==
There are several generations per year in Hong Kong, with adults on wing in April and from June to December.

== Subspecies ==
- Macroglossum divergens divergens
- Macroglossum divergens heliophila Walker, 1856 (Sri Lanka)
