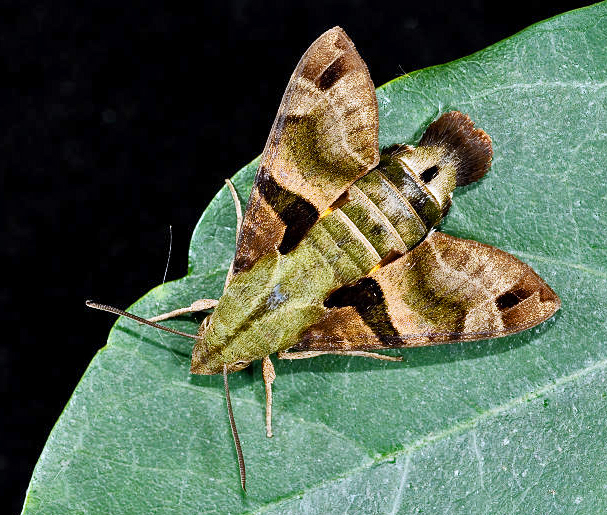

Scientific classification
- Kingdom: Animalia
- Phylum: Arthropoda
- Class: Insecta
- Order: Lepidoptera
- Family: Sphingidae
- Genus: Macroglossum
- Species: M. sitiene

Binomial name
- Macroglossum sitiene Walker, 1856

Synonyms
- Macroglossa sitiens Boisduval, 1875; Macroglossa sinica Boisduval, 1875; Macroglossa orientalis Butler, 1876; Macroglossa nigrifasciata Butler, 1875

= Macroglossum sitiene =

Crisp-banded hummingbird hawkmoth

Species of moth

Macroglossum sitiene, the crisp-banded hummingbird hawkmoth, is a moth of the family Sphingidae described by Francis Walker in 1856.

== Distribution ==
It is known from Sri Lanka, eastern India, Bangladesh, Myanmar, Thailand, southern China, Taiwan, southern Japan (the Ryukyu Archipelago), Vietnam, Peninsular Malaysia and Sumatra, Indonesia.

== Description ==
The wingspan is 46–56 mm. The thorax is olive green. Forewings are without any reddish tinge; the antemedial band is filled in black and recurved along the inner margin. The first two postmedial lines are more angled below the costa. There is a black subapical streak and spot on the terminal segment of the abdomen which is strongly developed. A yellow band can be seen on the hindwings. The ventral side has three transverse lines on each hindwing. The larva is polymorphic, with both green and brown forms. The horn is long and slightly curved upwards. The head and thorax of the pupa are dull greenish grey, and the rest of the body is brownish grey.

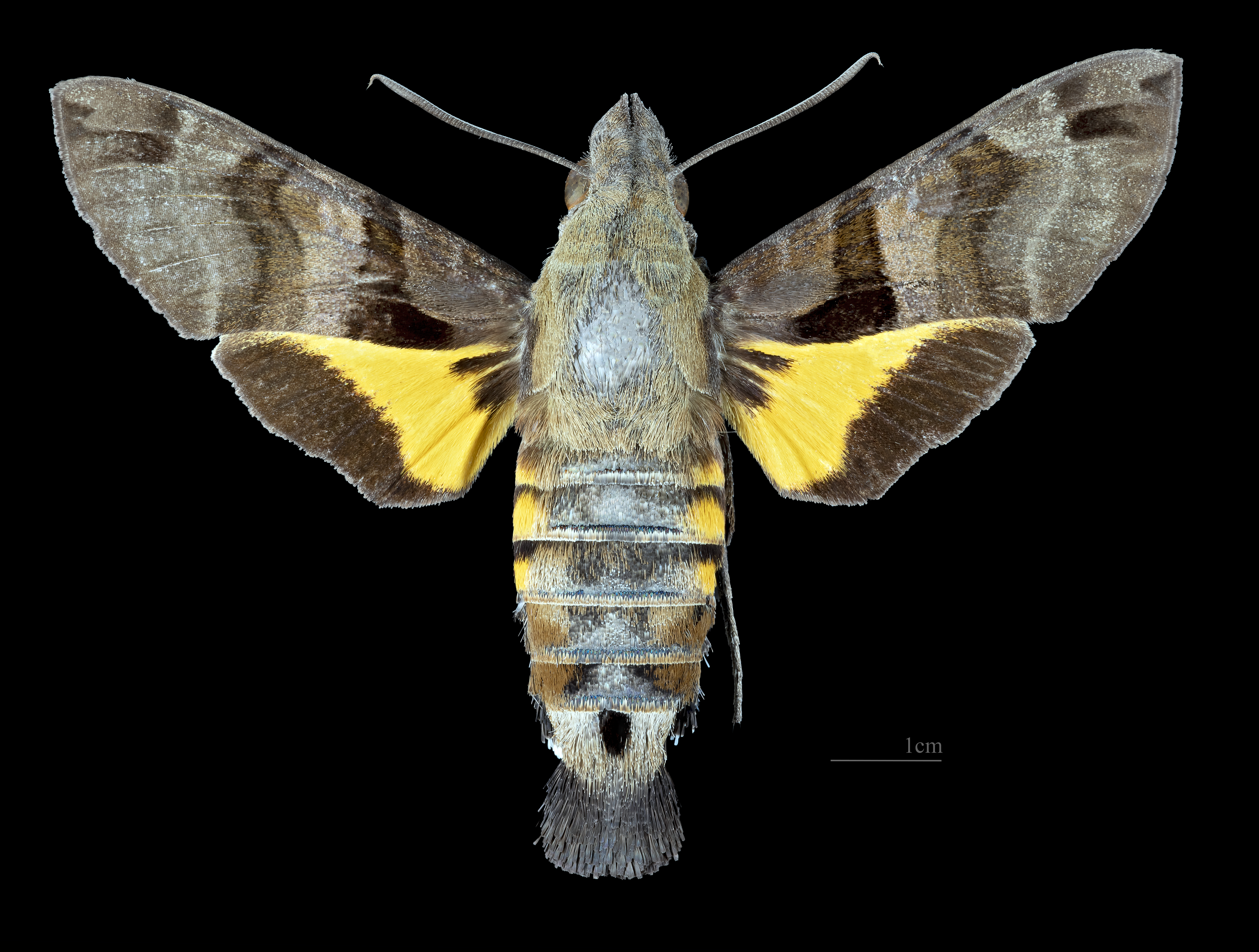
Male dorsal

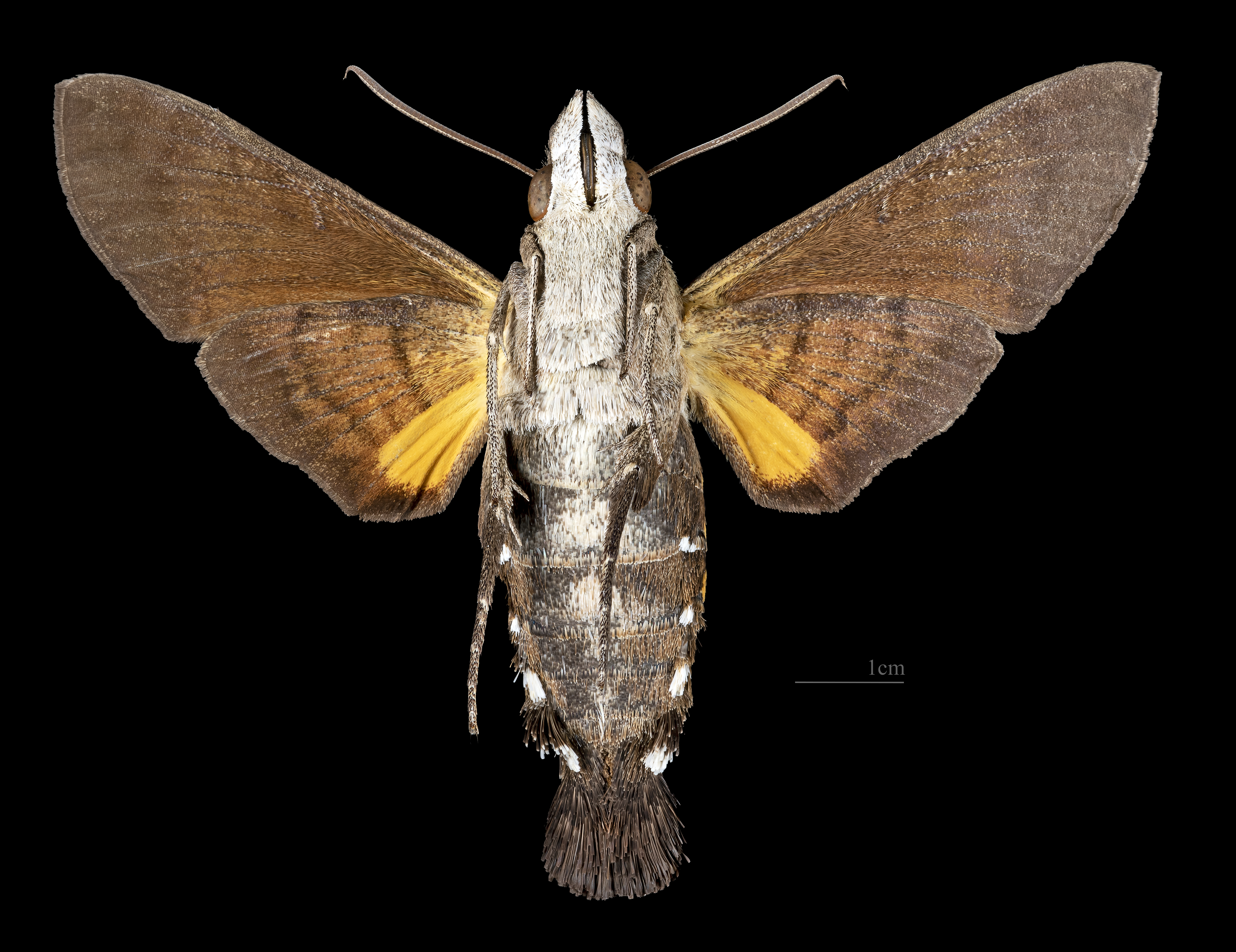
Male ventral

== Ecology ==
Adults are attracted to Duranta erecta and Lantana camara blossoms. They prefer flowers low down on bushes, and fly very close to the ground when approaching.

Larvae have been recorded feeding on Paederia scandens in Hong Kong, Morinda umbellata and Paederia tomentosa farther north in China and mainly Morinda citridora in Thailand.
