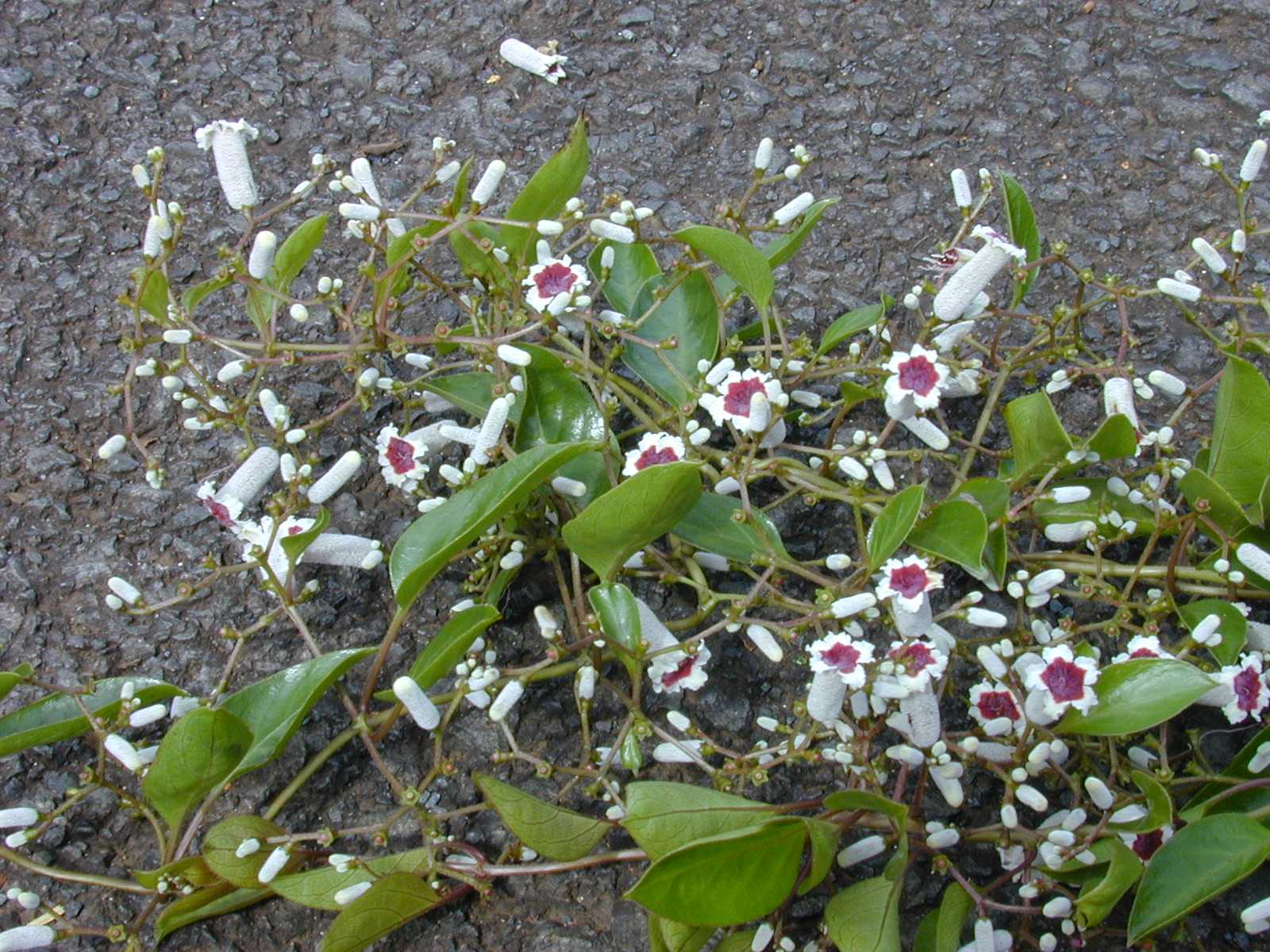

Scientific classification
- Kingdom: Plantae
- Clade: Tracheophytes
- Clade: Angiosperms
- Clade: Eudicots
- Clade: Asterids
- Order: Gentianales
- Family: Rubiaceae
- Genus: Paederia
- Species: P. foetida

Binomial name
- Paederia foetida L.

Synonyms
- P. magnifica Noronha (nom. nud.); P. scandens (Lour.) Merr.; P. tomentosa Blume; Gentiana scandens Lour.

= Paederia foetida =

Skunkvine

Species of plant

Paederia foetida is a species of plant, with common names that are variations of skunkvine, stinkvine, pilau maile (Hawaiian) or Chinese fever vine. It is native to temperate, and tropical Asia; and has become naturalized in the Mascarenes, Melanesia, Polynesia, and the Hawaiian Islands, also found in North America by recent studies.

Paederia foetida is known for the strong, sulphurous odour exuded when its leaves or stems are crushed or bruised. This is because the oil responsible for the smell, and found primarily within the leaves, contains sulphur compounds, including largely dimethyl disulphide.

== Distribution ==
P. foetida is native to Bangladesh and southern Bhutan; Cambodia; Taiwan and China (in Hong Kong and Macau, and the provinces of Anhui, Fujian, Gansu, Guangdong, Guangxi, Hainan, Henan, Hubei, Hunan, Jiangsu, Jiangxi, Shaanxi, Shandong, Shanxi, Sichuan, Xizang, Yunnan, Zhejiang); India (in Andhra Pradesh, Arunachal Pradesh, Assam, Manipur, Meghalaya, Mizoram, Nagaland, Odisha, Sikkim, Telangana, in the northern part of West Bengal, and the Andaman and Nicobar islands); Indonesia; Japan (in Honshu, Kyushu, Shikoku prefectures, as well as in the Ryukyu Islands); Laos; Malaysia; Myanmar; Nepal; the Philippines; Singapore; South Korea; Thailand; and Vietnam.

== Uses ==
It is sometimes planted as an ornamental, and has virtue in folk medicine. It is also used as a culinary spice in some traditional cooking in North Eastern and Eastern India. In Hainanese cuisine, the leaves are ground into flour and mixed with rice to form noodles used in a sweet soup.

== Pests and diseases ==
The caterpillars of four hawkmoth species are recorded to feed on P. foetida: Neogurelca hyas, Macroglossum corythus, M. pyrrhosticta and M. sitiene.
