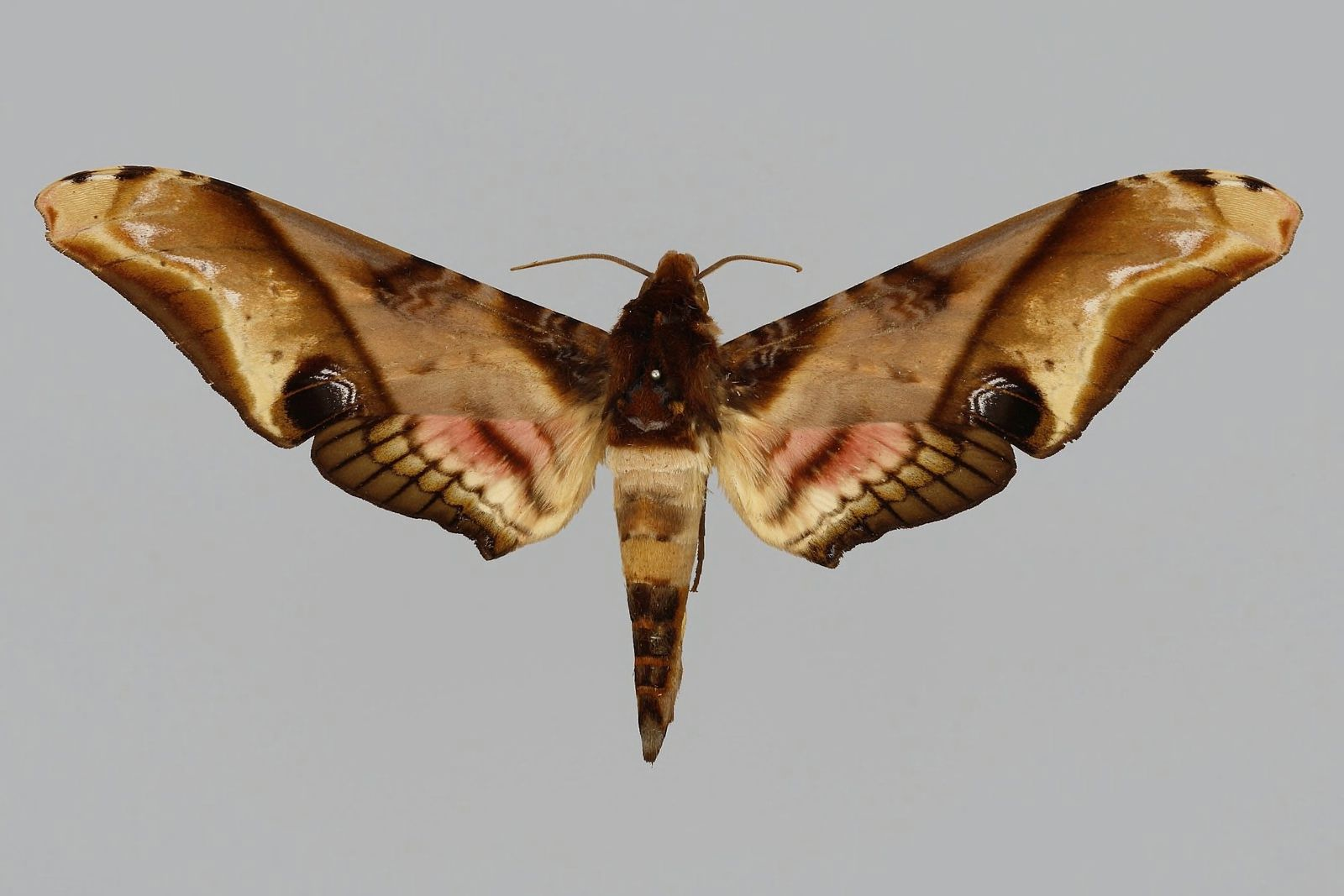

Scientific classification
- Kingdom: Animalia
- Phylum: Arthropoda
- Class: Insecta
- Order: Lepidoptera
- Family: Sphingidae
- Genus: Amplypterus
- Species: A. celebensis

Binomial name
- Amplypterus celebensis (Rothschild & Jordan, 1906)

Synonyms
- Compsogene celebensis Rothschild & Jordan, 1906

= Amplypterus celebensis =

Species of moth

Amplypterus celebensis is a species of moth of the family Sphingidae. It is known from Indonesia (Seram and Sulawesi).

== Subspecies ==
- Amplypterus celebensis celebensis (Sulawesi)
- Amplypterus celebensis seramensis Inoue, 1999 (Seram)
