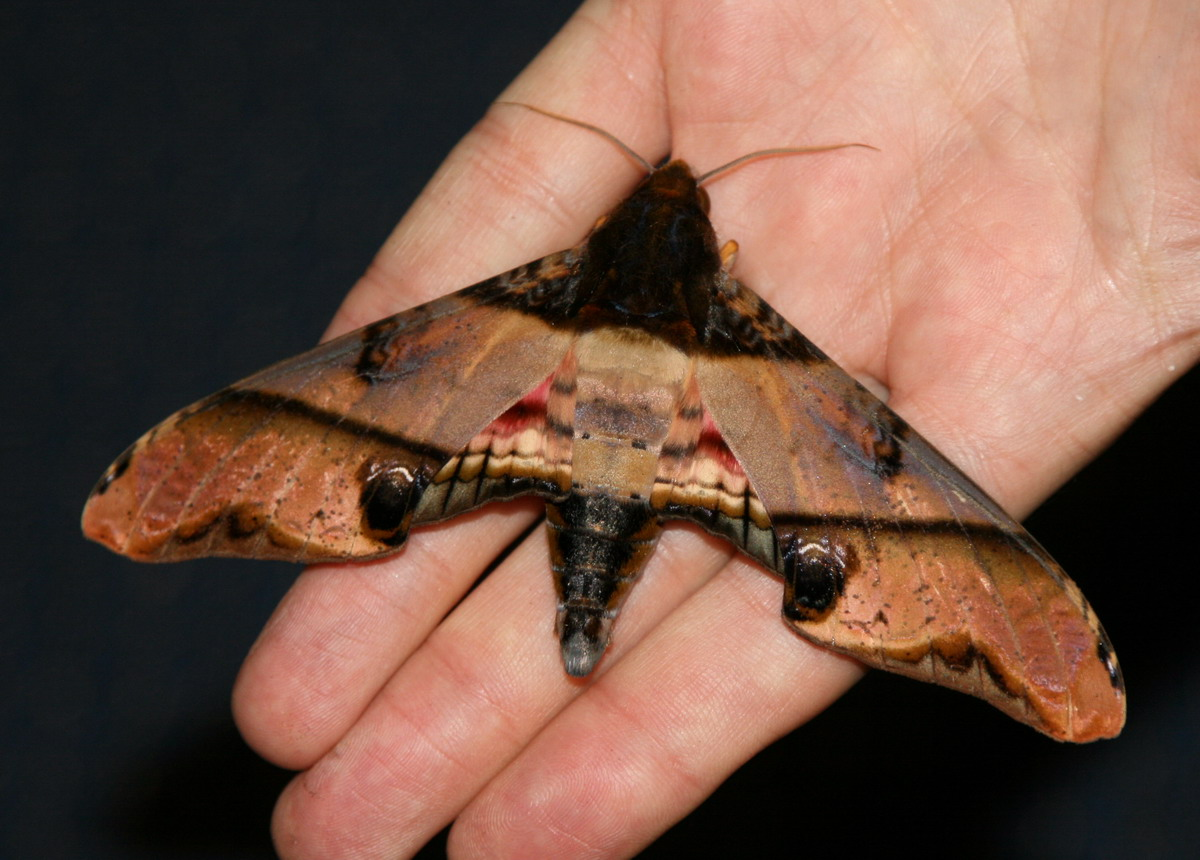

Scientific classification
- Kingdom: Animalia
- Phylum: Arthropoda
- Class: Insecta
- Order: Lepidoptera
- Family: Sphingidae
- Genus: Amplypterus
- Species: A. panopus

Binomial name
- Amplypterus panopus (Cramer, [1779])

Synonyms
- Sphinx panopus Cramer, [1779]; Calymnia panopus (Cramer, [1779]); Composogene panopus (Cramer, [1779]); Calymnia pavonica Moore, 1877

= Amplypterus panopus =

Mango hawkmoth

Species of moth

Amplypterus panopus, the mango hawkmoth, is a moth of the family Sphingidae. The species was first described by Pieter Cramer in 1779. It is found in Sri Lanka, southern and northern India (including the Andaman Islands and Nicobar Islands), Nepal, Myanmar, southern China, Thailand, Vietnam, Laos, Indonesia (to Sulawesi) and the Philippines.

== Description ==
The wingspan is 130–168 mm.

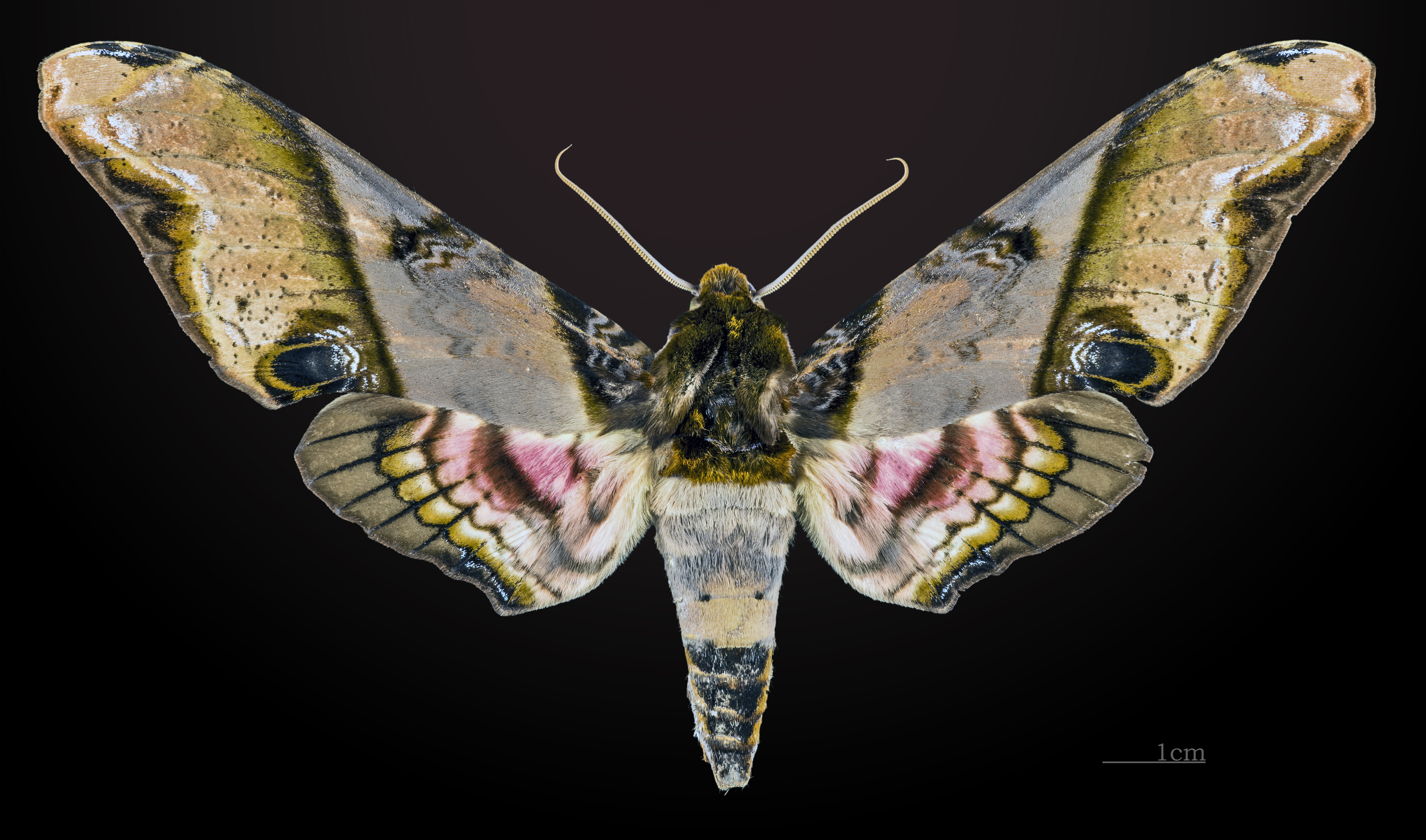
Male dorsal view

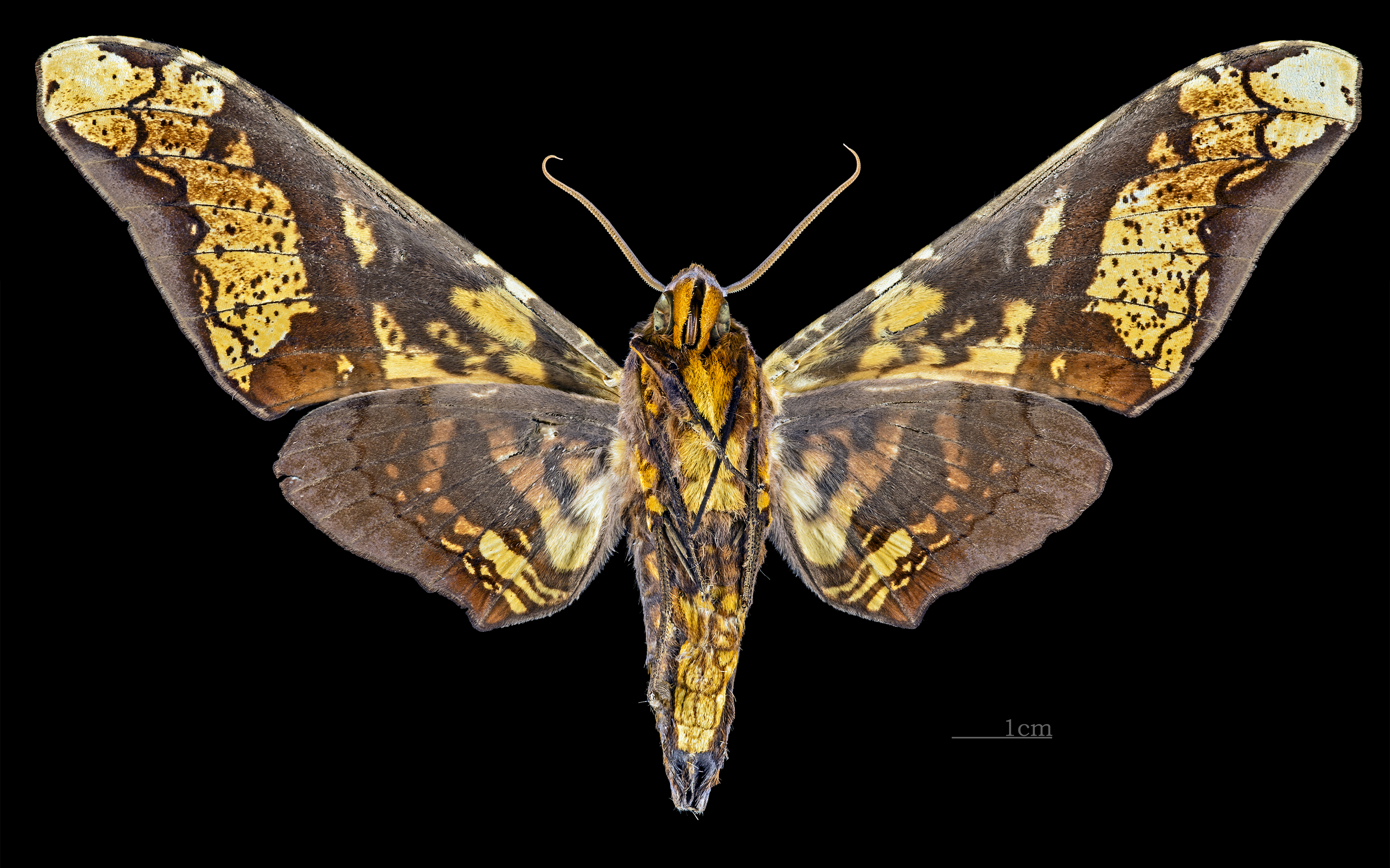
Male ventral view

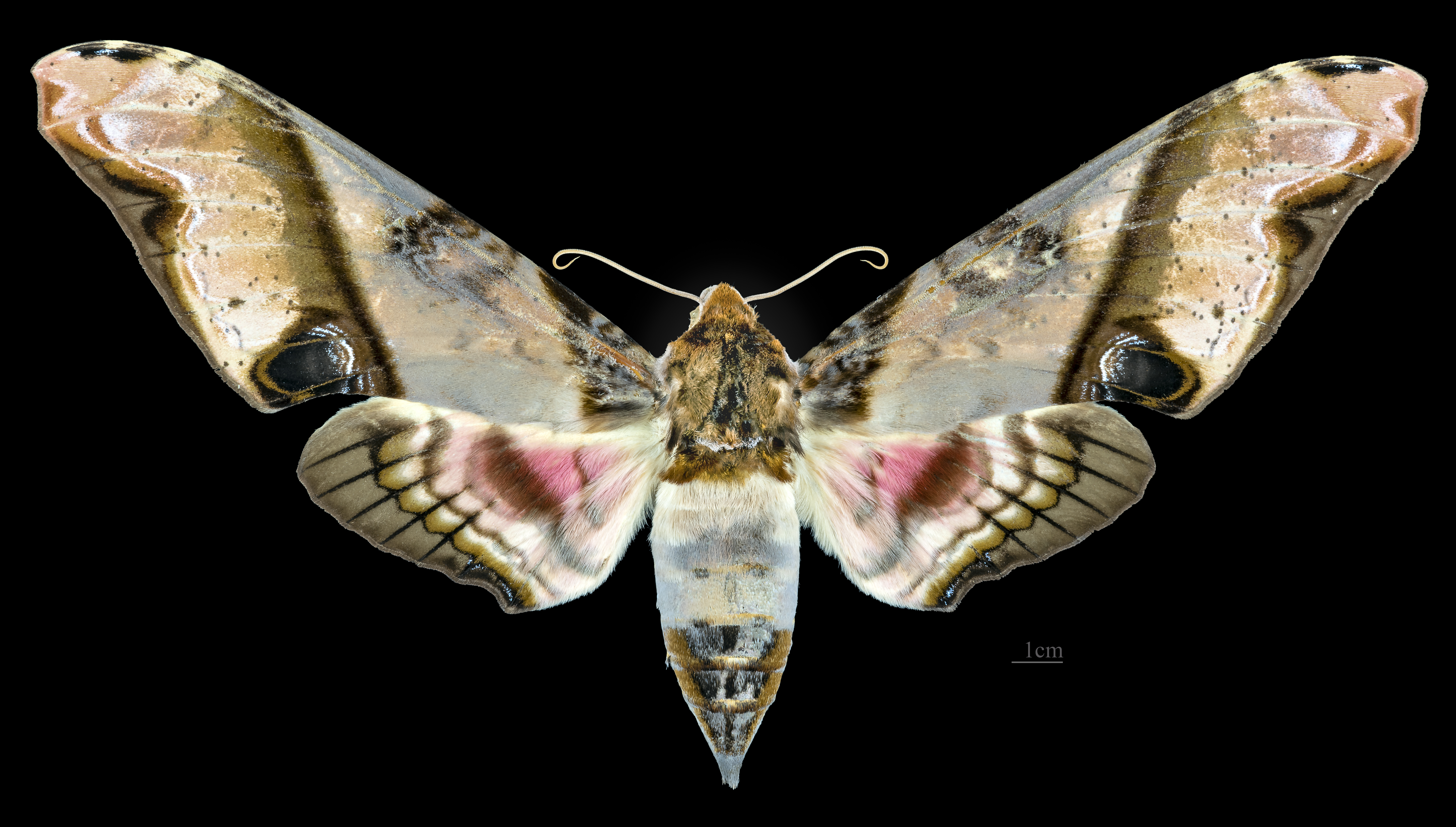
Female dorsal

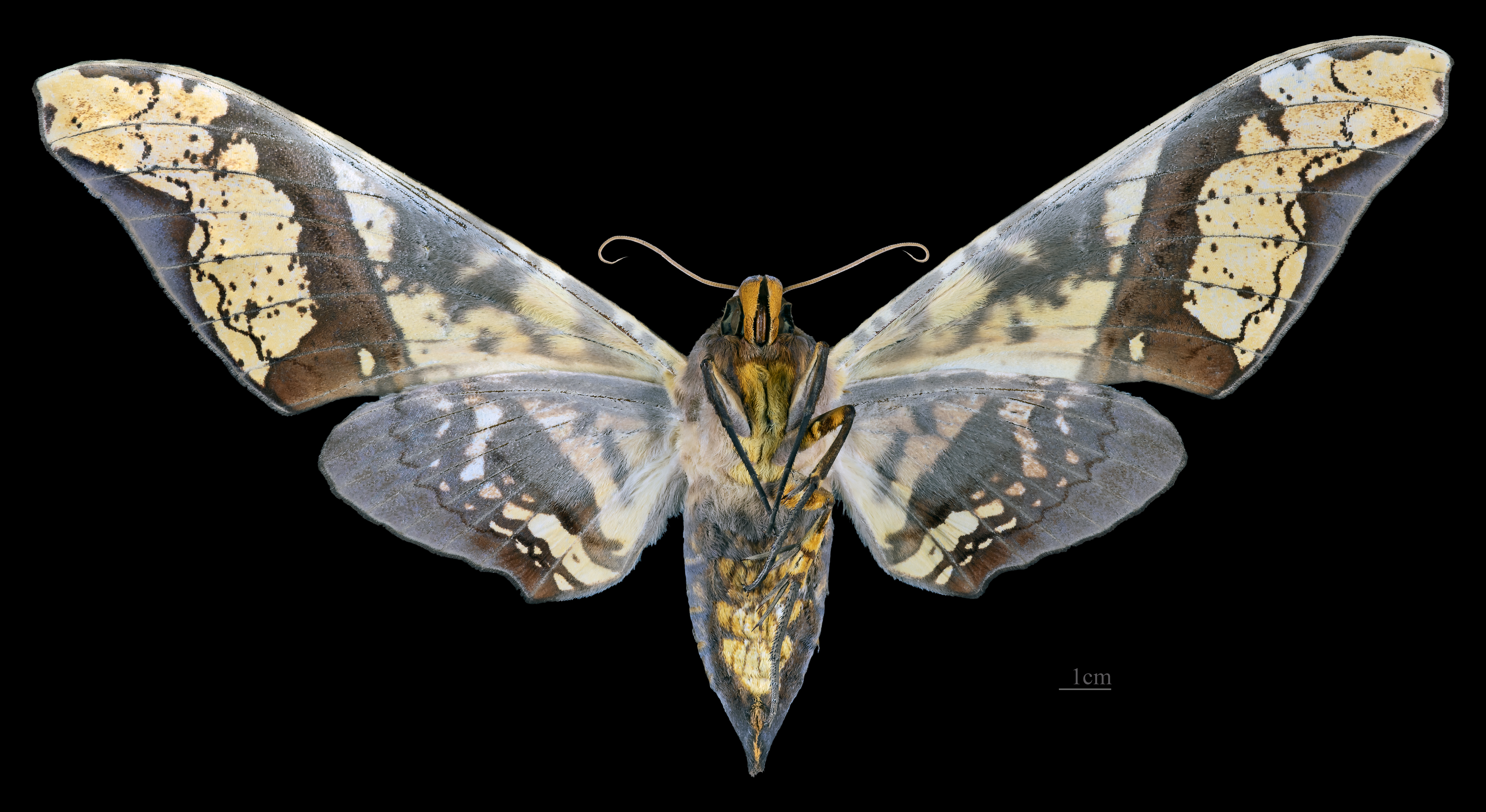
Female ventral

== Biology ==
Adults are on wing in March, April, June, August and December in Hong Kong.

Larvae have been recorded on Dracontomelum dao, Mangifera indica, Rhus, Durio, Calophyllum and Garcinia.

In The Fauna of British India, Including Ceylon and Burma: Moths Volume I, the species is described as follows:

Head, thorax, and terminal segments of abdomen golden brown; the proximal segments pale. Fore wing purplish flesh-color; some brown waved lines near the base; then an oblique band; some waved brown lines from the costa to lower angle of cell; an oblique post-medial band; a highly waved and irregular whitish submarginal line; a dark ocellus near outer angle. Hind wing flesh-color, the outer area brown; the disk suffused with pink; antemedial, medial, and two postmedial lines, the last two angled below the costa. Underside much mottled with yellow. The Andaman and Burmese form pavonina is much darker, especially the basal segments of the abdomen. Larva grey and granulose, with a subdorsal yellow spotted line from the head to the horn; the 4th to 10th somites with oblique yellow lateral stripes; horn tuberculate.

— The Fauna of British India, Including Ceylon and Burma: Moths Volume I

== Subspecies ==
- Amplypterus panopus panopus
- Amplypterus panopus hainanensis Eitschberger, 2006 (Hainan)
