= Amplypterus sumbawanensis =

Scientific classification
- Kingdom: Animalia
- Phylum: Arthropoda
- Class: Insecta
- Order: Lepidoptera
- Family: Sphingidae
- Genus: Amplypterus
- Species: A. sumbawanensis

Binomial name
- Amplypterus sumbawanensis (Eitschberger, 2006)

Synonyms
- Amplypterus panopus sumbawanensis Eitschberger, 2006

Species of moth

Amplypterus sumbawanensis is a species of moth of the family Sphingidae. It is known from Sumba.
