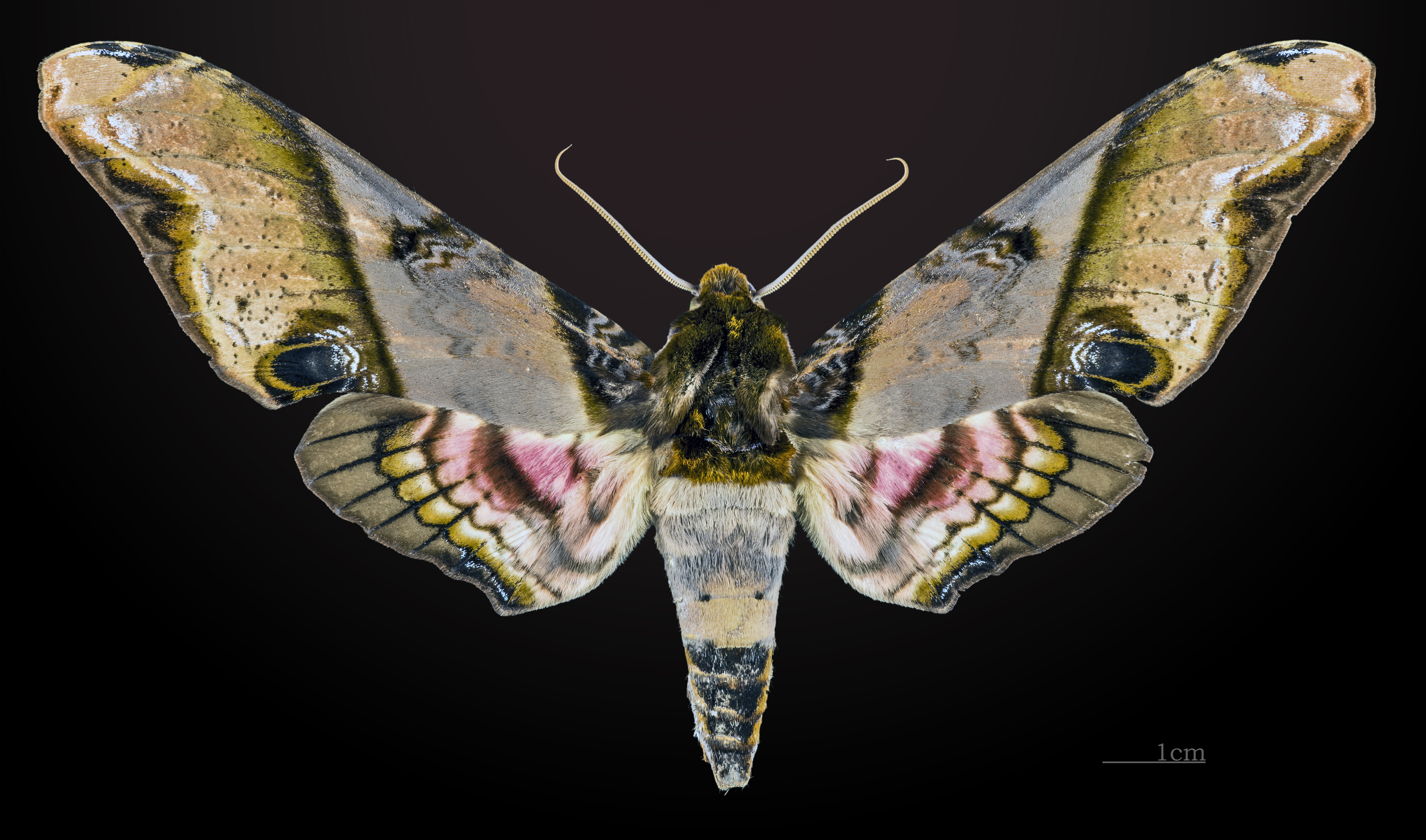
- Amplypterus panopus

Scientific classification
- Domain: Eukaryota
- Kingdom: Animalia
- Phylum: Arthropoda
- Class: Insecta
- Order: Lepidoptera
- Family: Sphingidae
- Tribe: Ambulycini
- Genus: Amplypterus; Hübner, 1819

Synonyms
- Calymnia Walker, 1856; Compsogene Rothschild & Jordan, 1903

= Amplypterus =

Genus of moths

Amplypterus is a genus of moths in the family Sphingidae. The genus was erected by Jacob Hübner in 1819.

== Species ==
- Amplypterus celebensis (Rothschild & Jordan, 1906)
- Amplypterus mansoni (Clark 1924)
- Amplypterus mindanaoensis Inoue, 1996
- Amplypterus panopus (Cramer 1779)
- Amplypterus sumbawanensis (Eitschberger, 2006)
