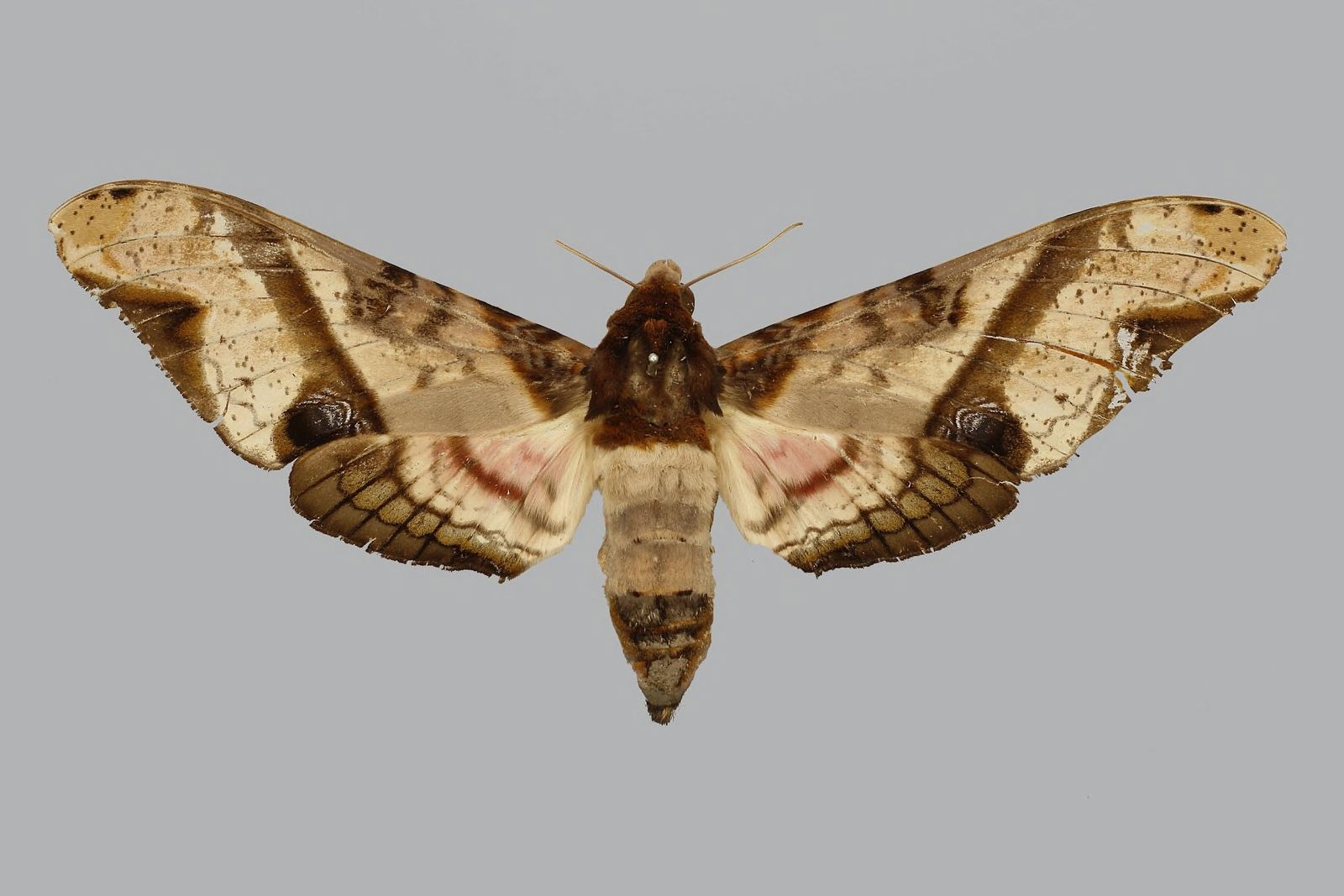

Scientific classification
- Kingdom: Animalia
- Phylum: Arthropoda
- Class: Insecta
- Order: Lepidoptera
- Family: Sphingidae
- Genus: Amplypterus
- Species: A. mindanaoensis

Binomial name
- Amplypterus mindanaoensis Inoue, 1996

= Amplypterus mindanaoensis =

Species of moth

Amplypterus mindanaoensis is a species of moth of the family Sphingidae. It is known from the Philippines.
