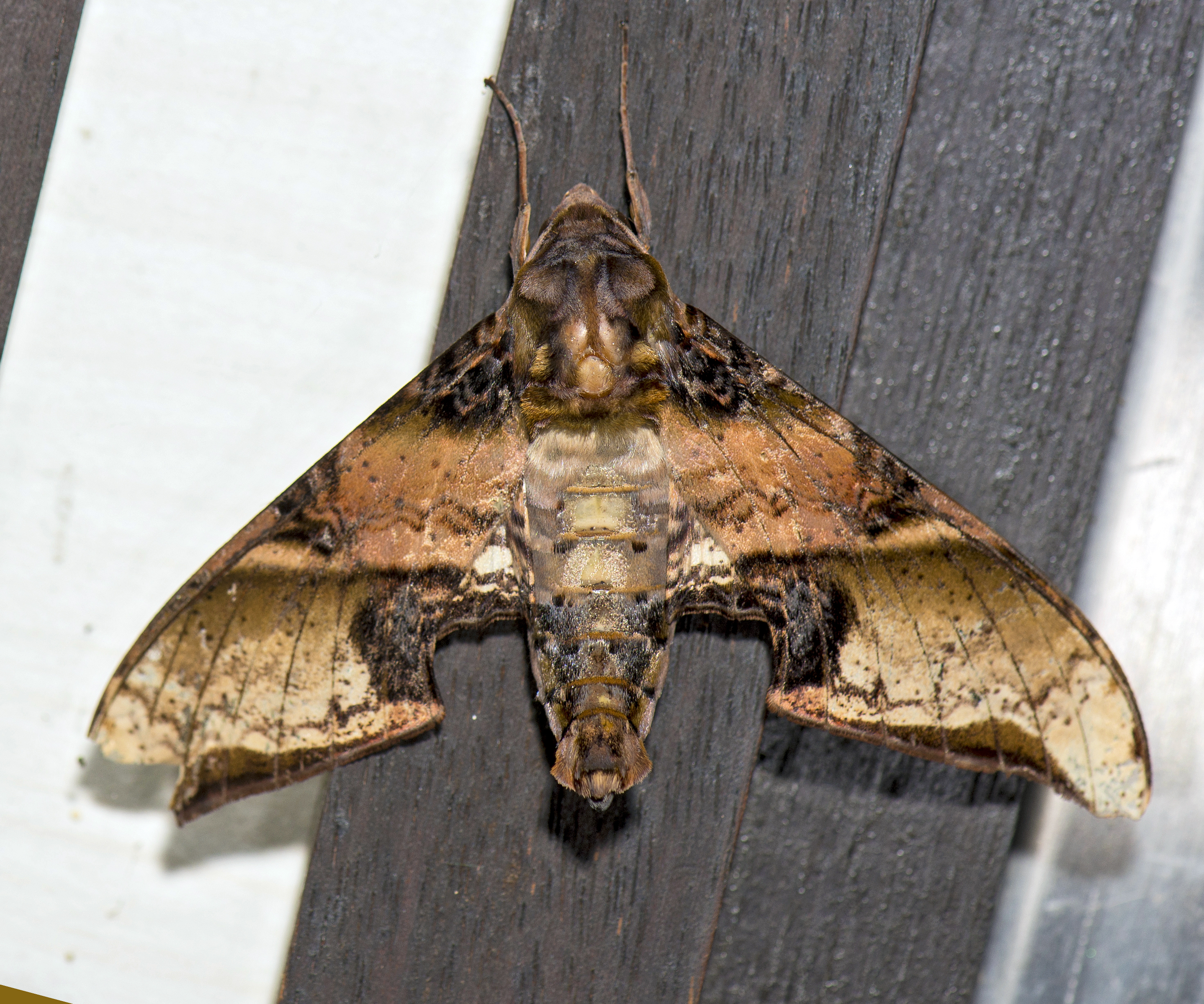
- Amplypterus mansoni, male, upperside

Scientific classification
- Kingdom: Animalia
- Phylum: Arthropoda
- Class: Insecta
- Order: Lepidoptera
- Family: Sphingidae
- Genus: Amplypterus
- Species: A. mansoni

Binomial name
- Amplypterus mansoni (Clark, 1924)

Synonyms
- Compsogene mansoni Clark, 1924; Compsogene mansoni pendleburyi Clark, 1938; Compsogene mansoni formosana Clark, 1936; Oxyambulyx mansoni takamukui Matsumura, 1930

= Amplypterus mansoni =

Species of moth

Amplypterus mansoni is a species of moth of the family Sphingidae first described by Benjamin Preston Clark in 1924.

== Distribution ==
It is known from south-east Asia, including north-eastern India, Burma, Thailand, Laos, Vietnam, Malaysia and Indonesia (Sumatra and Java).

== Description ==
The wingspan is 110–115 mm.

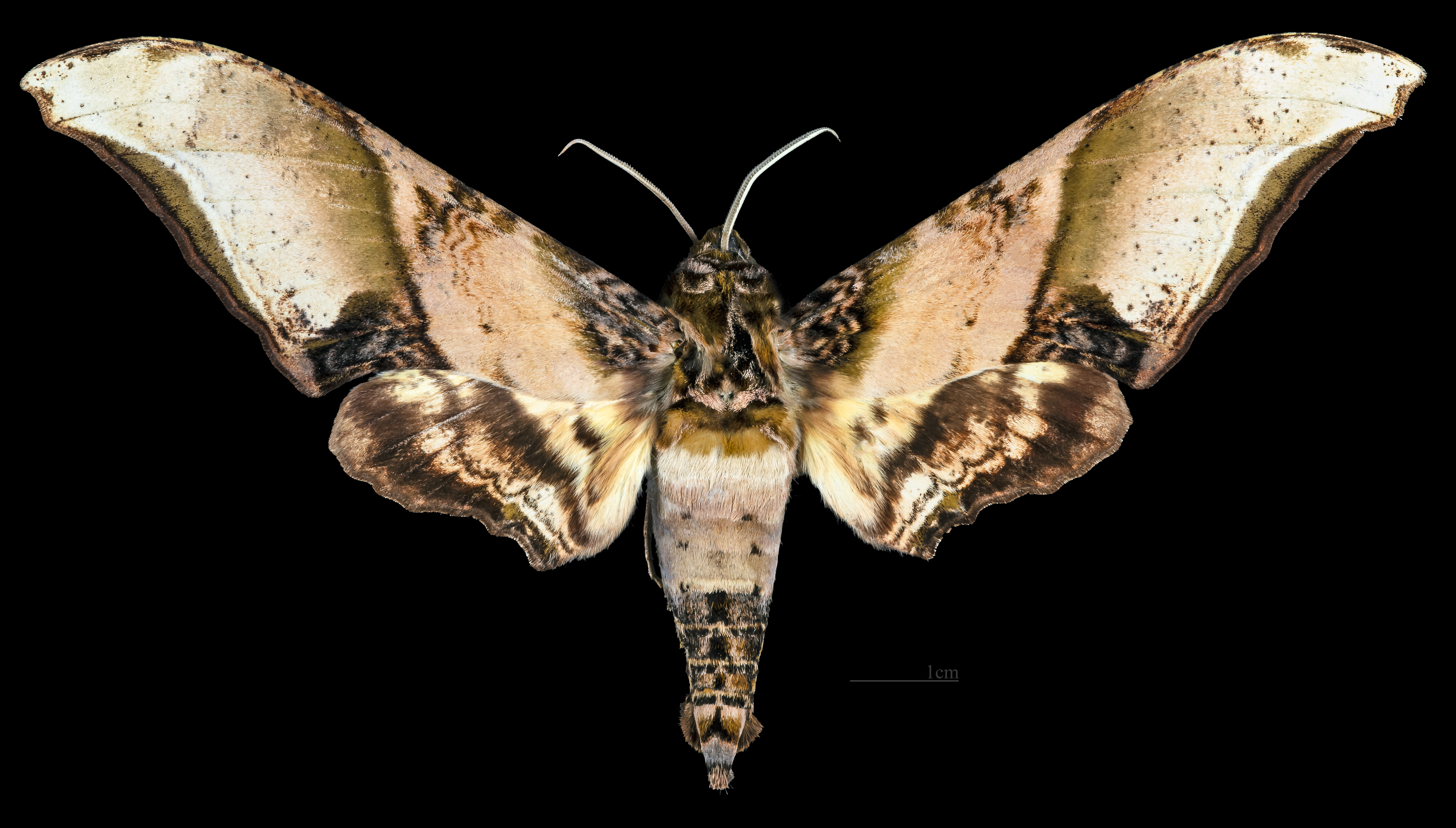
Male dorsal

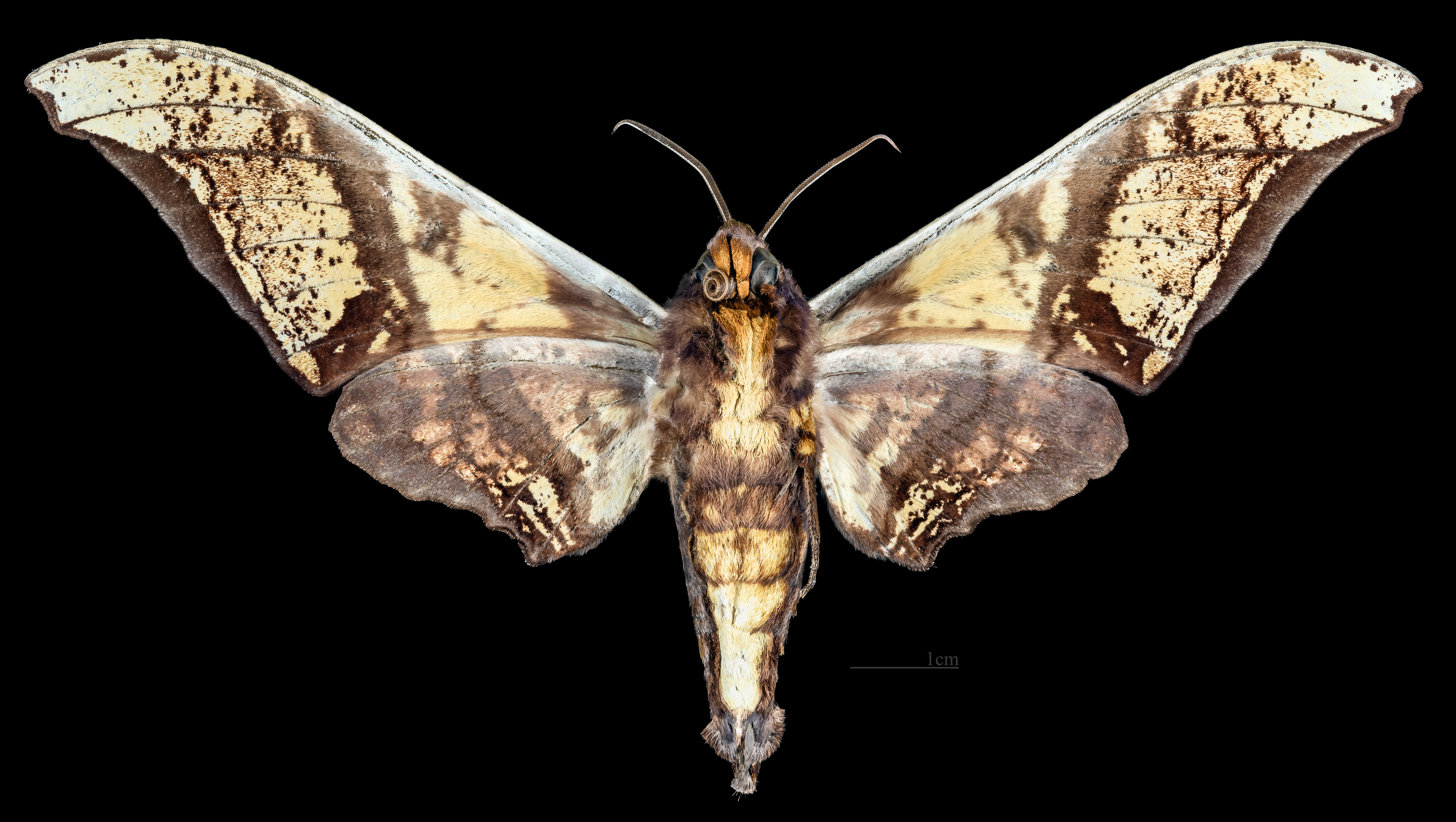
Male ventral

== Subspecies ==
- Amplypterus mansoni mansoni
- Amplypterus mansoni takamukui (Matsumura, 1930) (Taiwan)
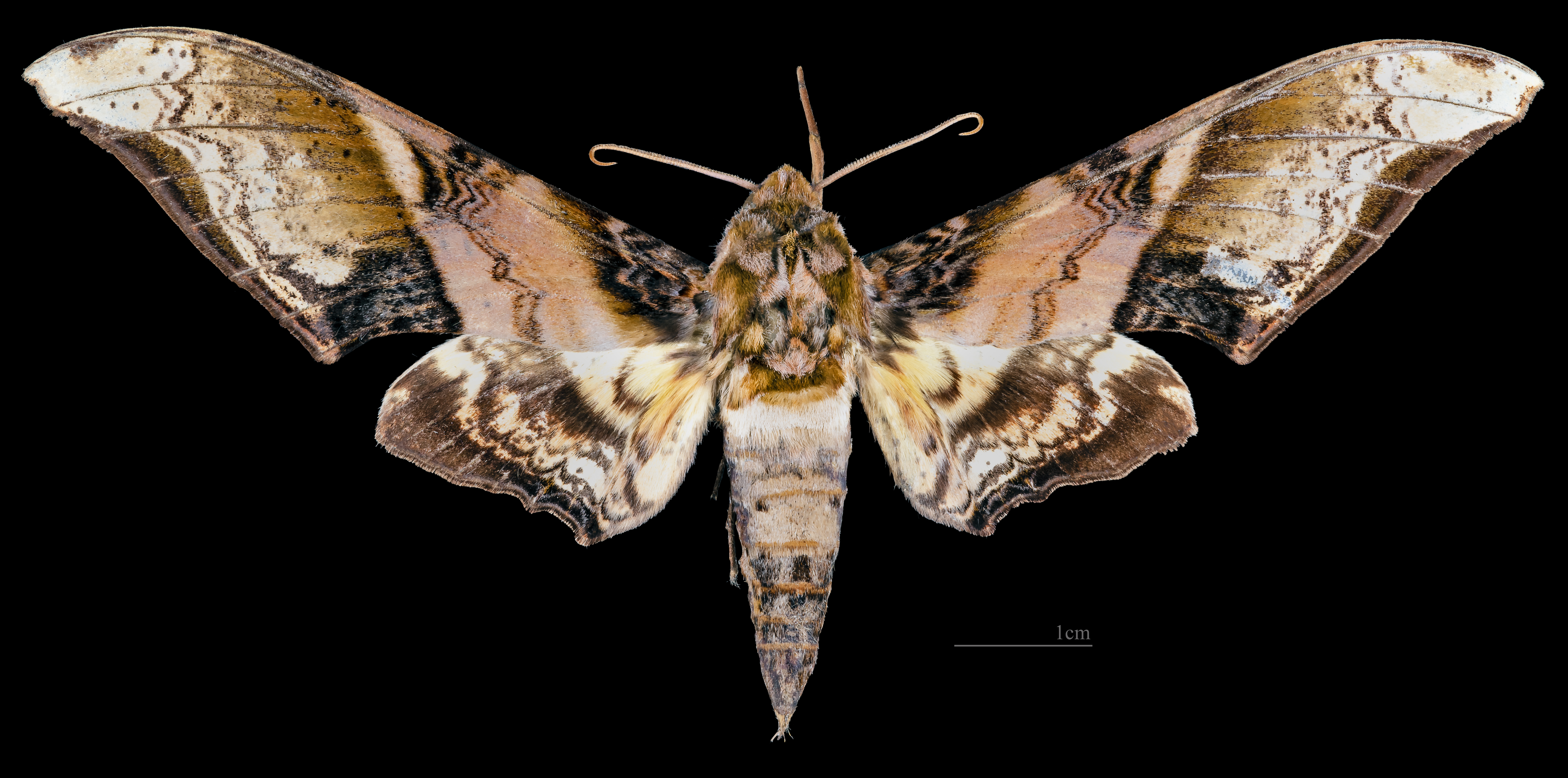
Amplypterus mansoni takamukui ♂

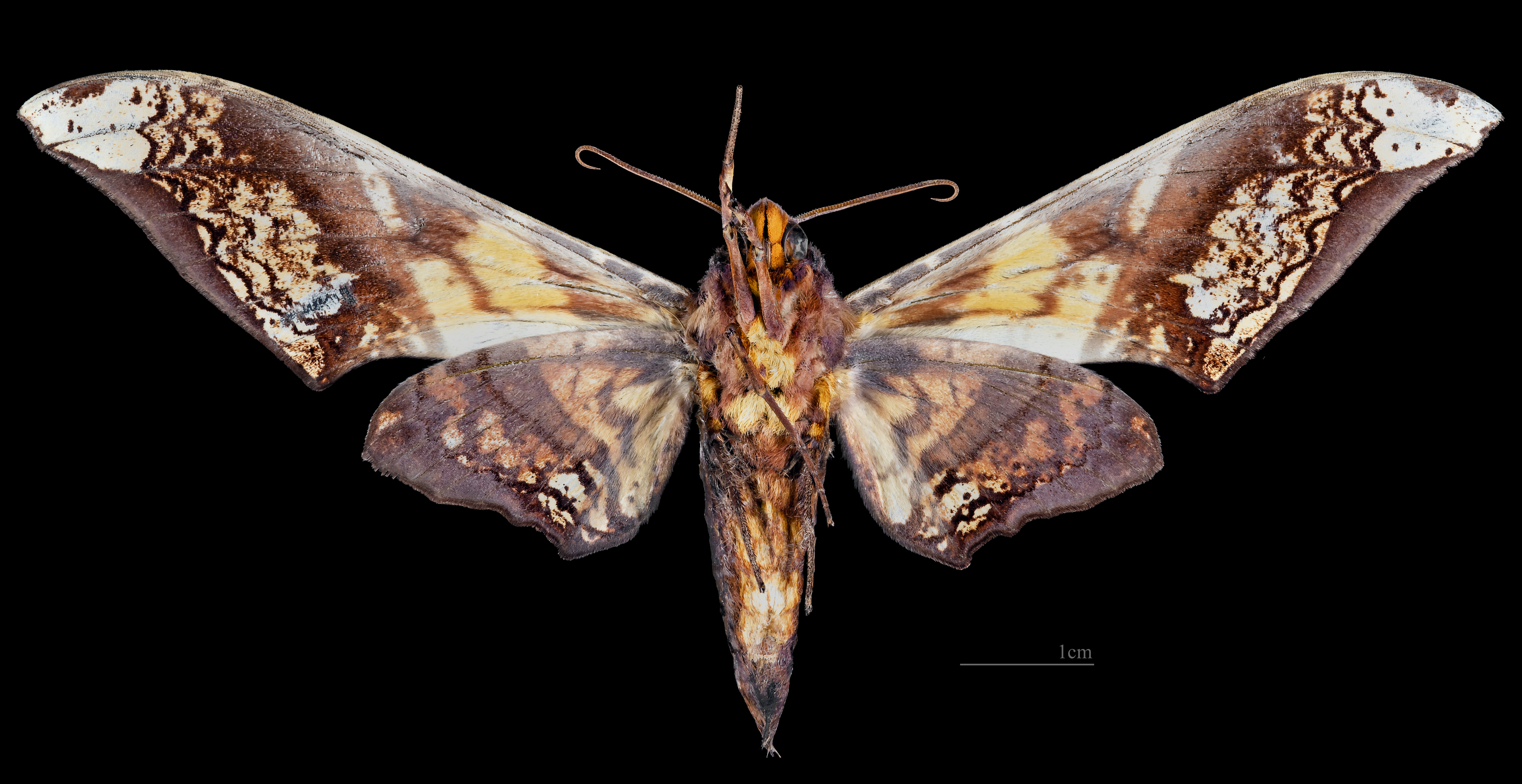
Amplypterus mansoni takamukui ♂ △

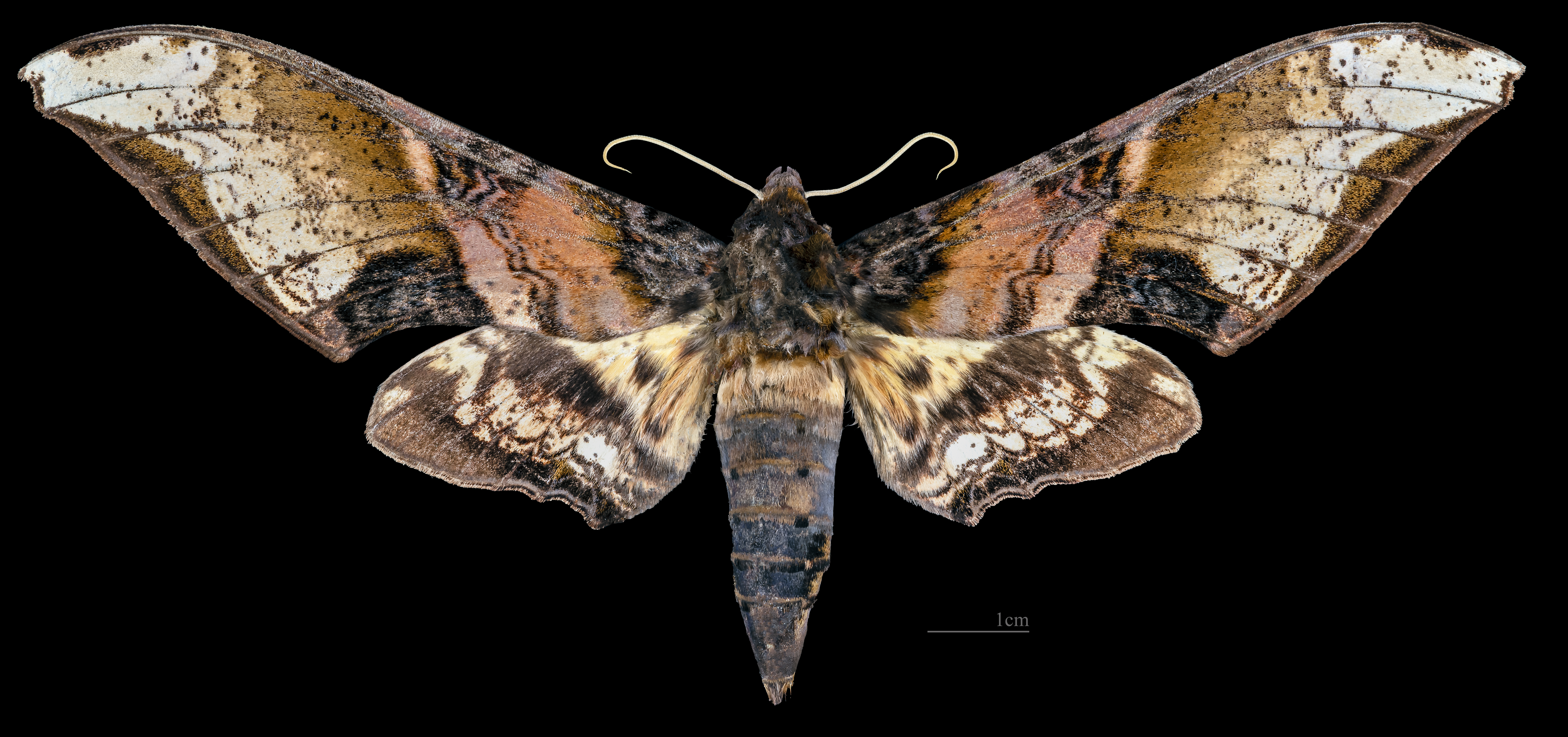
Amplypterus mansoni takamukui ♀

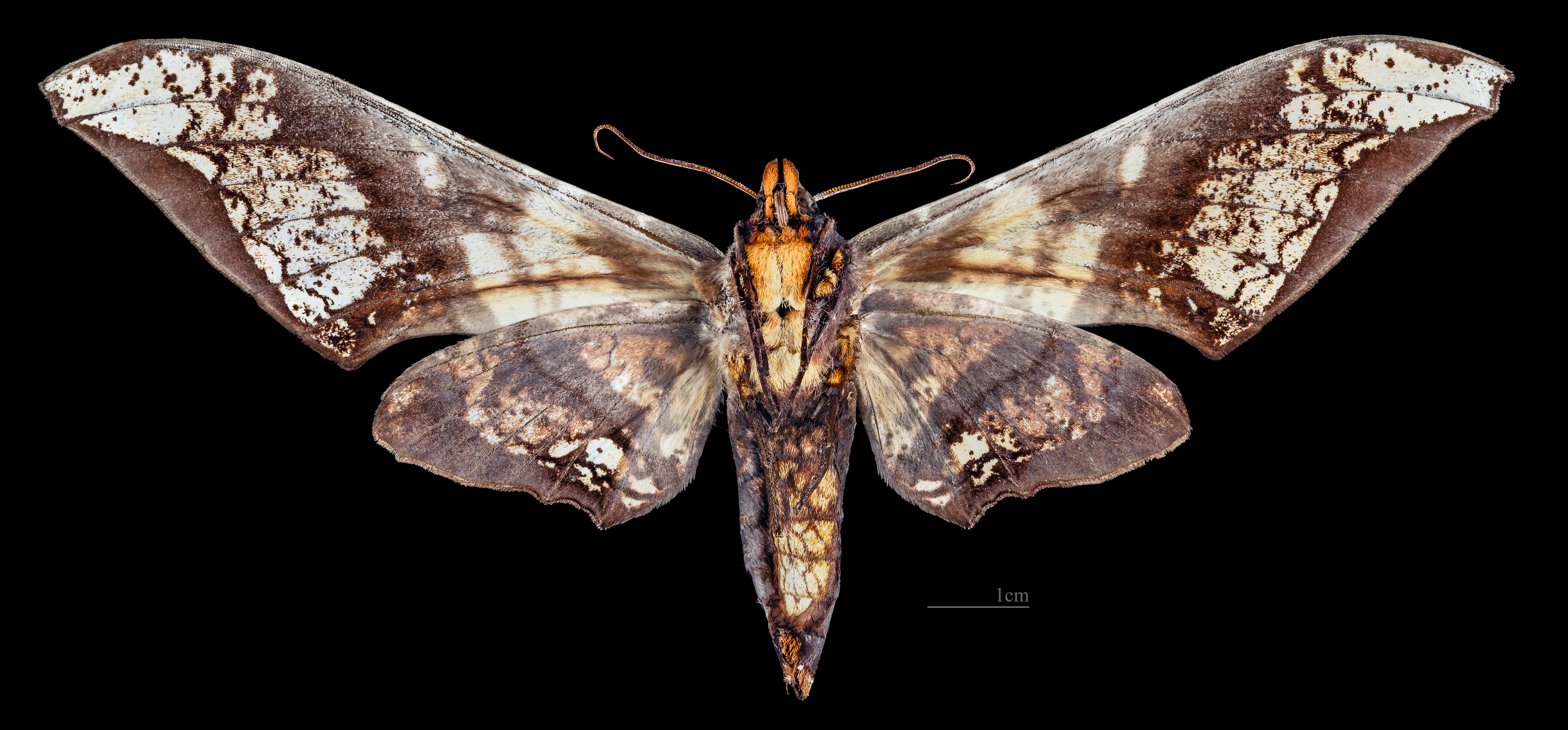
Amplypterus mansoni takamukui ♀ △
