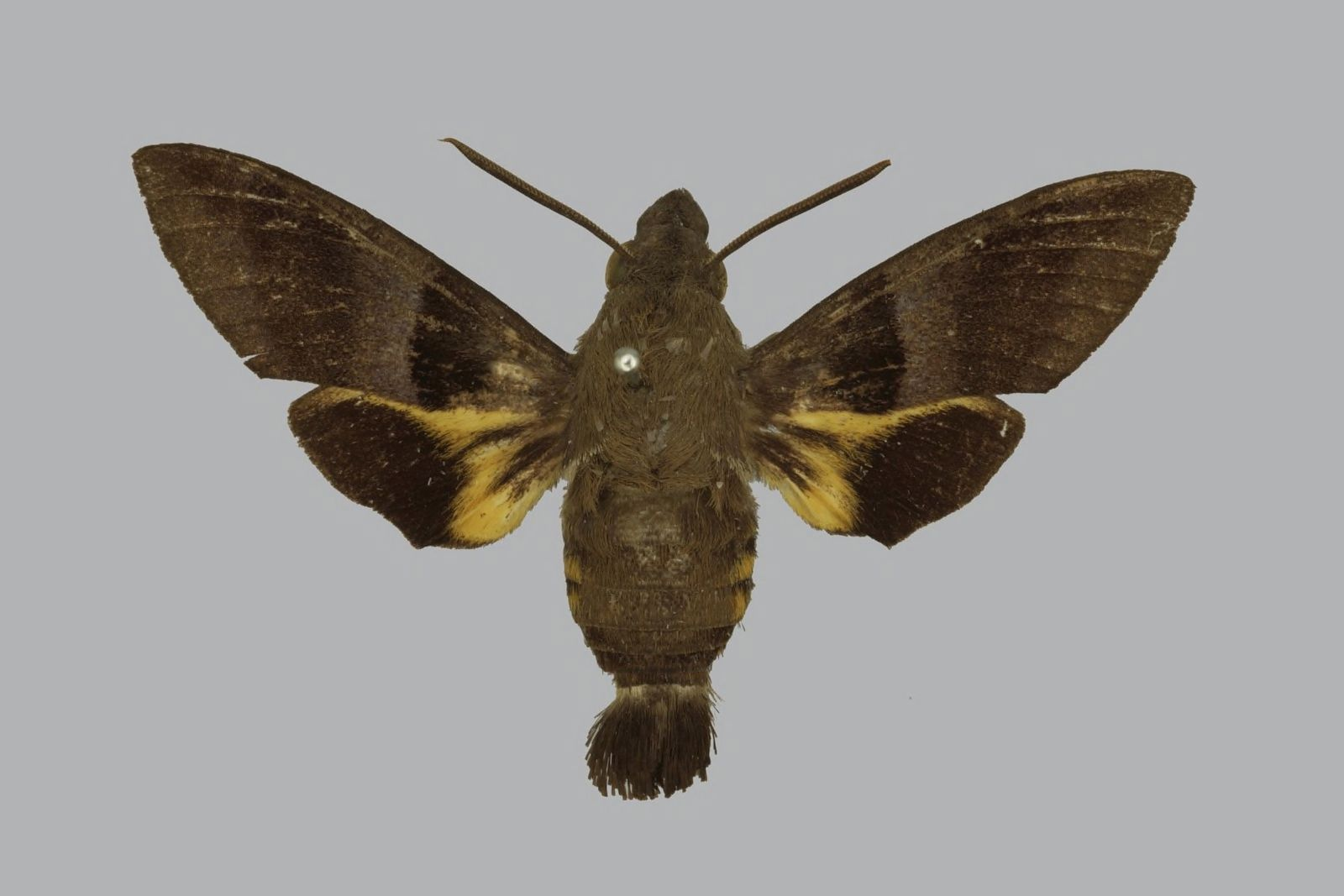

Scientific classification
- Kingdom: Animalia
- Phylum: Arthropoda
- Class: Insecta
- Order: Lepidoptera
- Family: Sphingidae
- Genus: Macroglossum
- Species: M. vidua

Binomial name
- Macroglossum vidua Rothschild & Jordan, 1903

= Macroglossum vidua =

Species of moth

Macroglossum vidua is a moth of the family Sphingidae. It is known from north-eastern Papua New Guinea.

The length of the forewings is about 22 mm. It is similar to Macroglossum glaucoptera, Macroglossum corythus luteata and Macroglossum sylvia, but recognisable by the dirty grey colour of the underside of the palpus, the greyish of the bases of the wing undersides and by the broad antemedian band of the forewing upperside. The head and thorax uppersides have no dark mesial stripe. The underside of the palpus and middle of the thorax are dirty grey, the white scaling mixed with drab-brown scales, the sides darker. The abdomen underside is grey. Both wing undersides are dark walnut-brown, dull, becoming somewhat olive distally, without a distinct brown border. The bases are faintly greyish. The hindwing upperside has an interrupted yellow band.
