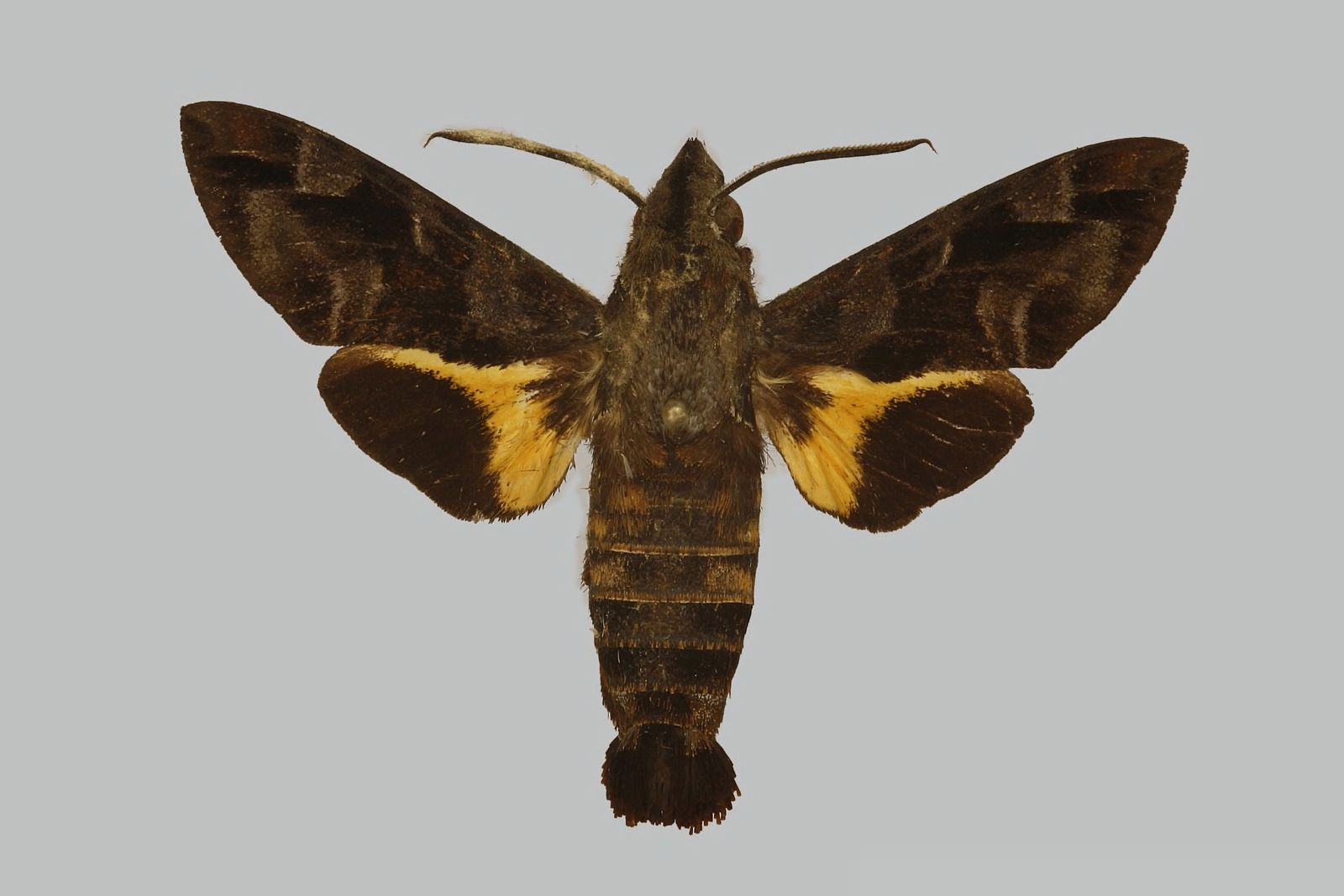
- Macroglossum nemesis, male, upperside. Indonesia, South Sulawesi, Rd Palopo to Rantepao, Puncak Palopo

Scientific classification
- Kingdom: Animalia
- Phylum: Arthropoda
- Clade: Pancrustacea
- Class: Insecta
- Order: Lepidoptera
- Family: Sphingidae
- Genus: Macroglossum
- Species: M. nemesis

Binomial name
- Macroglossum nemesis Cadiou, 1998

= Macroglossum nemesis =

Species of moth

Macroglossum nemesis is a moth of the family Sphingidae. It is known from Sulawesi.

The length of the forewings is 23–24 mm. It is similar to Macroglossum corythus corythus and Macroglossum sylvia, but the forewings are longer and have a more varied pattern.
