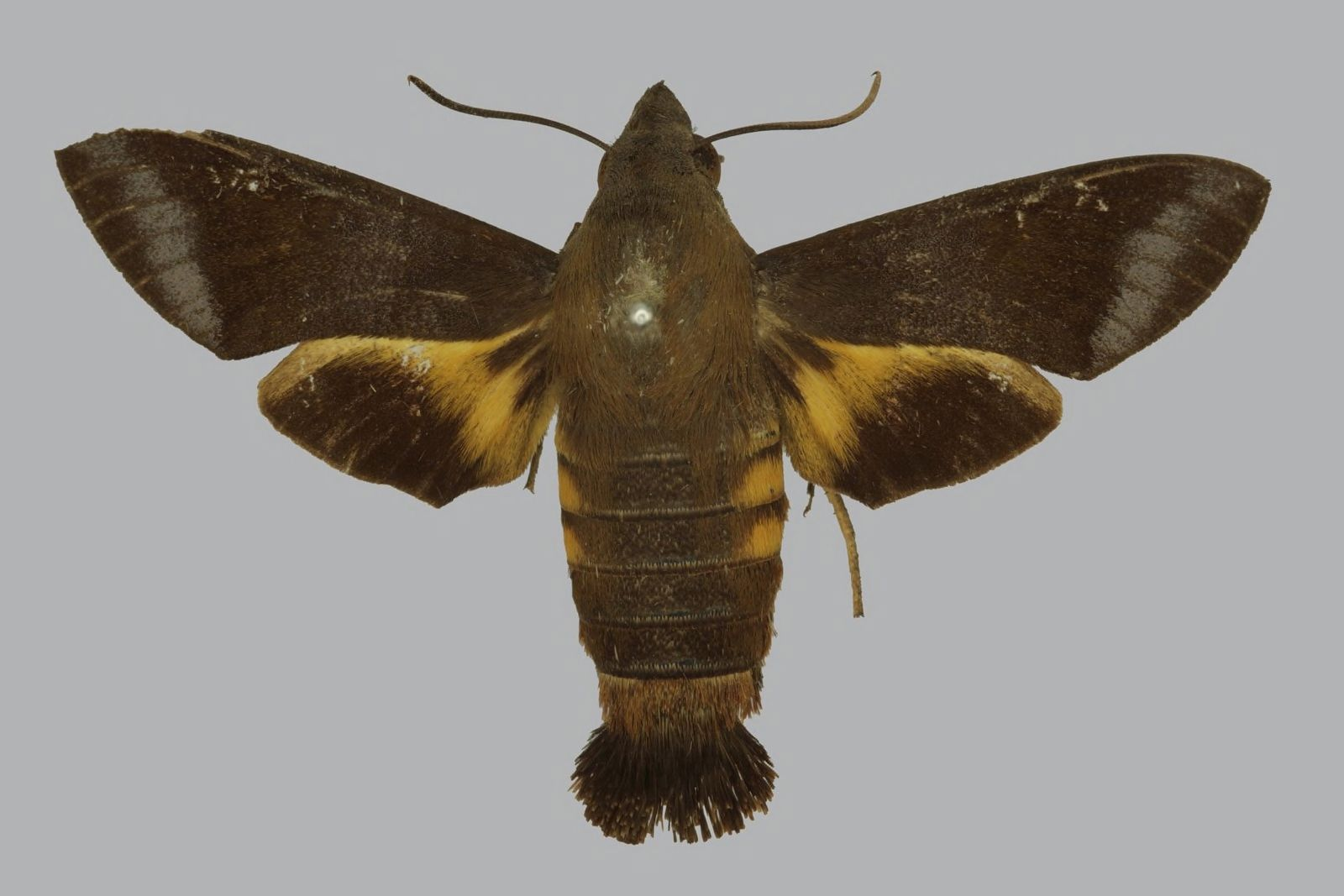

Scientific classification
- Kingdom: Animalia
- Phylum: Arthropoda
- Class: Insecta
- Order: Lepidoptera
- Family: Sphingidae
- Genus: Macroglossum
- Species: M. glaucoptera

Binomial name
- Macroglossum glaucoptera Butler, 1875

Synonyms
- Macroglossum geoffmartini Eitschberger, 2003; Macroglossum loeffleri Eitschberger, 2003; Macroglossum obscuriceps Butler, 1876; Macroglossa lepcha Butler, 1876; Macroglossa fuscata Huwe, 1895

= Macroglossum glaucoptera =

Dark hummingbird hawkmoth

Species of moth

Macroglossum glaucoptera, the dark hummingbird hawkmoth, is a moth of the family Sphingidae. It was described by Arthur Gardiner Butler in 1875. It is known from Sri Lanka, Thailand, southern China, Vietnam, Malaysia (Peninsular), Indonesia (Sumatra, Java) and the Philippines (Mindanao). Single specimen recorded from Papua New Guinea.

== Description ==
The wingspan is 52–54 mm. The upperside of the body is yellowish green with a blackish-brown fantail with no grey band between the lines. The forewing upperside is blackish brown. Hindwings are with a yellow band very narrow. Head is dark greyish, thorax and abdomen are brightly rufus. Abdomen has yellow and black lateral markings on anterior segments. The anal tuft is black with a rufus tip. In the female, the thorax and abdomen are olivaceus. Forewings not quite as dark as in the male. Hindwings have a broad band.

Adults are attracted to the flowers of Duranta erecta. Caterpillars are found on Memecylon scutellatum.
