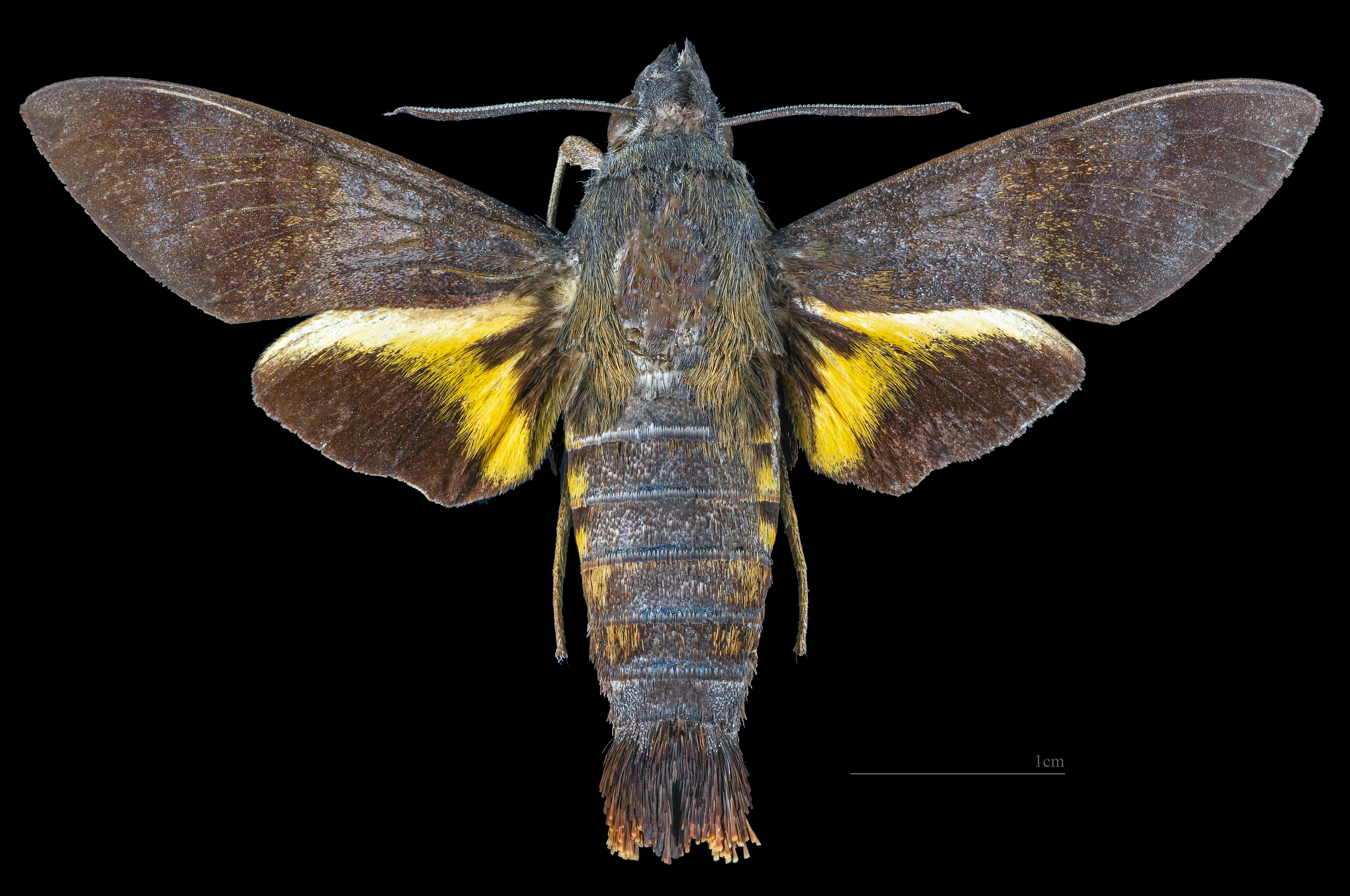
- Male dorsal
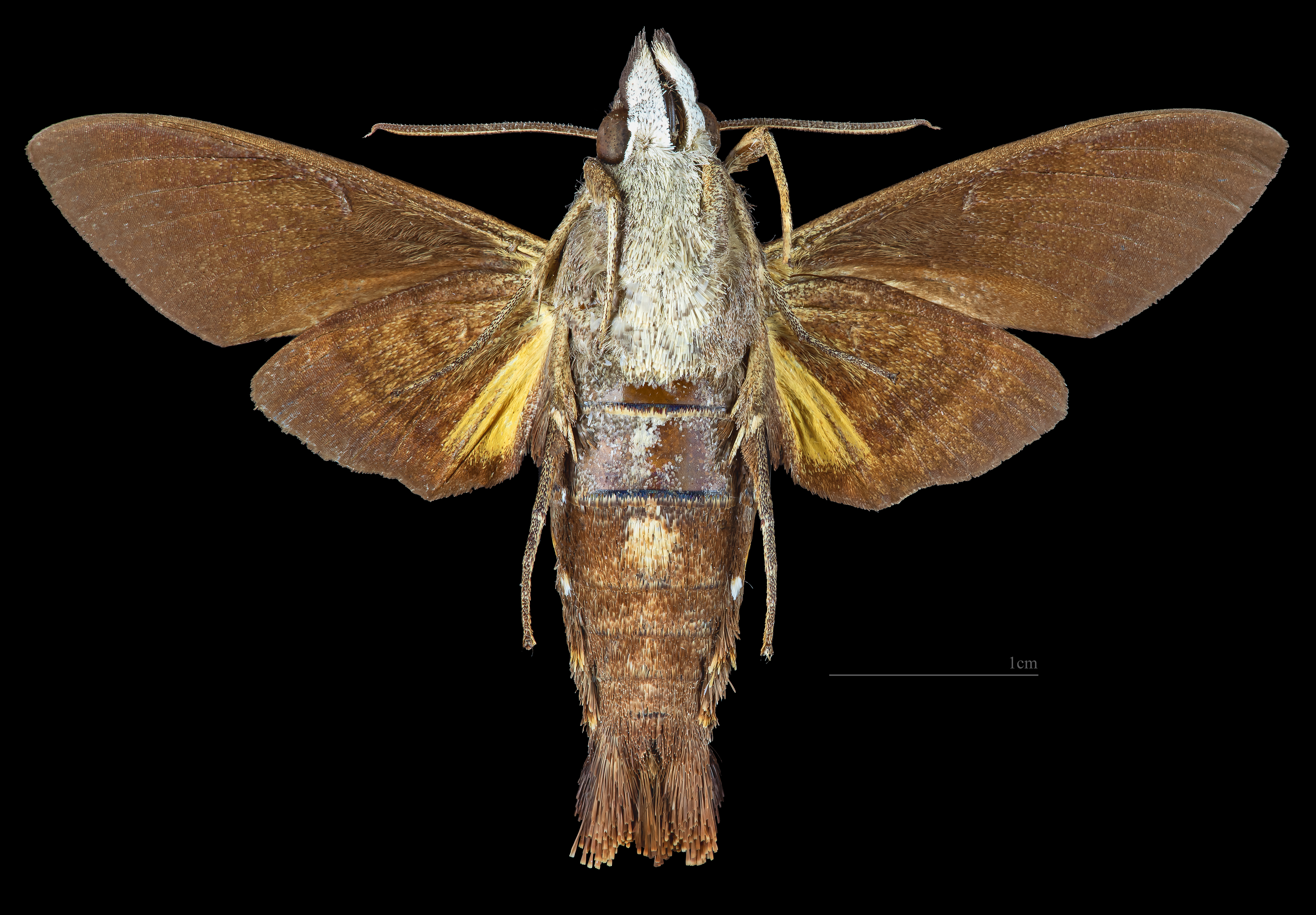
- Male ventral

Scientific classification
- Kingdom: Animalia
- Phylum: Arthropoda
- Class: Insecta
- Order: Lepidoptera
- Family: Sphingidae
- Genus: Macroglossum
- Species: M. sylvia

Binomial name
- Macroglossum sylvia Boisduval, 1875

Synonyms
- Macroglossa obscura Butler, 1875; Macroglossum palauensis Matsumura, 1930

= Macroglossum sylvia =

Species of moth

Macroglossum sylvia, the obscure hummingbird hawkmoth, is a moth of the family Sphingidae. It is known from Sri Lanka, India, Thailand, southern China, Taiwan, Vietnam, Malaysia (Peninsular, Sarawak, Sabah), Indonesia (Sumatra, Java, Kalimantan, Sulawesi, Maluku) and the Philippines.

The wingspan is 60–66 mm.
