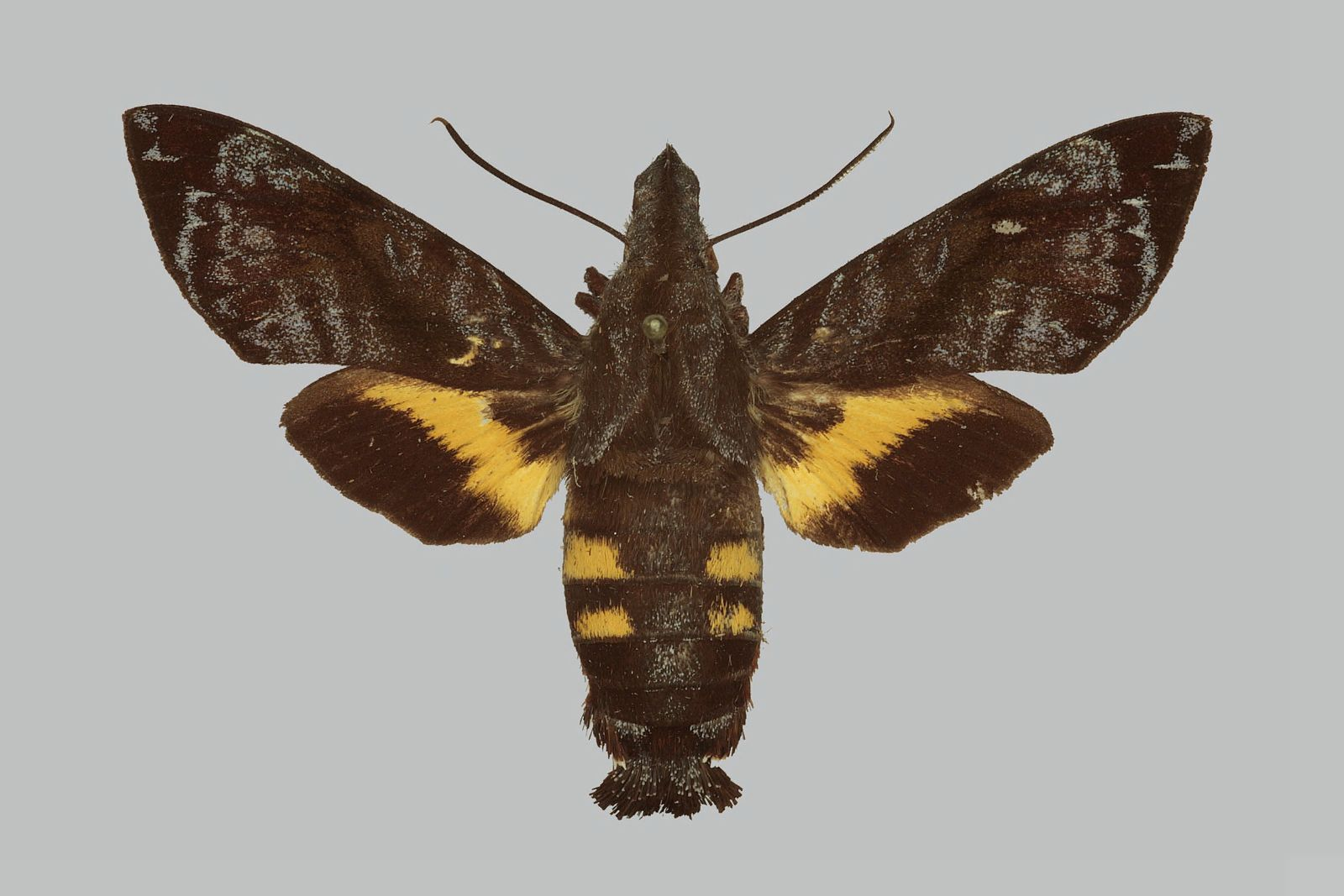
- Female

Scientific classification
- Kingdom: Animalia
- Phylum: Arthropoda
- Clade: Pancrustacea
- Class: Insecta
- Order: Lepidoptera
- Family: Sphingidae
- Genus: Macroglossum
- Species: M. cadioui

Binomial name
- Macroglossum cadioui Schnitzler & Speidel, 2004

= Macroglossum cadioui =

Species of moth

Macroglossum cadioui is a moth of the family Sphingidae. It is known from Sulawesi.

The length of the forewings is 22–24 mm for males and 23–25 mm for females. It is very similar to Macroglossum caldum caldum, in that both species share bluish-white bands and lines on the forewing upperside.
