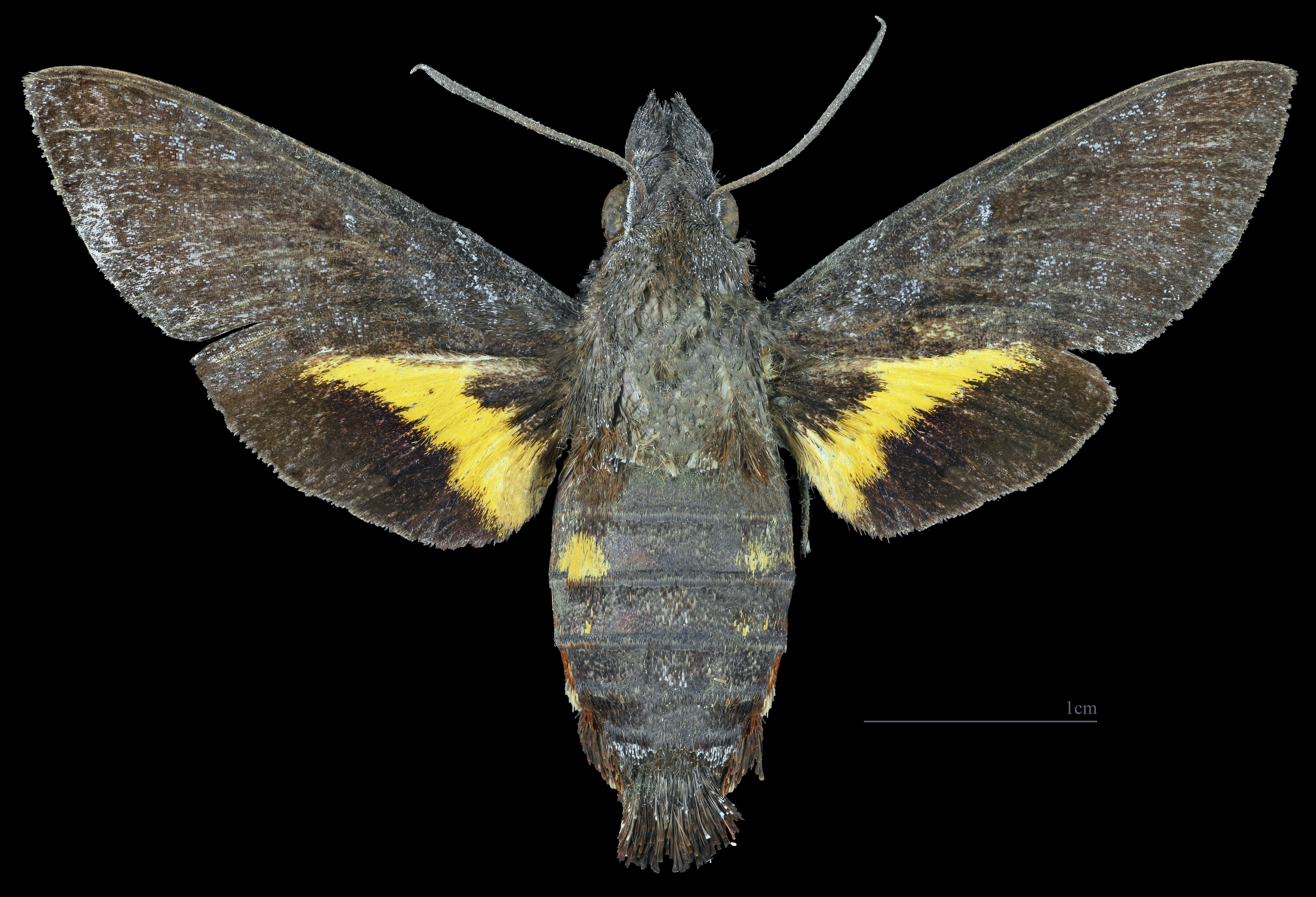
- Male dorsal
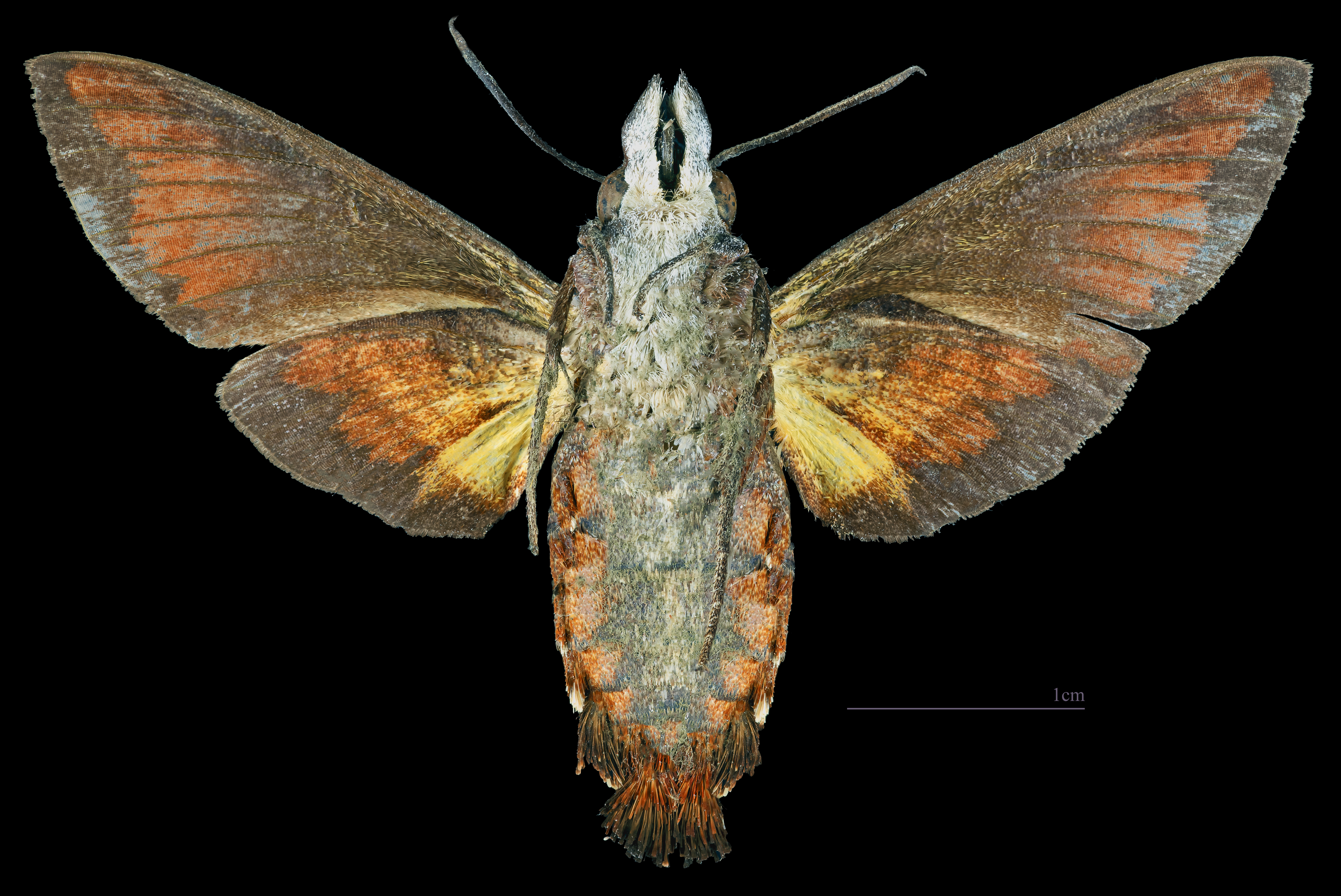
- Male ventral

Scientific classification
- Kingdom: Animalia
- Phylum: Arthropoda
- Class: Insecta
- Order: Lepidoptera
- Family: Sphingidae
- Genus: Macroglossum
- Species: M. caldum

Binomial name
- Macroglossum caldum Jordan, 1926

= Macroglossum caldum =

Species of moth

Macroglossum caldum is a moth of the family Sphingidae. It is known from Papua New Guinea and the Philippines.

== Subspecies ==
- Macroglossum caldum caldum
- Macroglossum caldum philippinense Clark, 1928 (Philippines)
