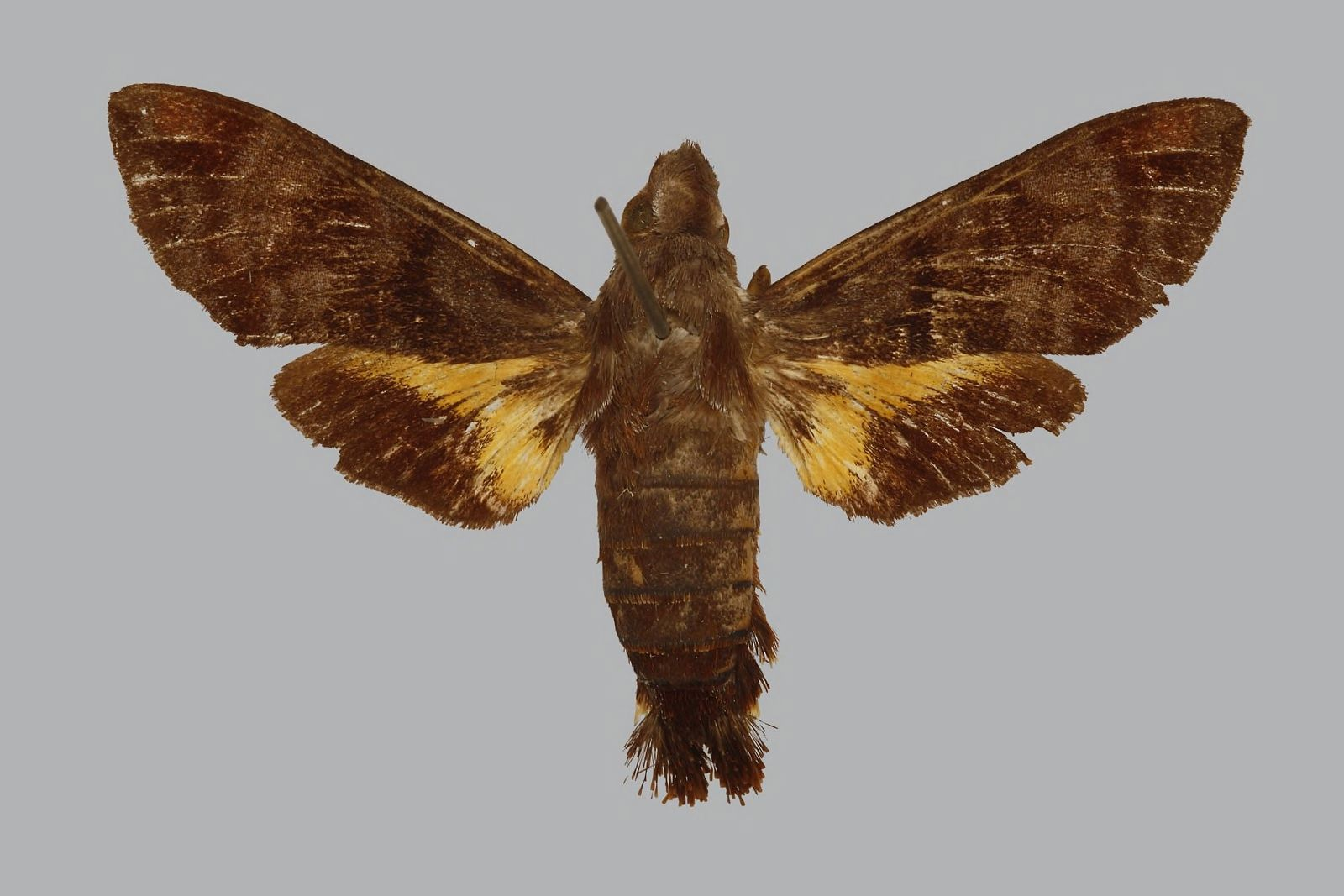

Scientific classification
- Kingdom: Animalia
- Phylum: Arthropoda
- Class: Insecta
- Order: Lepidoptera
- Family: Sphingidae
- Genus: Macroglossum
- Species: M. fruhstorferi

Binomial name
- Macroglossum fruhstorferi Huwe, 1895

= Macroglossum fruhstorferi =

Species of moth

Macroglossum fruhstorferi is a moth of the family Sphingidae. It is known from the Obi Islands and Java.

It is similar to Macroglossum calescens. The underside of the palpus and middle of the thorax are blackish grey, speckled with white scales. The hindwing upperside has a yellow band, while the hindwing underside is yellowish in the basal area.

== Subspecies ==
- Macroglossum fruhstorferi fruhstorferi
- Macroglossum fruhstorferi latifascia Rothschild & Jordan, 1903 (Obi Islands in Indonesia)
