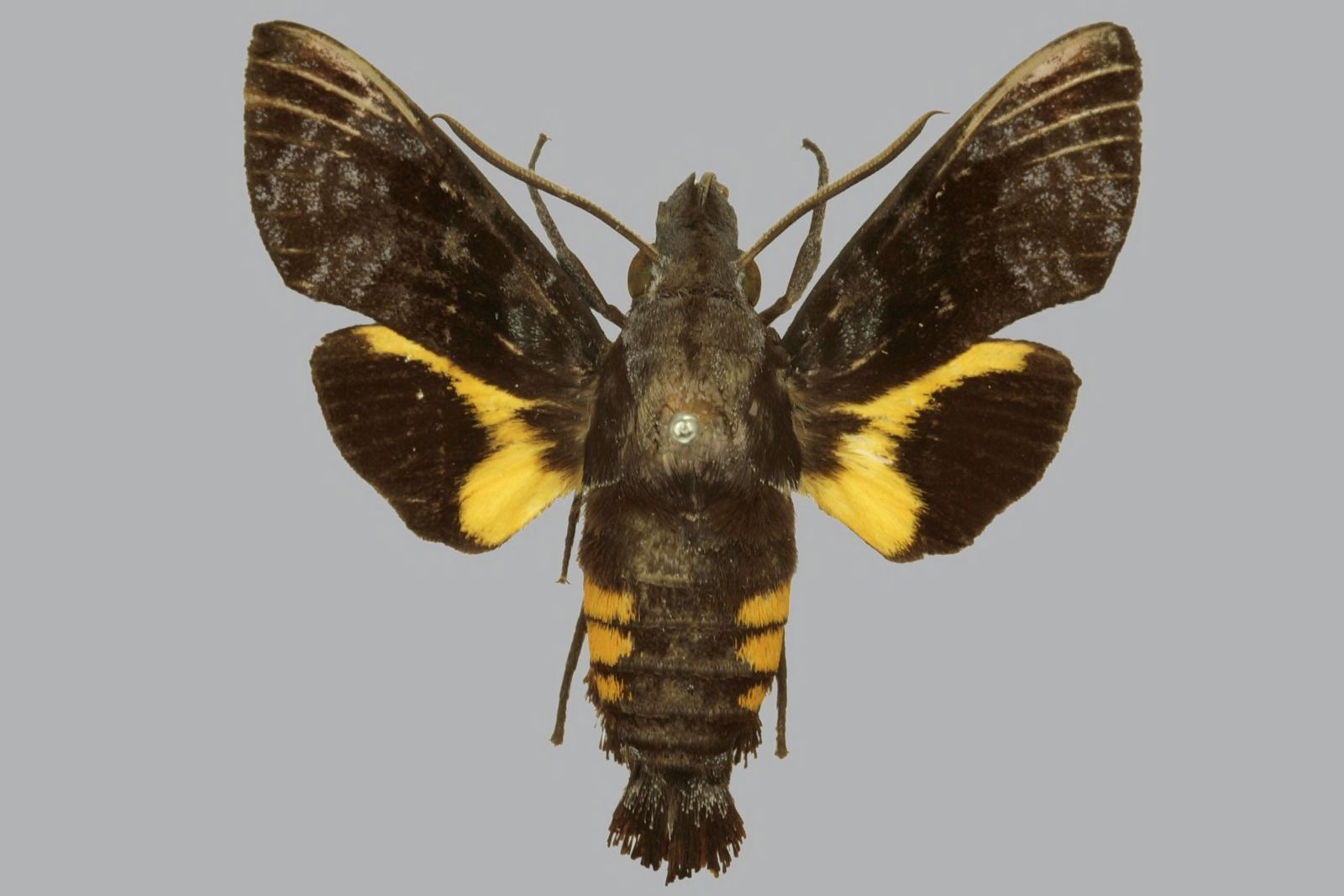
- Male

Scientific classification
- Kingdom: Animalia
- Phylum: Arthropoda
- Class: Insecta
- Order: Lepidoptera
- Family: Sphingidae
- Genus: Macroglossum
- Species: M. calescens

Binomial name
- Macroglossum calescens Butler, 1882

= Macroglossum calescens =

Species of moth

Macroglossum calescens is a moth of the family Sphingidae. It is known from Papua New Guinea.

The head upperside is dark grey with a blackish mesial stripe and a distinct white line above the eye. The thorax and abdomen uppersides are black with a chestnut tint, although the anterior part of the thorax is speckled with white tipped scales. The abdomen has yellow lateral patches. The dorsal and ventral basal scales of the tail are white-tipped and the side tufts are all white tipped. The palpus and middle of the thorax are white, speckled with black scales. The forewing upperside is black. Both wing undersides are reddish-chestnut, with the proximal area deep brown and the extreme bases slightly yellow. The hindwing upperside has a narrow yellow band.
