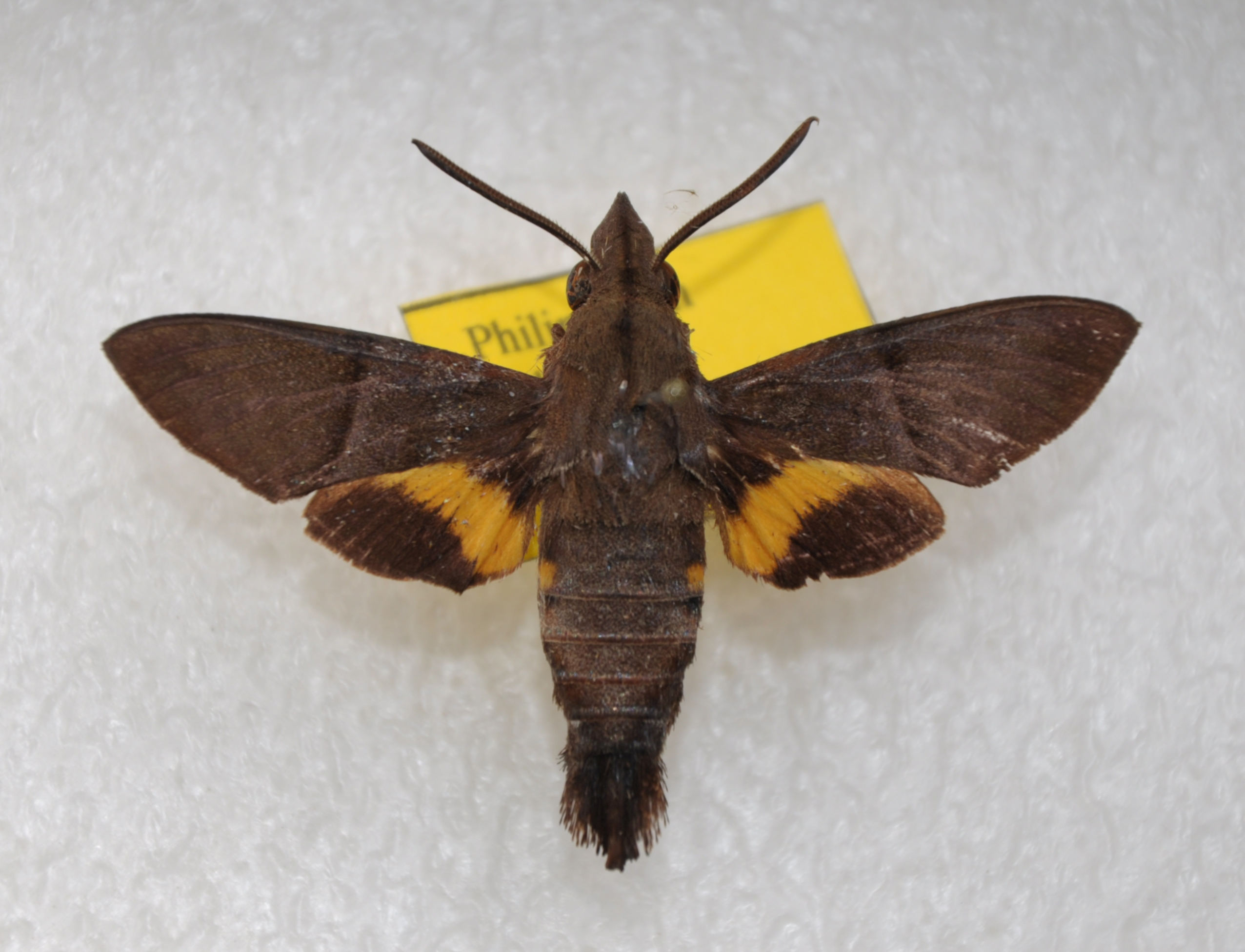

Scientific classification
- Kingdom: Animalia
- Phylum: Arthropoda
- Class: Insecta
- Order: Lepidoptera
- Family: Sphingidae
- Genus: Macroglossum
- Species: M. jani

Binomial name
- Macroglossum jani Hogenes & Treadaway, 1998

= Macroglossum jani =

Species of moth

Macroglossum jani is a moth of the family Sphingidae. It is known from the Philippines.

It is extremely similar to Macroglossum clemensi, but the forewing pattern is somewhat more dull. Furthermore, the pale scaling along the oblique median band and submarginal line is very faint or even absent.
