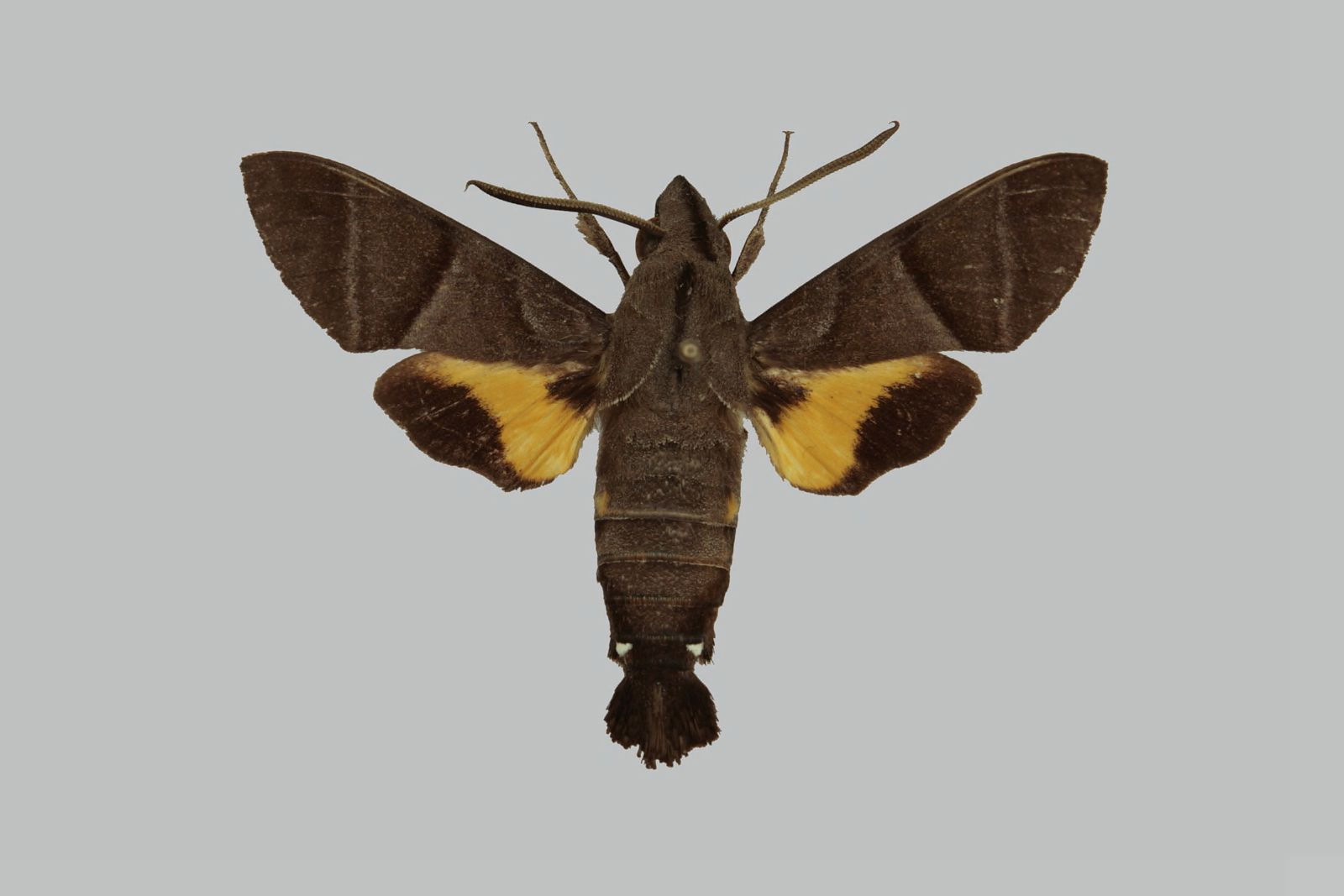
- Male museum specimen

Scientific classification
- Kingdom: Animalia
- Phylum: Arthropoda
- Clade: Pancrustacea
- Class: Insecta
- Order: Lepidoptera
- Family: Sphingidae
- Genus: Macroglossum
- Species: M. clemensi

Binomial name
- Macroglossum clemensi Cadiou, 1998

Synonyms
- Macroglossum johani Brechlin, 1998

= Macroglossum clemensi =

Species of moth

Macroglossum clemensi is a moth of the family Sphingidae. It is known from Sulawesi.
