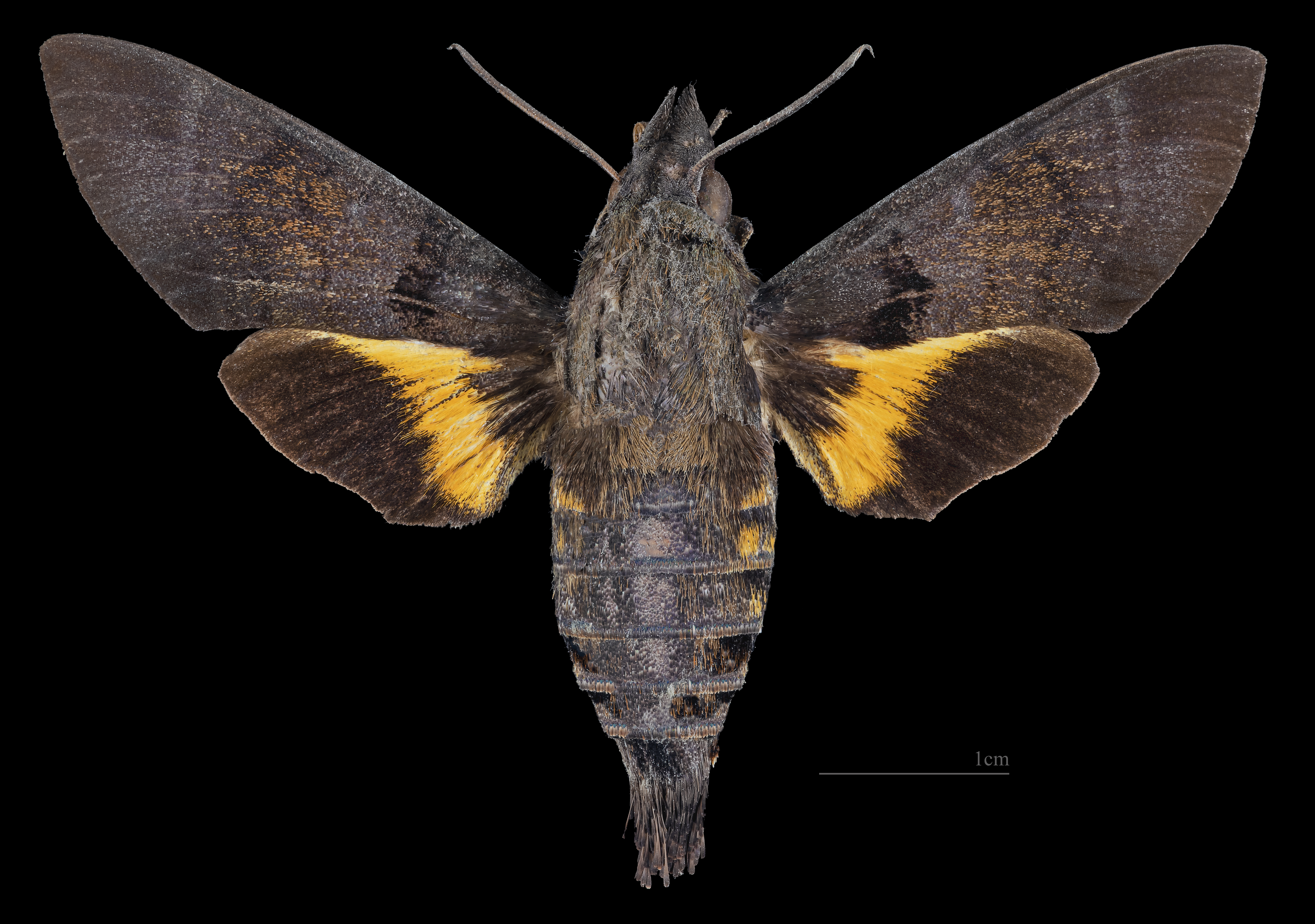
- Macroglossum nigellum Male dorsal
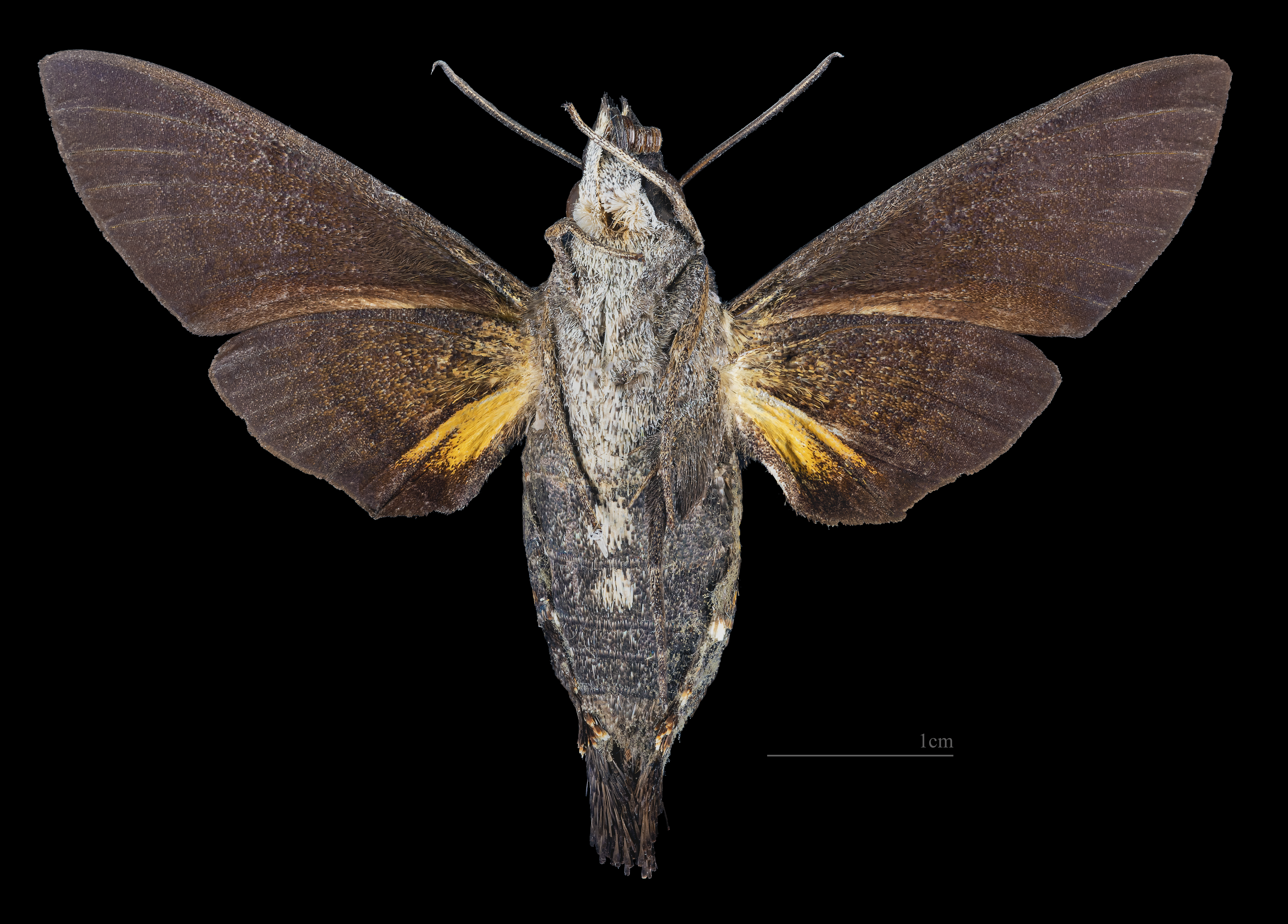
- Macroglossum nigellum Male ventral

Scientific classification
- Kingdom: Animalia
- Phylum: Arthropoda
- Class: Insecta
- Order: Lepidoptera
- Family: Sphingidae
- Genus: Macroglossum
- Species: M. nigellum

Binomial name
- Macroglossum nigellum Rothschild & Jordan, 1916

= Macroglossum nigellum =

Species of moth

Macroglossum nigellum is a moth of the family Sphingidae. It is known from Indonesia (including Java and Sulawesi).

== Subspecies ==
- Macroglossum nigellum nigellum
- Macroglossum nigellum integrifasciatum Hogenes & Treadaway, 1996 (Sulawesi)
- Macroglossum nigellum speideli Eitschberger, 2006 (Sulawesi)
