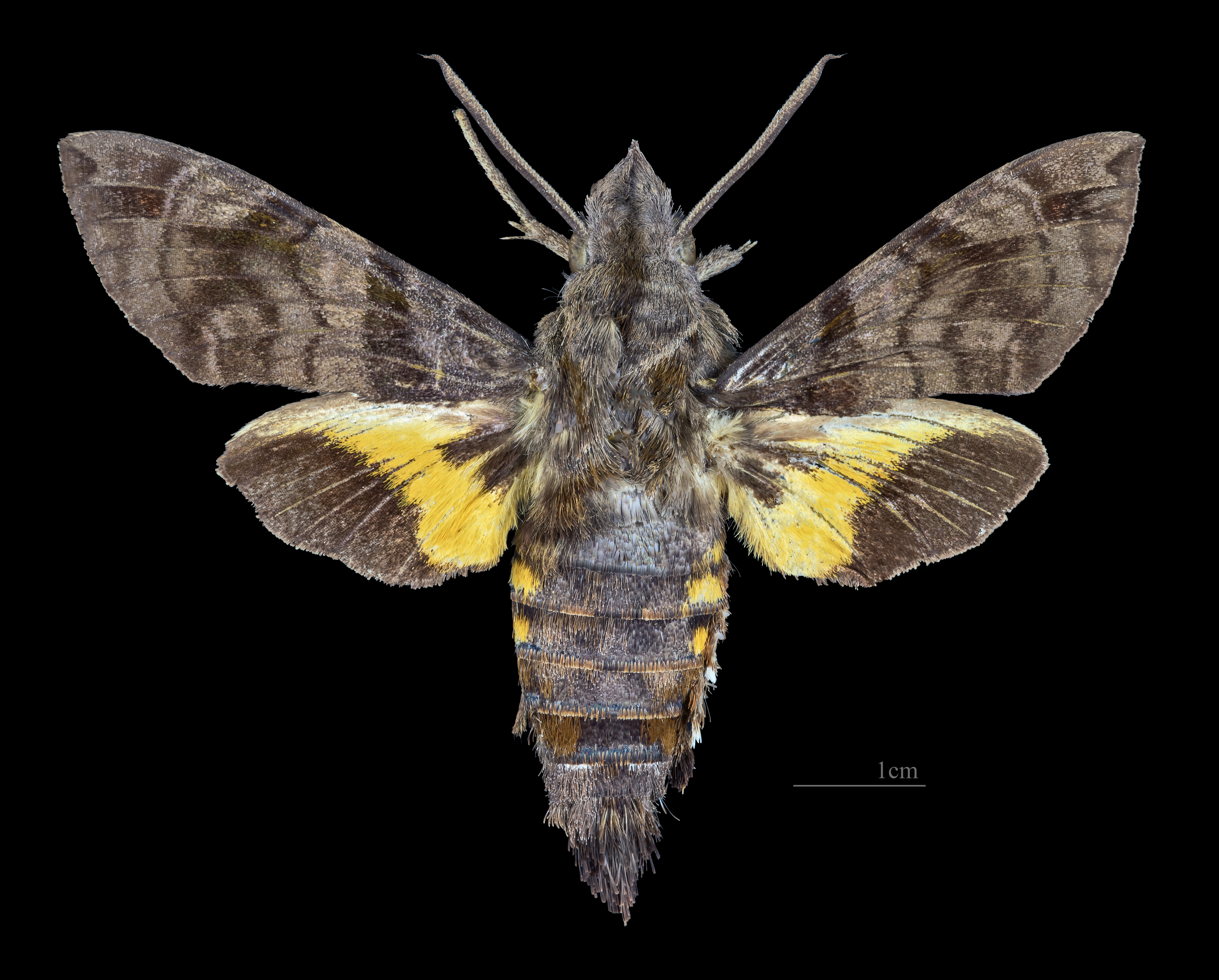
- dorsal
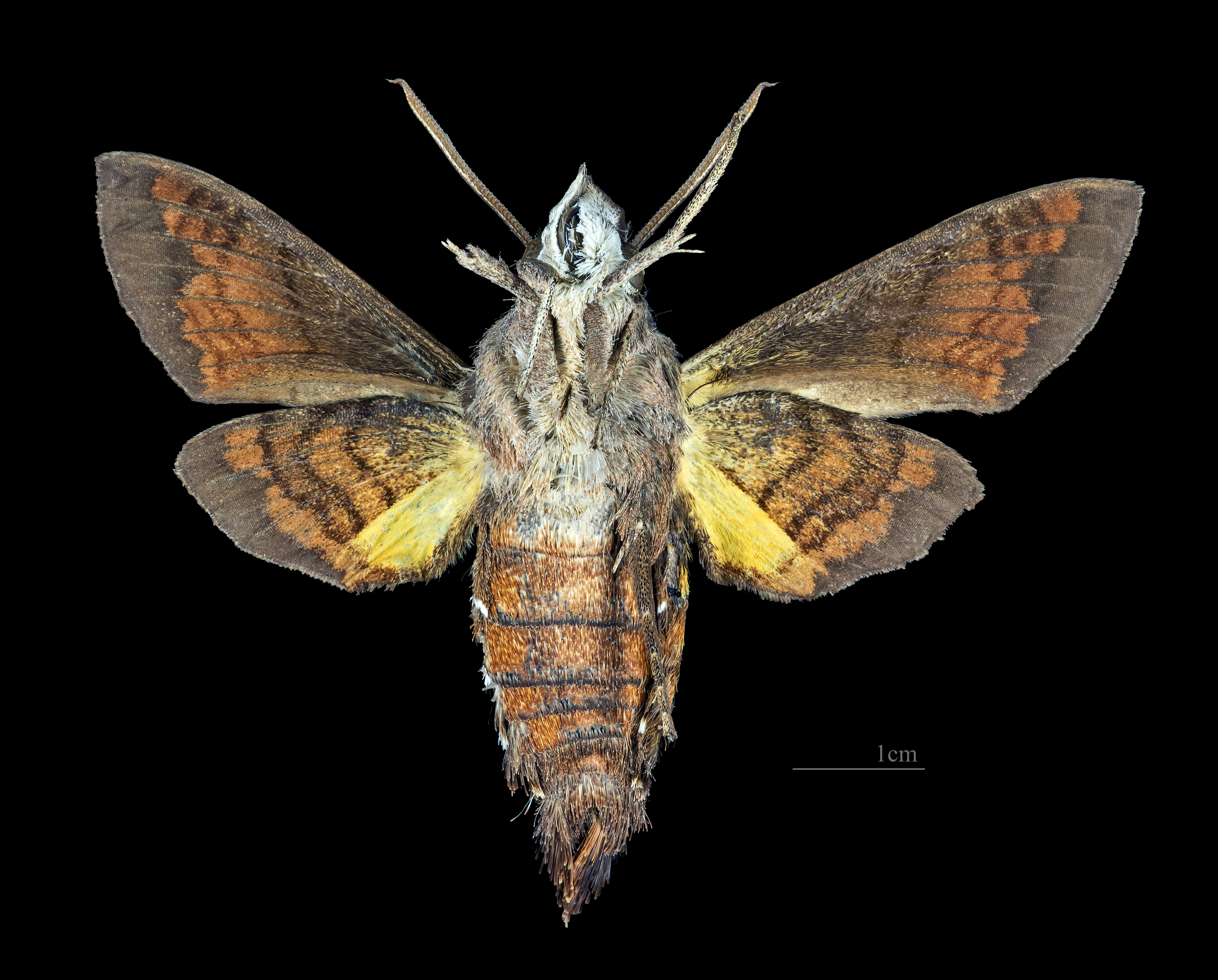
- ventral

Scientific classification
- Kingdom: Animalia
- Phylum: Arthropoda
- Class: Insecta
- Order: Lepidoptera
- Family: Sphingidae
- Genus: Macroglossum
- Species: M. ungues

Binomial name
- Macroglossum ungues Rothschild & Jordan, 1903

Synonyms
- Macroglossum lanyuana Chen, 1994

= Macroglossum ungues =

Species of moth

Macroglossum ungues is a moth of the Sphingidae family. It is known from Indonesia, from Java to Ambon, and also the Philippines and Taiwan.

== Subspecies ==
- Macroglossum ungues ungues
- Macroglossum ungues cheni Yen, Kitching & Tzen, 2003 (Lanyu Island in Taiwan)
