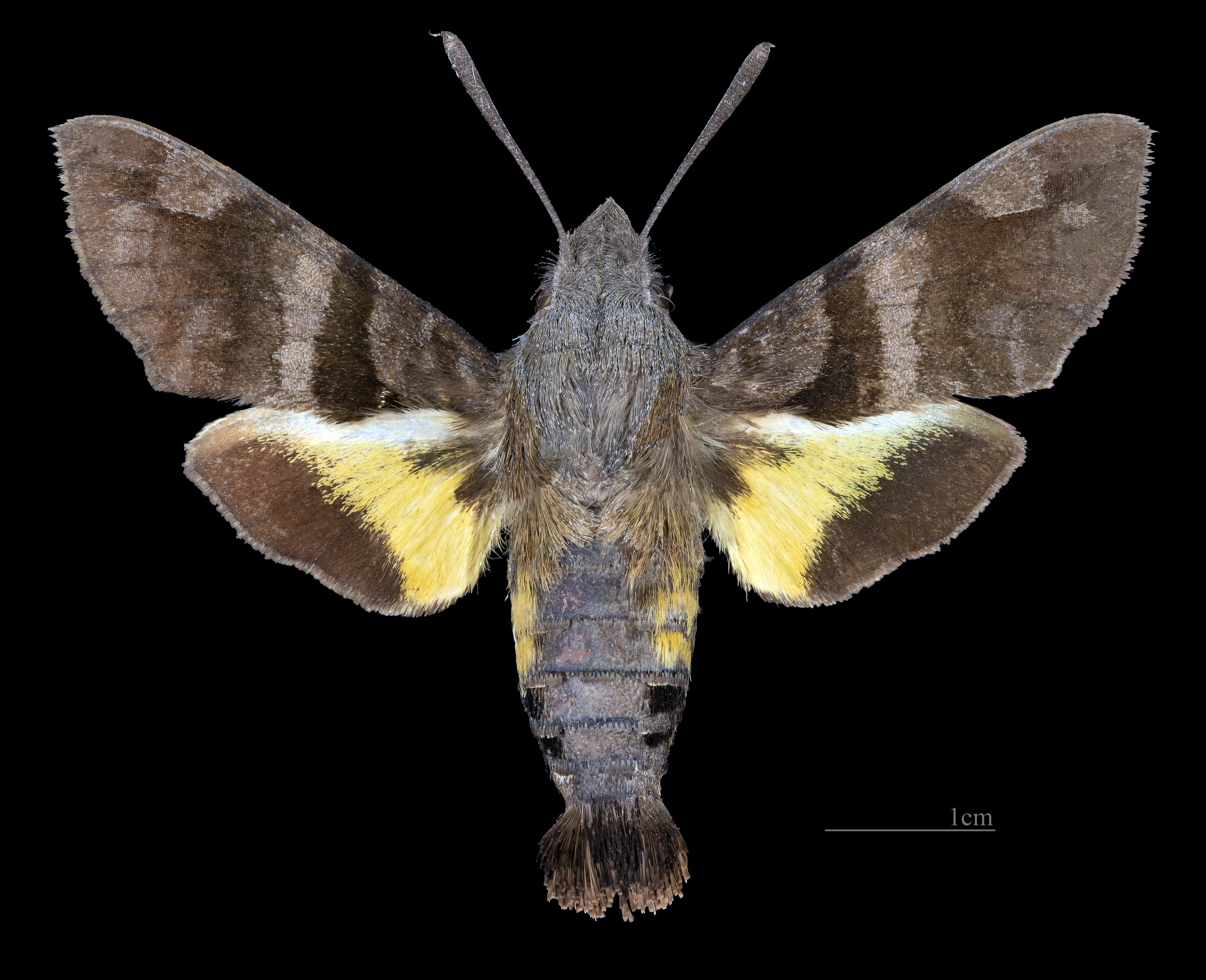
- Male dorsal
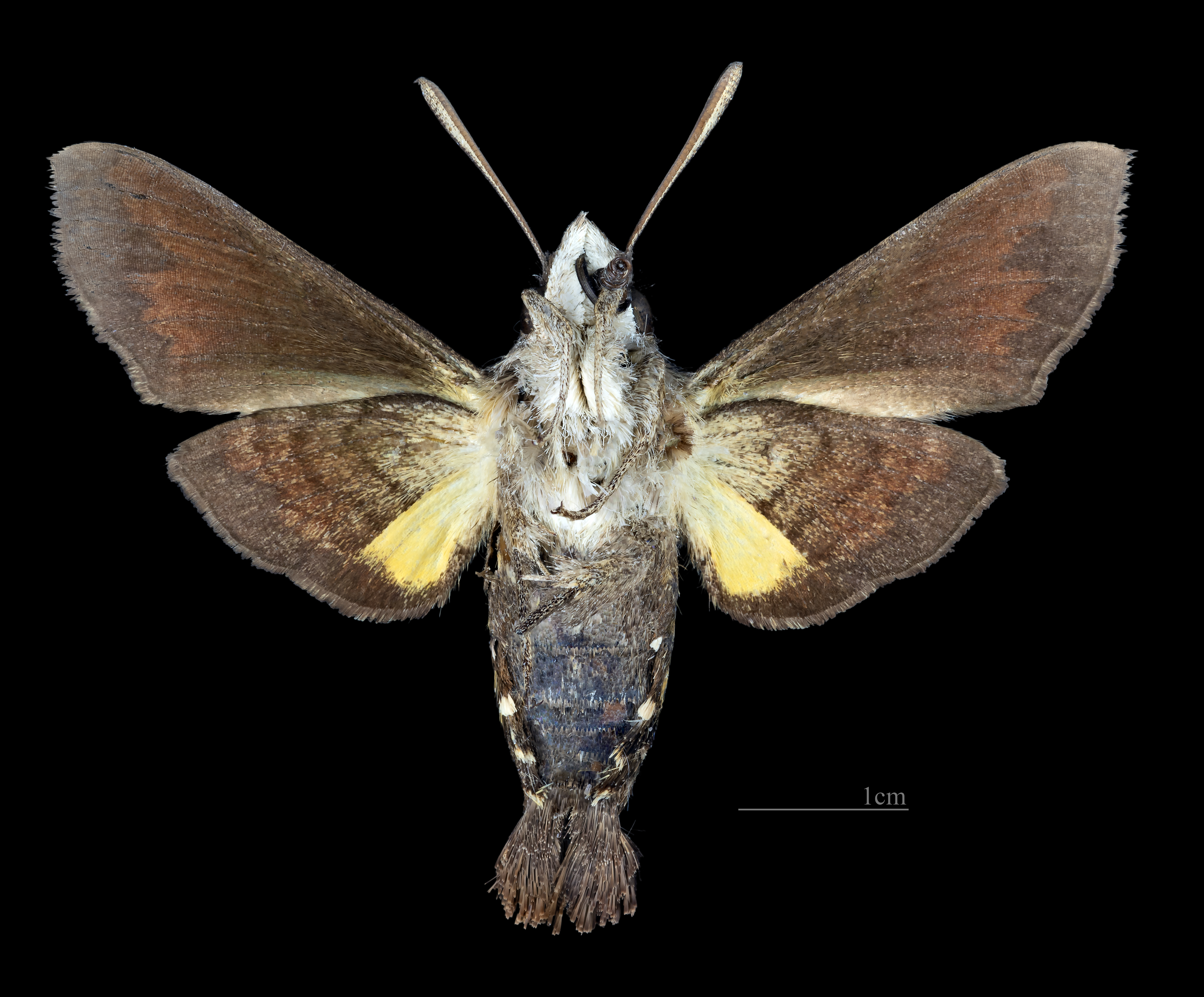
- Male ventral

Scientific classification
- Kingdom: Animalia
- Phylum: Arthropoda
- Class: Insecta
- Order: Lepidoptera
- Family: Sphingidae
- Genus: Macroglossum
- Species: M. bifasciata

Binomial name
- Macroglossum bifasciata (Butler, 1875)

Synonyms
- Rhopalopsyche bifasciata Butler, 1875

= Macroglossum bifasciata =

Species of moth

Macroglossum bifasciata is a moth of the family Sphingidae. It is known from India.

The abdominal lateral patches are deep chrome yellow. The underside of both wings is ferruginous tawny and the hindwing upperside has a band of deep chrome.
