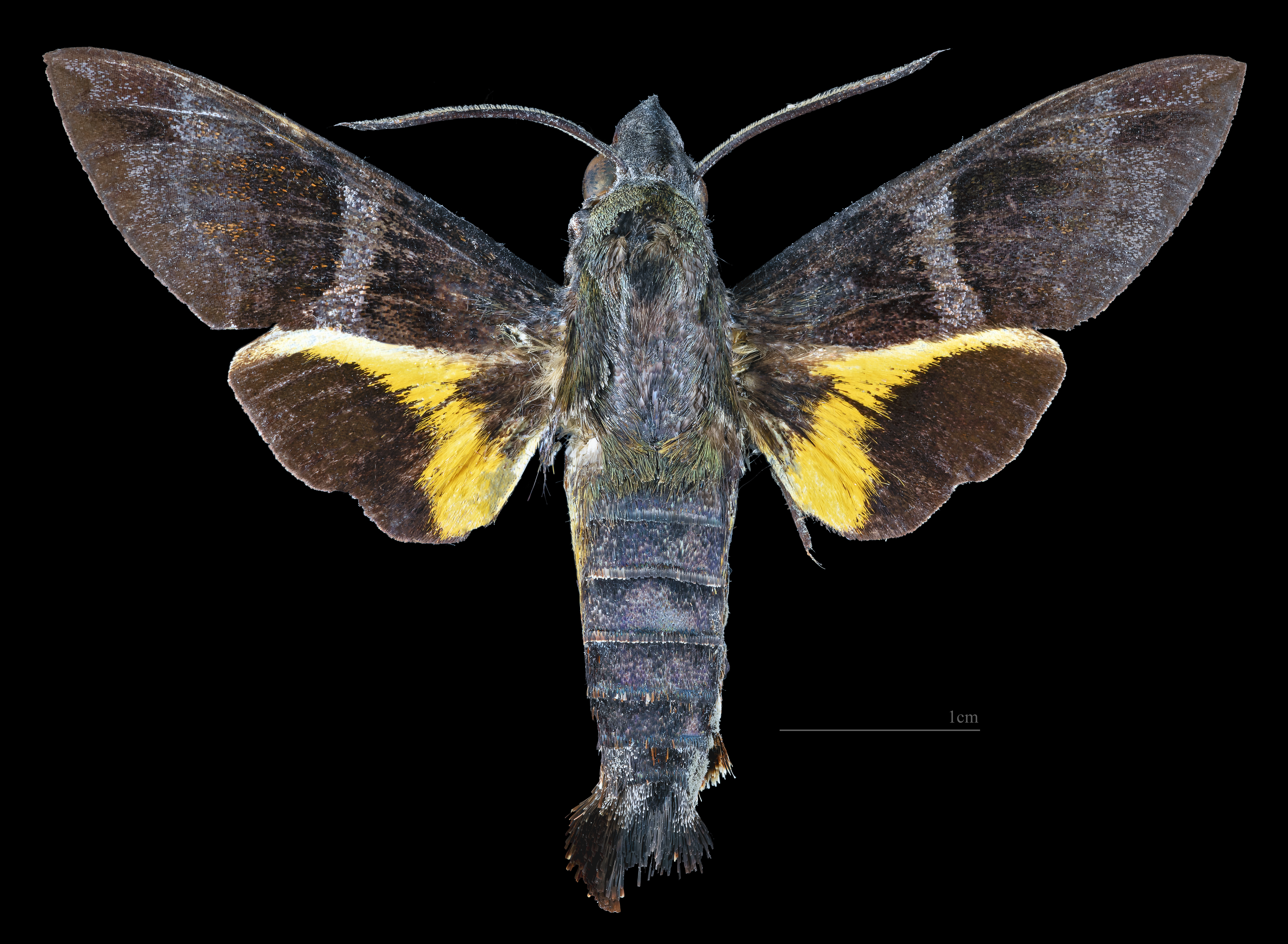
- Male dorsal view
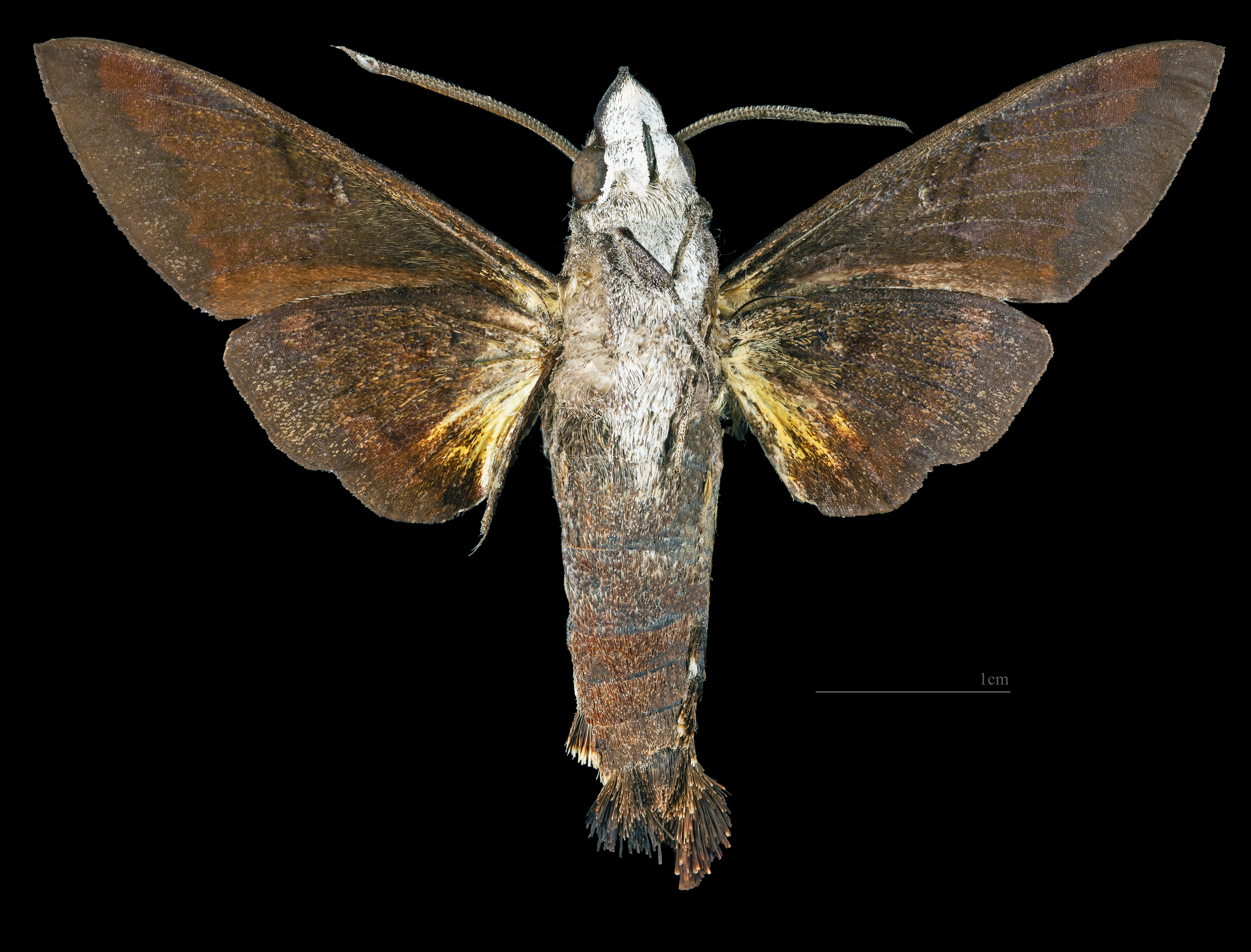
- Male ventral view

Scientific classification
- Kingdom: Animalia
- Phylum: Arthropoda
- Clade: Pancrustacea
- Class: Insecta
- Order: Lepidoptera
- Family: Sphingidae
- Genus: Macroglossum
- Species: M. kitchingi

Binomial name
- Macroglossum kitchingi Cadiou, 1997

= Macroglossum kitchingi =

Species of moth

Macroglossum kitchingi is a moth of the family Sphingidae first described by Jean-Marie Cadiou in 1997. It is native to Sulawesi, Indonesia.
