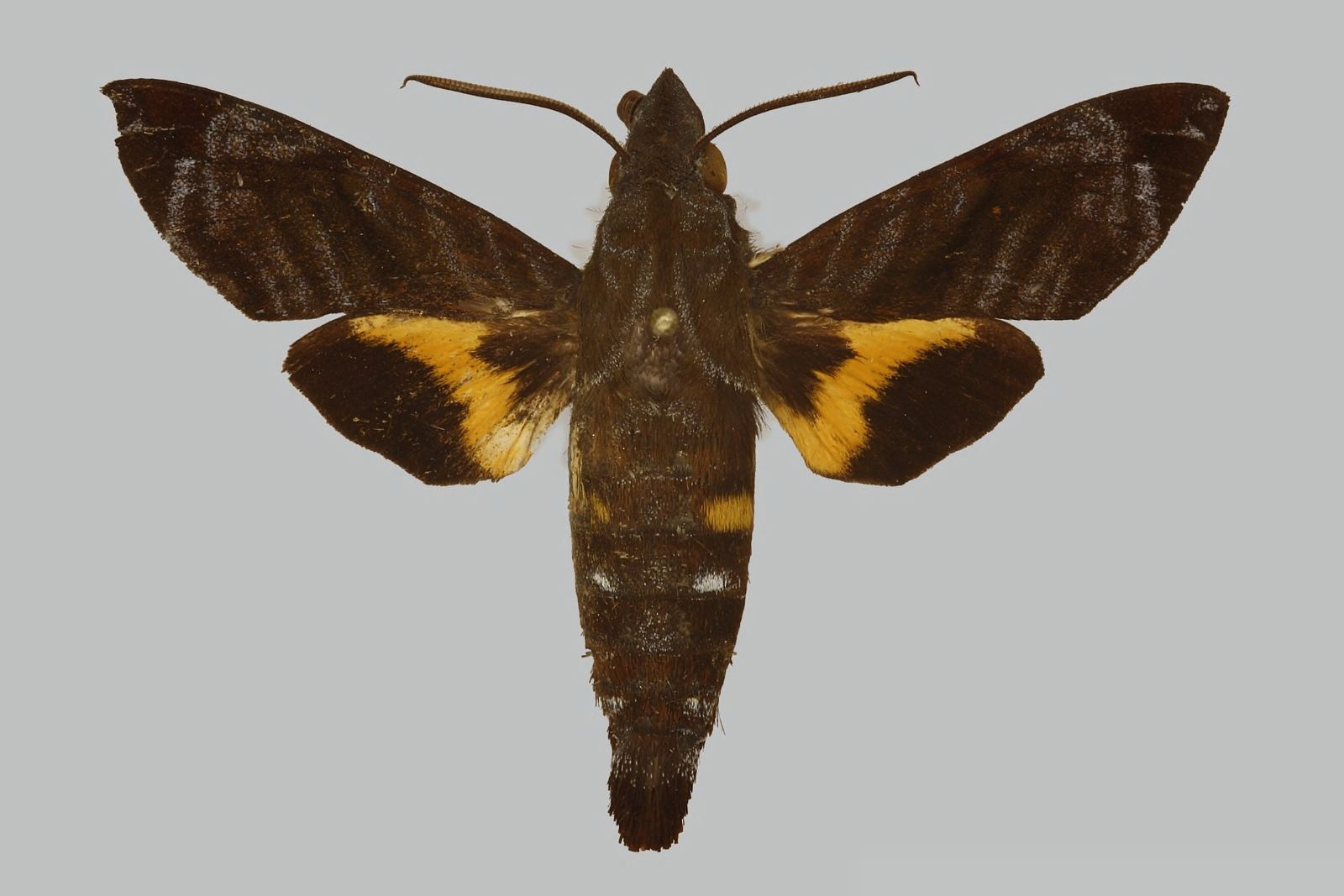

Scientific classification
- Kingdom: Animalia
- Phylum: Arthropoda
- Class: Insecta
- Order: Lepidoptera
- Family: Sphingidae
- Genus: Macroglossum
- Species: M. multifascia

Binomial name
- Macroglossum multifascia Rothschild & Jordan, 1903

= Macroglossum multifascia =

Species of moth

Macroglossum multifascia is a moth of the family Sphingidae. It is known from Malaysia and the Philippines.

The striped pattern of the forewing distinguishes this species from other Macroglossum species. The upperside is dark chocolate brown. The head and thorax uppersides have a greyish flush. The abdomen upperside has one yellow transverse spot, a white dorso-lateral spot and some white scaling on the posterior segments. The side tufts are tipped with white. The tail is chocolate tawny in the male, but paler in the female. The abdomen underside is pale rusty brown, the middle is darker brown and shaded with grey. The tail is paler than the upperside. Both wing undersides are pale rusty brown on the disc. The hindwing upperside has a yellow band which is not interrupted. It is broader in the female than in the male. The hindwing underside is suffused with yellow from the base to the marginal band in the female and less extensively yellow in the male.
