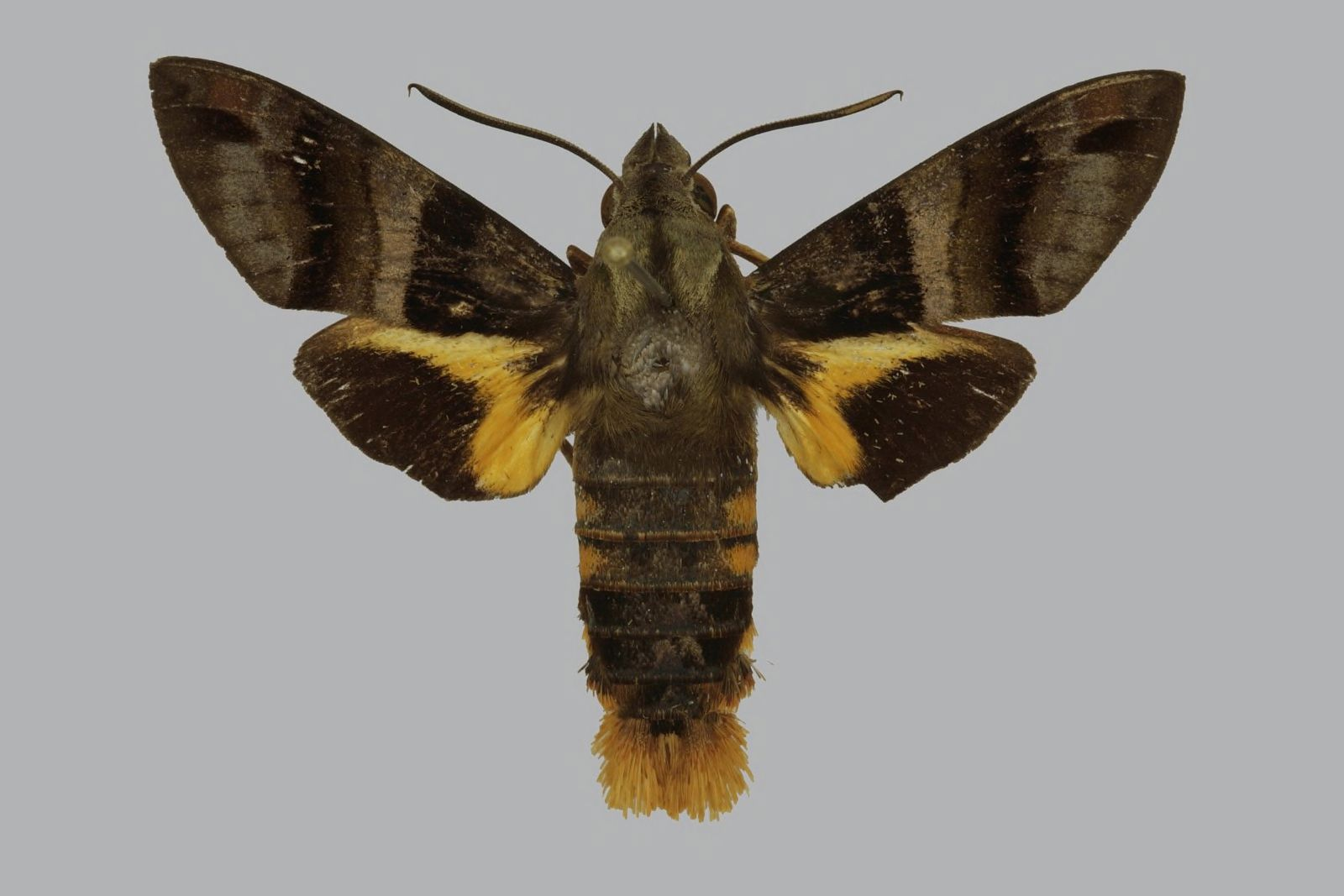

Scientific classification
- Kingdom: Animalia
- Phylum: Arthropoda
- Class: Insecta
- Order: Lepidoptera
- Family: Sphingidae
- Genus: Macroglossum
- Species: M. eichhorni

Binomial name
- Macroglossum eichhorni Rothschild & Jordan, 1903

= Macroglossum eichhorni =

Species of moth

Macroglossum eichhorni is a moth of the family Sphingidae. It is known from the Solomon Islands.

The length of the forewings 24–25 mm. The head and thorax uppersides are brown, with a dark mesial stripe. The head has a white line above the eye. The palpus underside is whitish grey. The thorax underside is buff mesially, the sides are darker. The abdomen underside is tawny ochraceous, with darker sides. The forewing upperside has a blackish basal area, but not so dark as the antemedian band. Both wing undersides are chestnut, with brown distal margins. The forewing underside has a yellow base. The hindwing upperside has a constricted yellow band, the black border is broad and strongly convex. The hindwing undersides have a yellow basal half. The anal area is deeper yellow.
