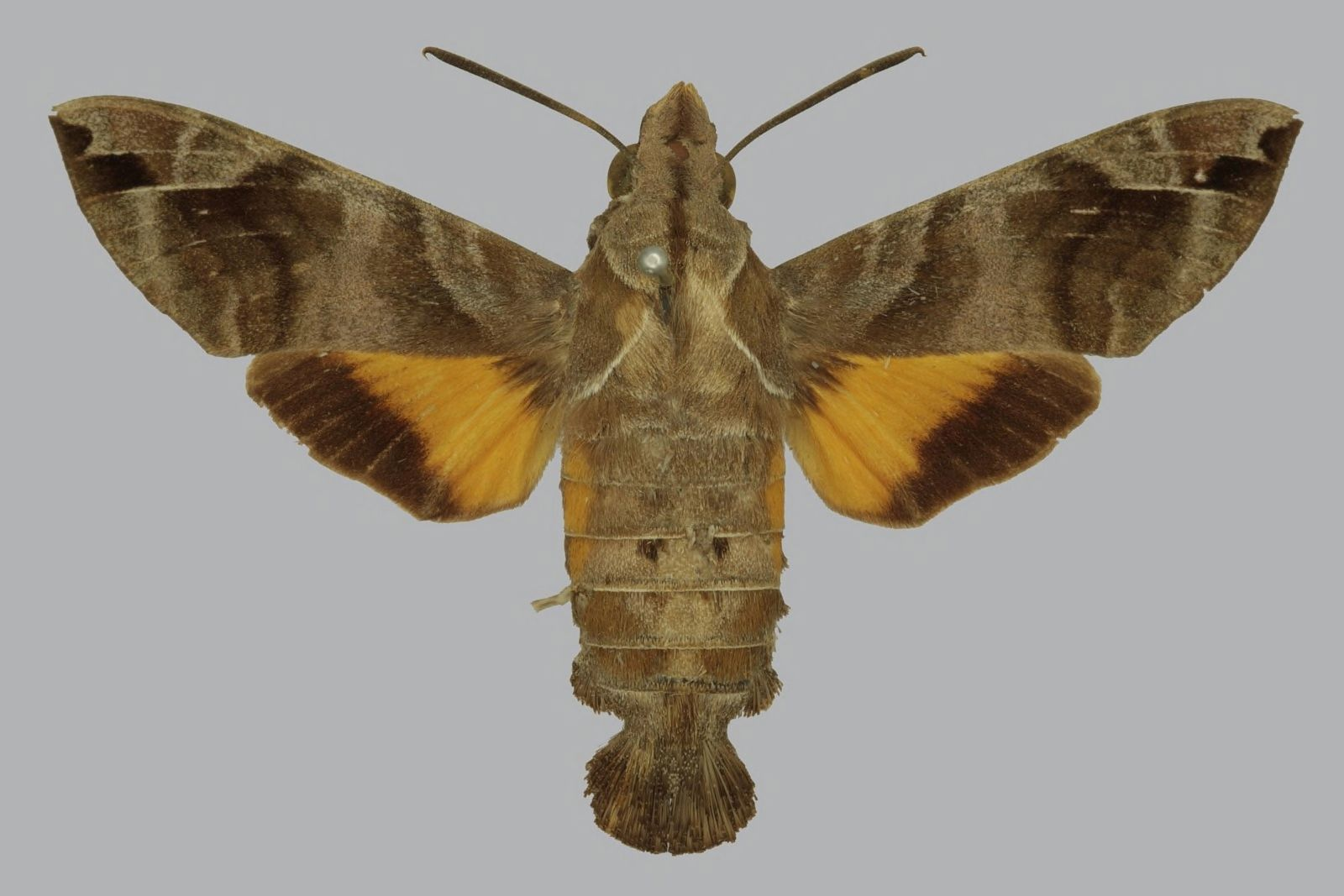
- Macroglossum particolor, female, upperside

Scientific classification
- Kingdom: Animalia
- Phylum: Arthropoda
- Class: Insecta
- Order: Lepidoptera
- Family: Sphingidae
- Genus: Macroglossum
- Species: M. particolor

Binomial name
- Macroglossum particolor Rothschild & Jordan, 1903

= Macroglossum particolor =

Species of moth

Macroglossum particrolo is a moth of the family Sphingidae. It is known from India and Sri Lanka.

The upper side of the body and forewing is drab grey. The head and thorax upper side has a russet-brown mesial line. The abdomen has three rather small orange side patches, not separated from each other. The underside of the palpus is greyish-white, with a white side line. The thorax underside is grey, shaded with wood-brown. The abdomen underside is entirely wood-brown. The forewing upperside is drab grey. Both wing undersides are yellowish brown, shaded with grey, with the distal border brown. The base and broad distal border of the hindwing upperside are blackish brown and somewhat olive. The inner area of the hindwing underside is Yellow.
