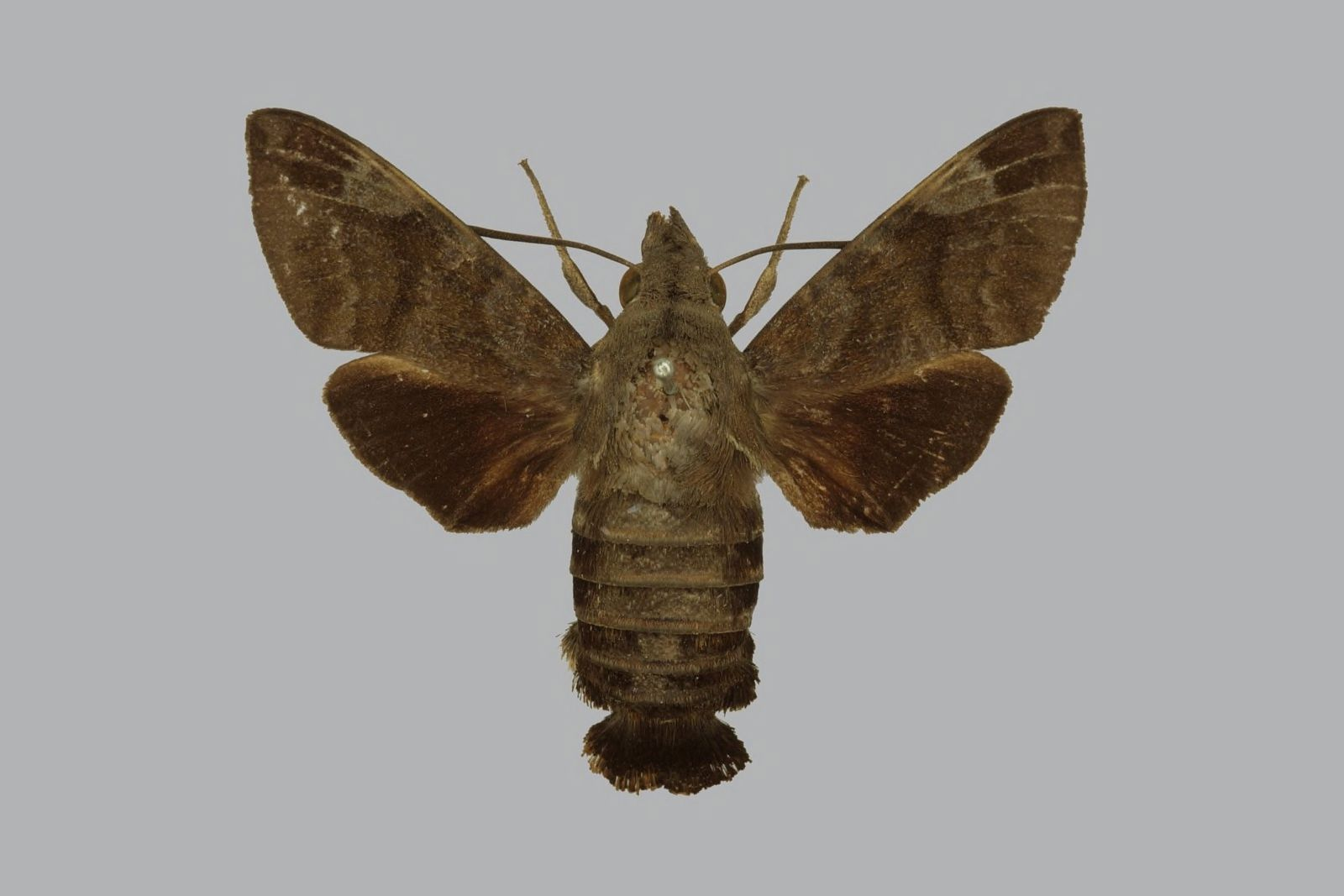

Scientific classification
- Kingdom: Animalia
- Phylum: Arthropoda
- Class: Insecta
- Order: Lepidoptera
- Family: Sphingidae
- Genus: Macroglossum
- Species: M. phocinum

Binomial name
- Macroglossum phocinum Rothschild & Jordan, 1903

= Macroglossum phocinum =

Species of moth

Macroglossum phocinum is a moth of the family Sphingidae. It is found in the Solomon Islands.

The length of the forewings is about 25 mm. The head and thorax upperside are deep olive green, with a dark mesial stripe. The abdomen upperside is blackish olive, with a pair of black basal spots and large black lateral patches. The palpus, middle of the thorax and abdomen basal segment undersides are dirty grey. The abdomen underside is blackish-brown and the side-tufts are tipped with buffish white, except the last. The forewing upperside is deep olive green. Both wing undersides are brown and the base of the hindwing is shaded with cinnamon and grey. The hindwing upperside is dark brown, shaded with burnt-umber at and near the inner margin.
