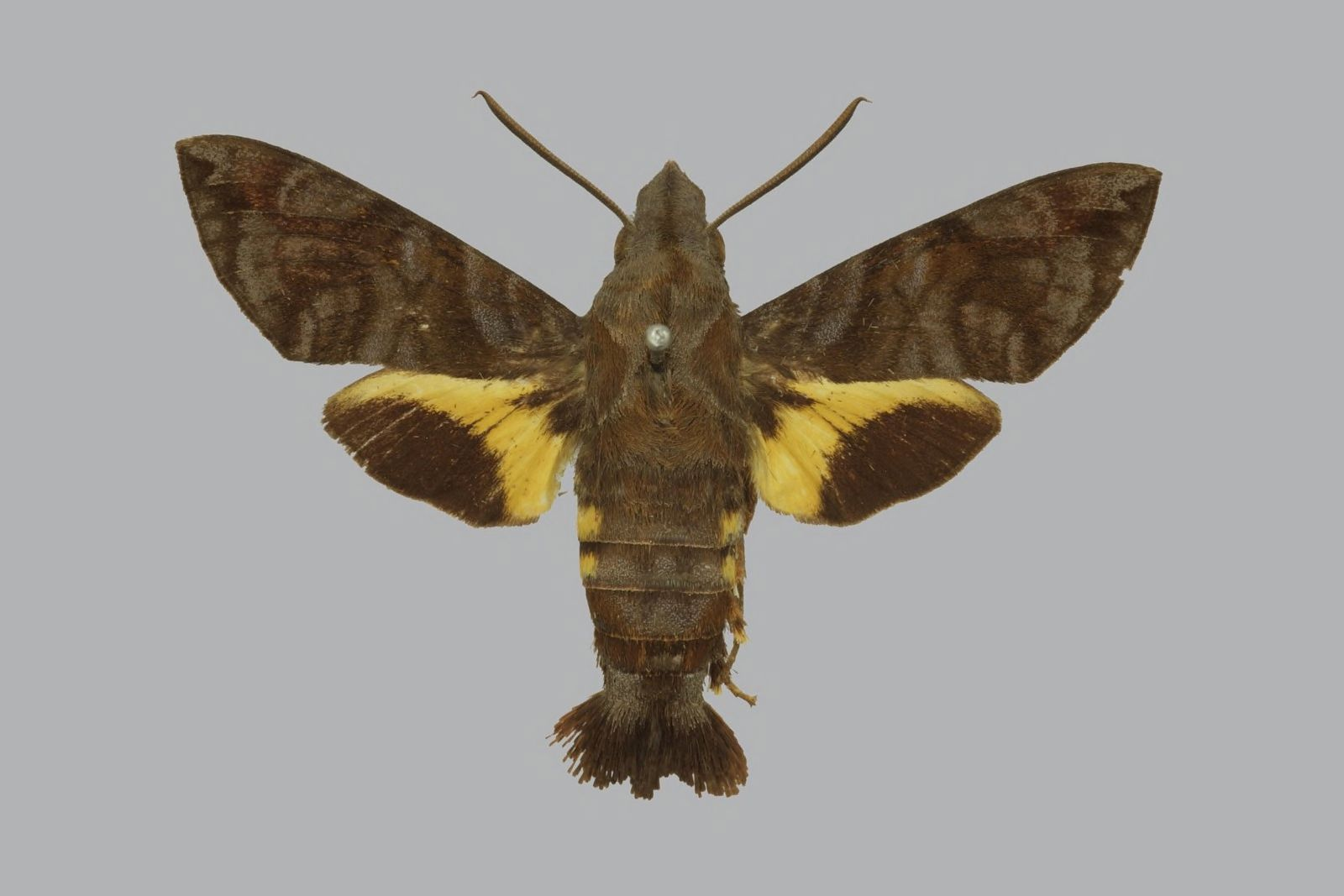
- male, upperside.

Scientific classification
- Kingdom: Animalia
- Phylum: Arthropoda
- Clade: Pancrustacea
- Class: Insecta
- Order: Lepidoptera
- Family: Sphingidae
- Genus: Macroglossum
- Species: M. neotroglodytus

Binomial name
- Macroglossum neotroglodytus Kitching & Cadiou, 2000

Synonyms
- Macroglossum troglodytus ferrea (Mell, 1922)

= Macroglossum neotroglodytus =

Species of moth

Macroglossum neotroglodytus is a moth of the family Sphingidae. It is known from Sri Lanka, southern and north-eastern India, Nepal, southern China, Taiwan, Japan, Thailand, Malaysia (Peninsular), Indonesia (Sumatra, Java, Sulawesi) and the Philippines.
