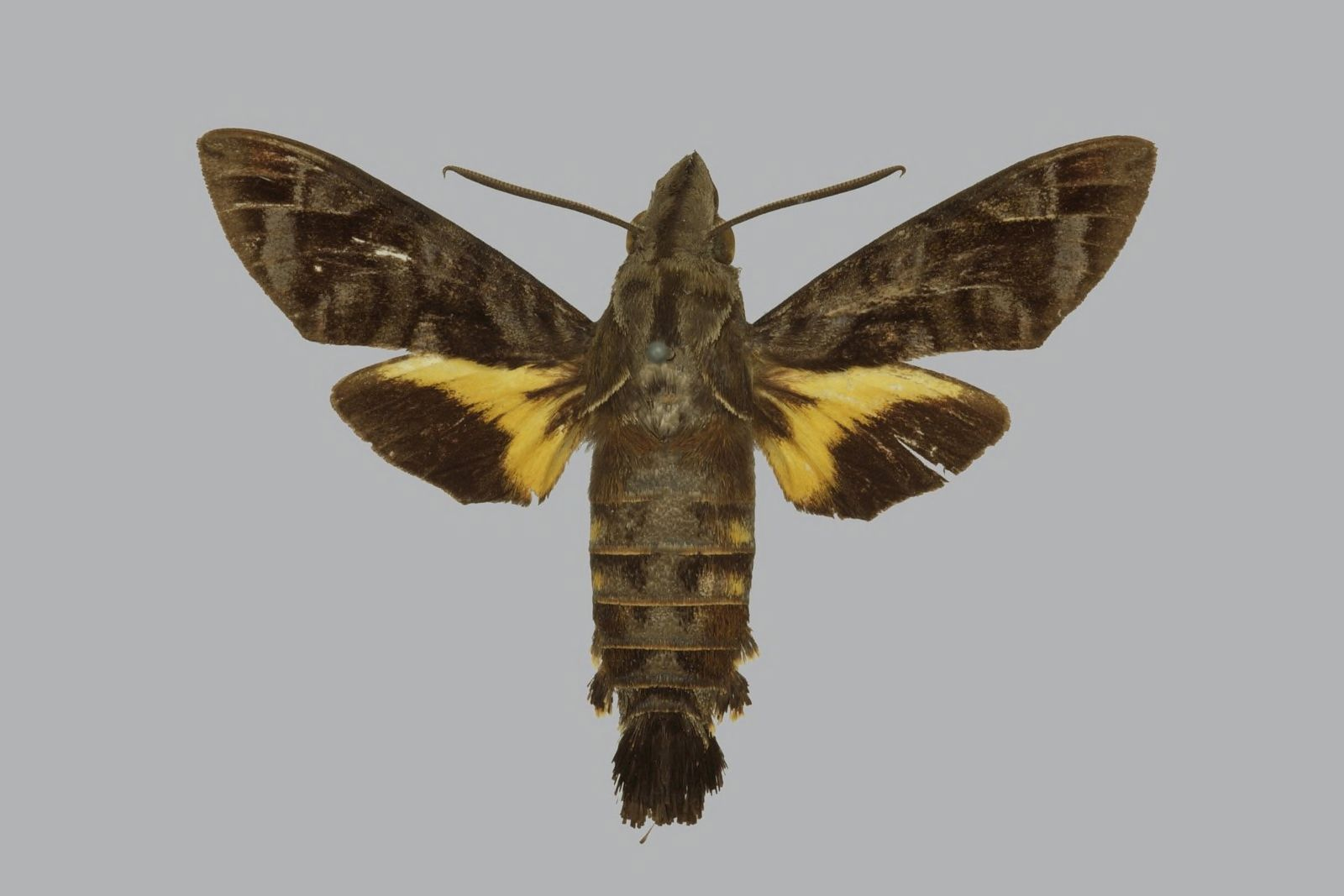

Scientific classification
- Kingdom: Animalia
- Phylum: Arthropoda
- Class: Insecta
- Order: Lepidoptera
- Family: Sphingidae
- Genus: Macroglossum
- Species: M. poecilum

Binomial name
- Macroglossum poecilum Rothschild & Jordan, 1903

Synonyms
- Macroglossum poecilum modestum Seitz, 1929; Macroglossum poecilum ferrea (Mell, 1922)

= Macroglossum poecilum =

Species of moth

Macroglossum poecilum is a moth of the family Sphingidae. It is known from Hong Kong, Taiwan, southern Japan (Ryukyu Archipelago) and Malaysian northern Borneo (Sarawak).

Larvae have been recorded feeding on Lasianthus chinensis in Hong Kong.
