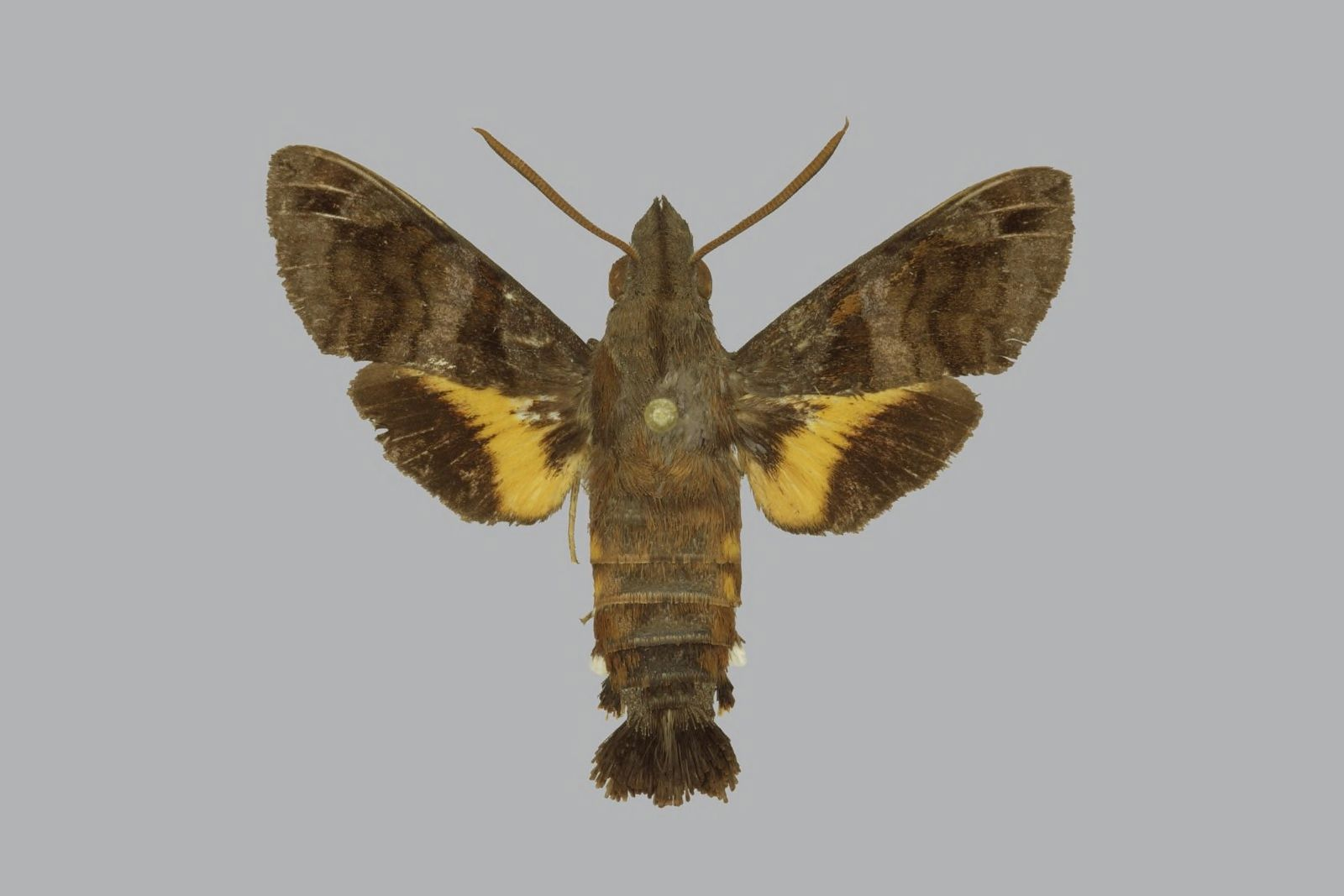
- Male Macroglossum limata

Scientific classification
- Kingdom: Animalia
- Phylum: Arthropoda
- Class: Insecta
- Order: Lepidoptera
- Family: Sphingidae
- Genus: Macroglossum
- Species: M. limata

Binomial name
- Macroglossum limata C. Swinhoe, 1892

Synonyms
- Macroglossum pseudungues Holloway, 1987

= Macroglossum limata =

Species of moth

Macroglossum limata is a moth of the family Sphingidae first described by Charles Swinhoe in 1892. It is known from Thailand, Vietnam and Indonesia.
