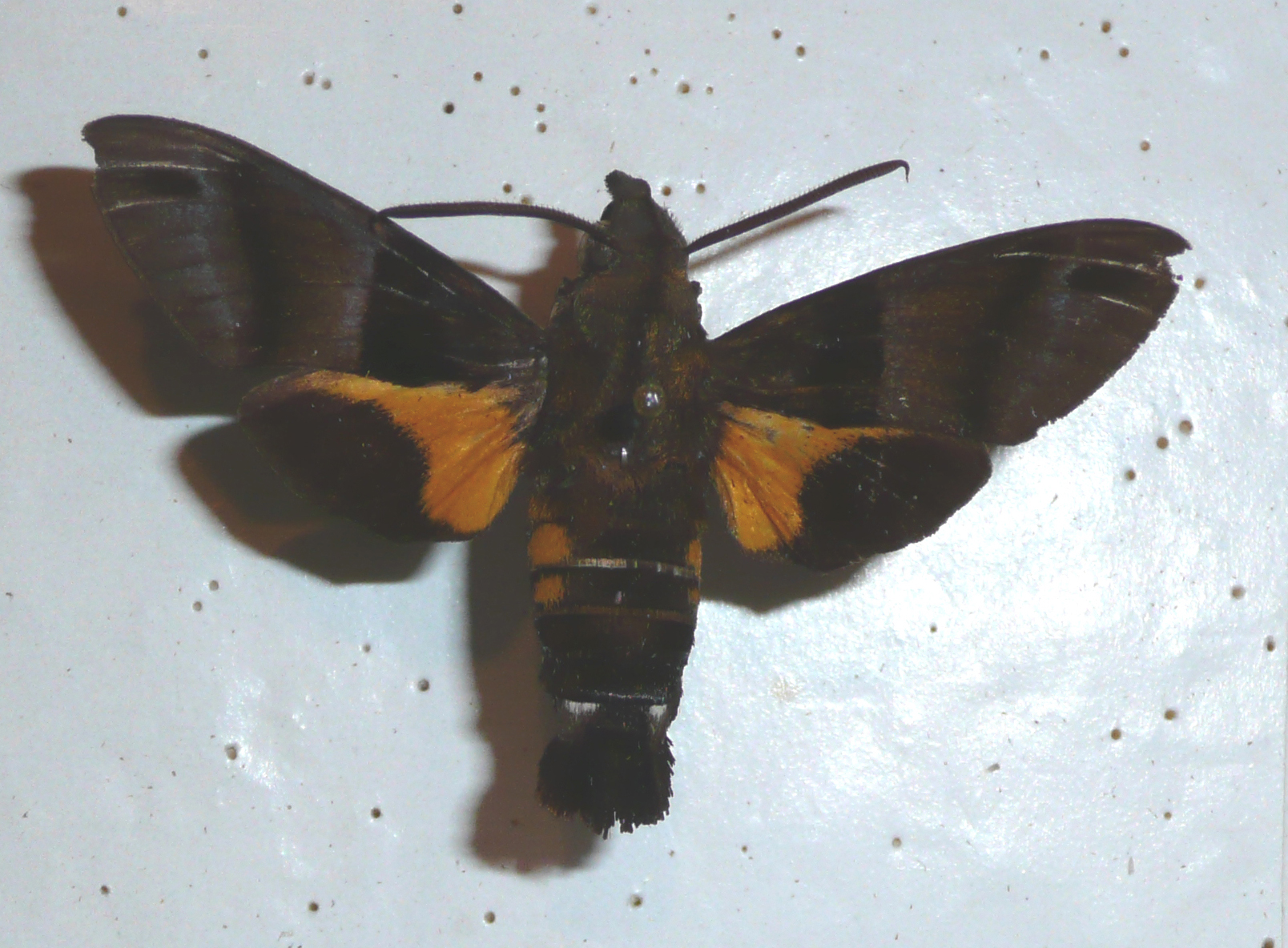

Scientific classification
- Kingdom: Animalia
- Phylum: Arthropoda
- Clade: Pancrustacea
- Class: Insecta
- Order: Lepidoptera
- Family: Sphingidae
- Genus: Macroglossum
- Species: M. schnitzleri

Binomial name
- Macroglossum schnitzleri Cadiou, 1998

= Macroglossum schnitzleri =

Species of moth

Macroglossum schnitzleri is a moth of the family Sphingidae. It is known from the Moluccas.
