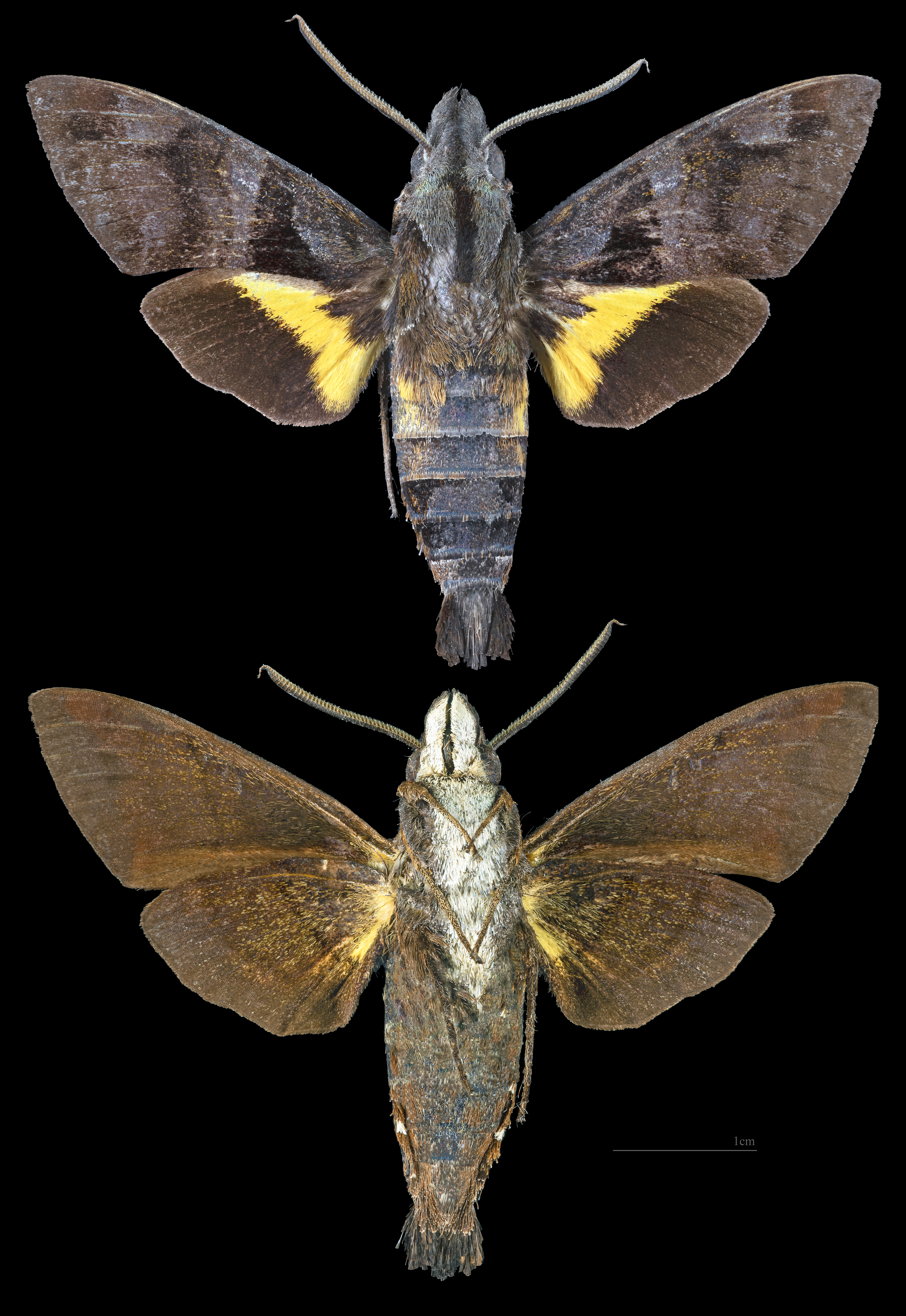
- Macroglossum reithi MHNT

Scientific classification
- Kingdom: Animalia
- Phylum: Arthropoda
- Clade: Pancrustacea
- Class: Insecta
- Order: Lepidoptera
- Family: Sphingidae
- Genus: Macroglossum
- Species: M. reithi

Binomial name
- Macroglossum reithi Cadiou, 1997

= Macroglossum reithi =

Species of moth

Macroglossum reithi is a moth of the family Sphingidae. It is known from Sulawesi.
