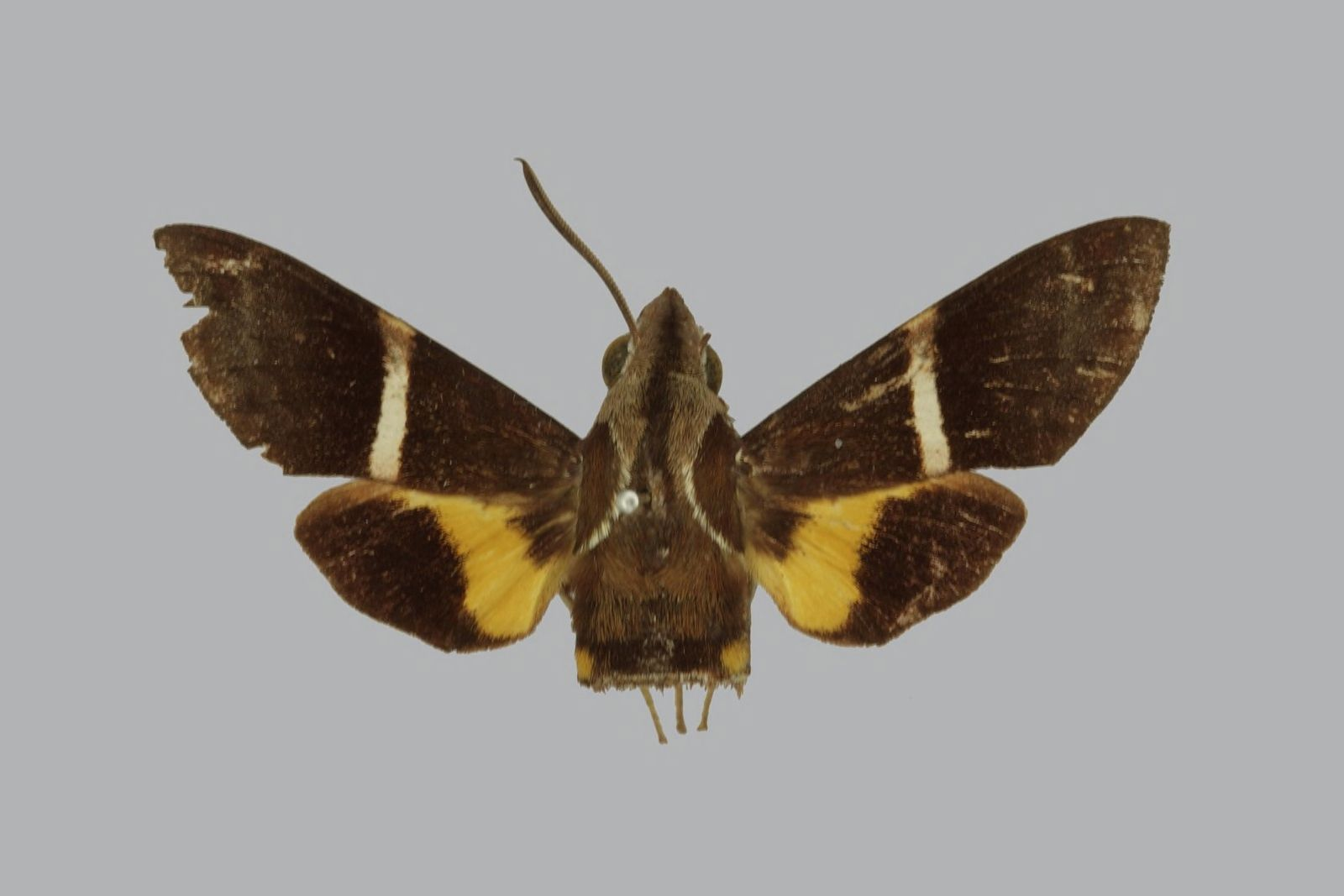

Scientific classification
- Kingdom: Animalia
- Phylum: Arthropoda
- Clade: Pancrustacea
- Class: Insecta
- Order: Lepidoptera
- Family: Sphingidae
- Genus: Macroglossum
- Species: M. mouldsi

Binomial name
- Macroglossum mouldsi Lachlan & Kitching, 2001

= Macroglossum mouldsi =

Species of moth

Macroglossum mouldsi is a moth of the family Sphingidae. It is known from Papua New Guinea.
