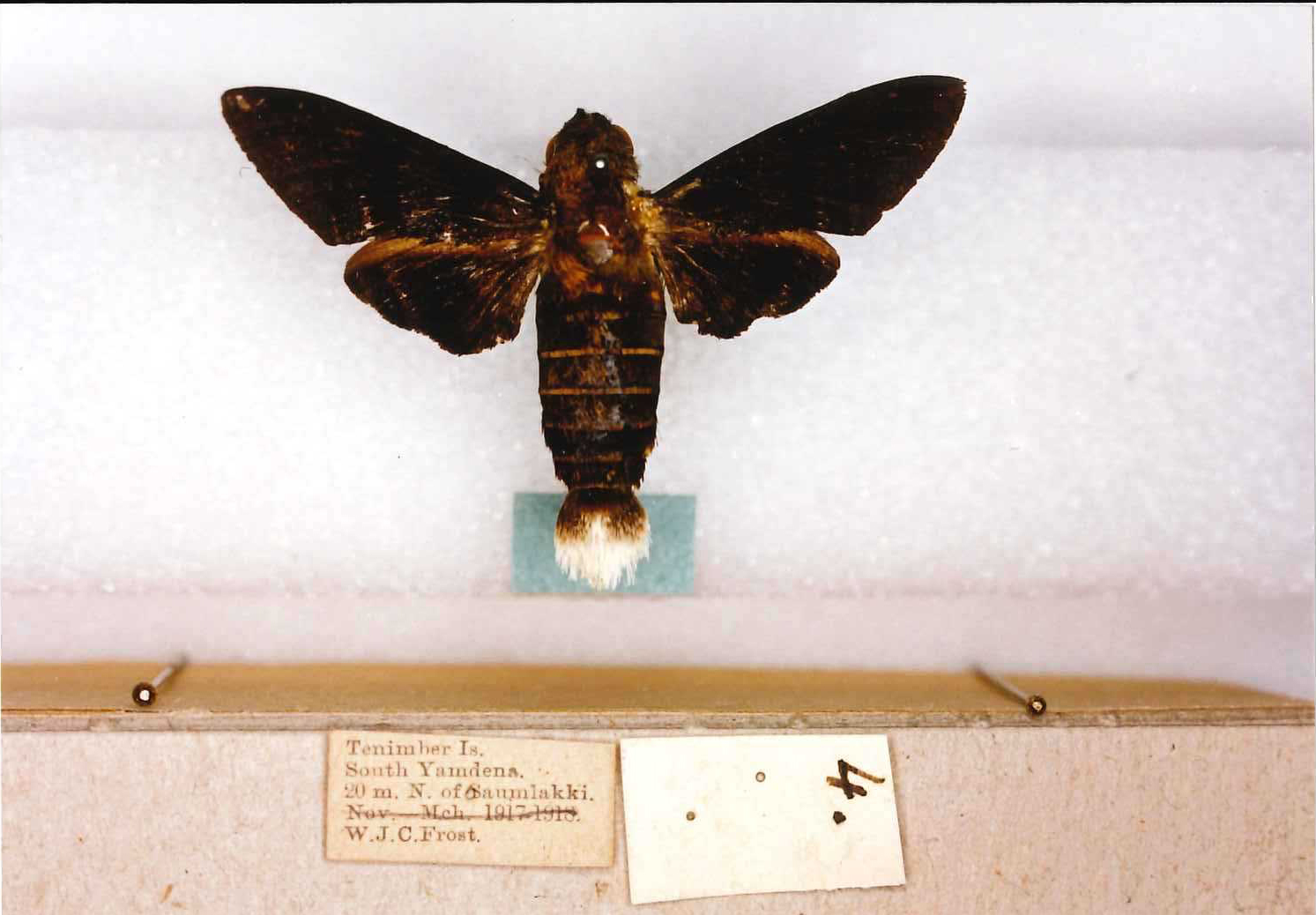

Scientific classification
- Kingdom: Animalia
- Phylum: Arthropoda
- Class: Insecta
- Order: Lepidoptera
- Family: Sphingidae
- Genus: Macroglossum
- Species: M. vadenberghi

Binomial name
- Macroglossum vadenberghi Hogenes, 1984

= Macroglossum vadenberghi =

Species of moth

Macroglossum vadenberghi is a moth of the family Sphingidae. It is known from Indonesia.
