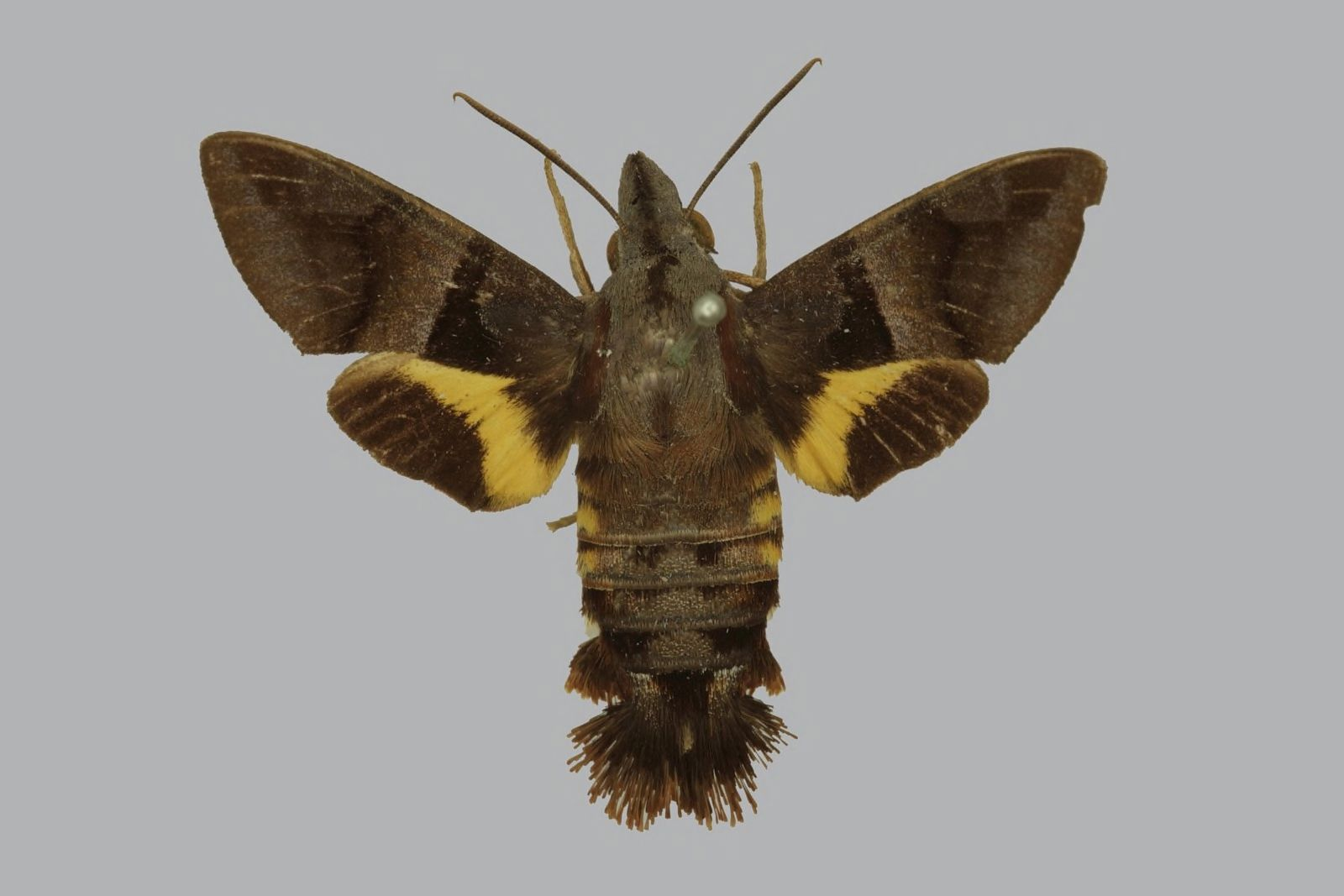

Scientific classification
- Kingdom: Animalia
- Phylum: Arthropoda
- Class: Insecta
- Order: Lepidoptera
- Family: Sphingidae
- Genus: Macroglossum
- Species: M. amoenum

Binomial name
- Macroglossum amoenum Rothschild & Jordan, 1916

= Macroglossum amoenum =

Species of moth

Macroglossum amoenum is a moth of the family Sphingidae. It is known from South-East Asia, including Indonesia and Malaysia.
