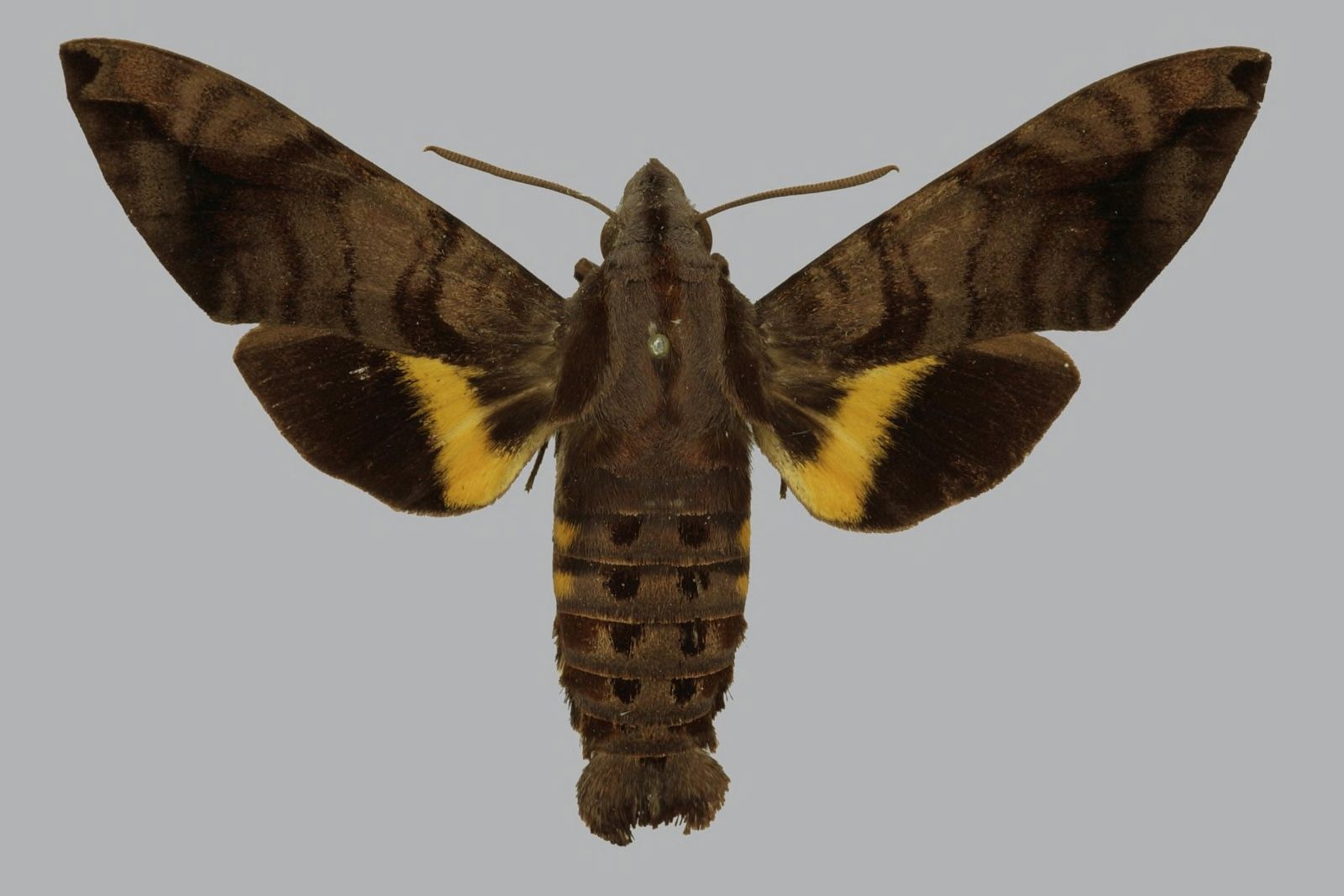

Scientific classification
- Kingdom: Animalia
- Phylum: Arthropoda
- Class: Insecta
- Order: Lepidoptera
- Family: Sphingidae
- Genus: Macroglossum
- Species: M. spilonotum

Binomial name
- Macroglossum spilonotum Rothschild & Jordan, 1912

= Macroglossum spilonotum =

Species of moth

Macroglossum spilonotum is a moth of the family Sphingidae. It is known from Papua New Guinea.
