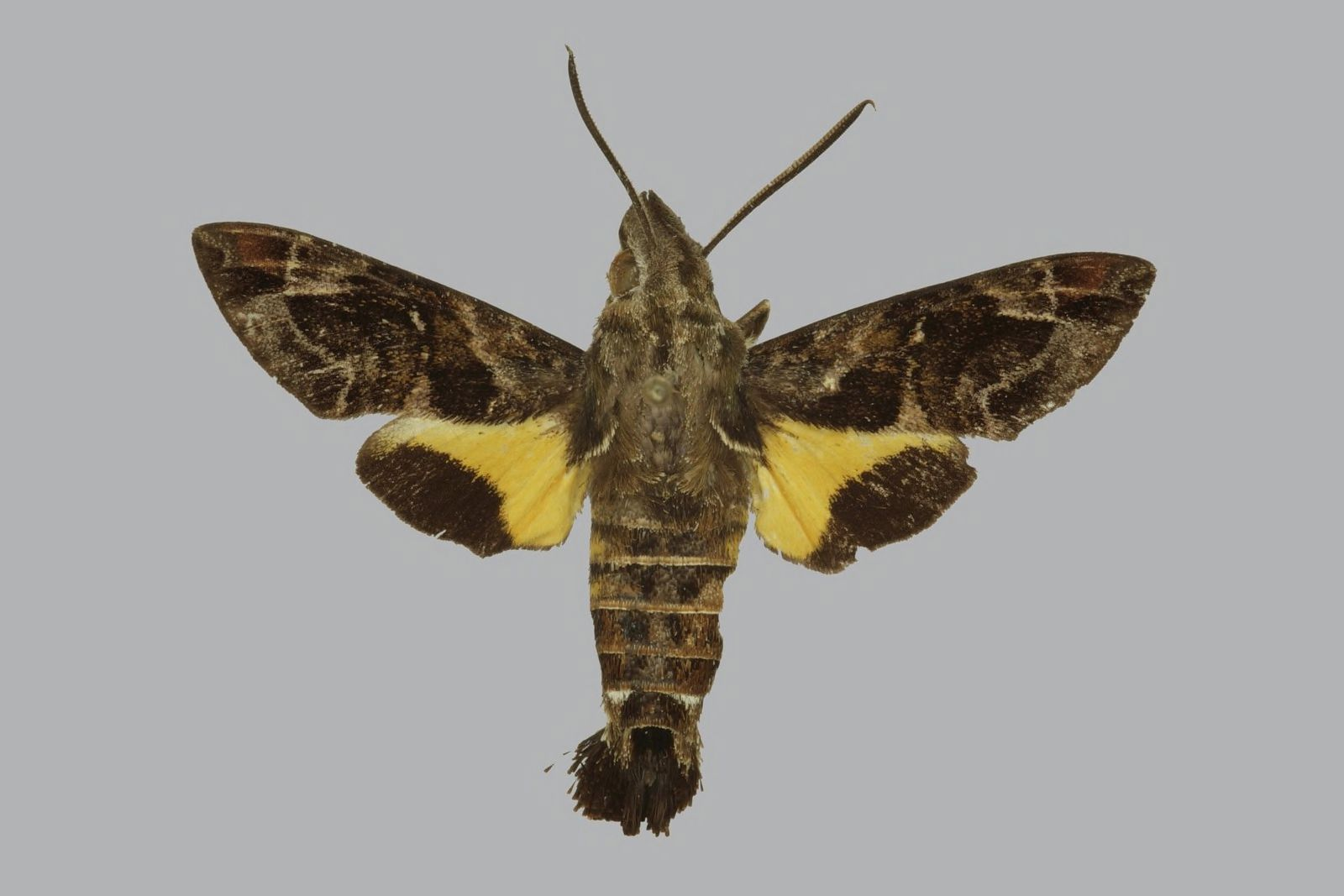

Scientific classification
- Kingdom: Animalia
- Phylum: Arthropoda
- Class: Insecta
- Order: Lepidoptera
- Family: Sphingidae
- Genus: Macroglossum
- Species: M. lepidum

Binomial name
- Macroglossum lepidum Rothschild & Jordan, 1915

= Macroglossum lepidum =

Species of moth

Macroglossum lepidum is a moth of the family Sphingidae. It is known from Malaysia and the Philippines.
