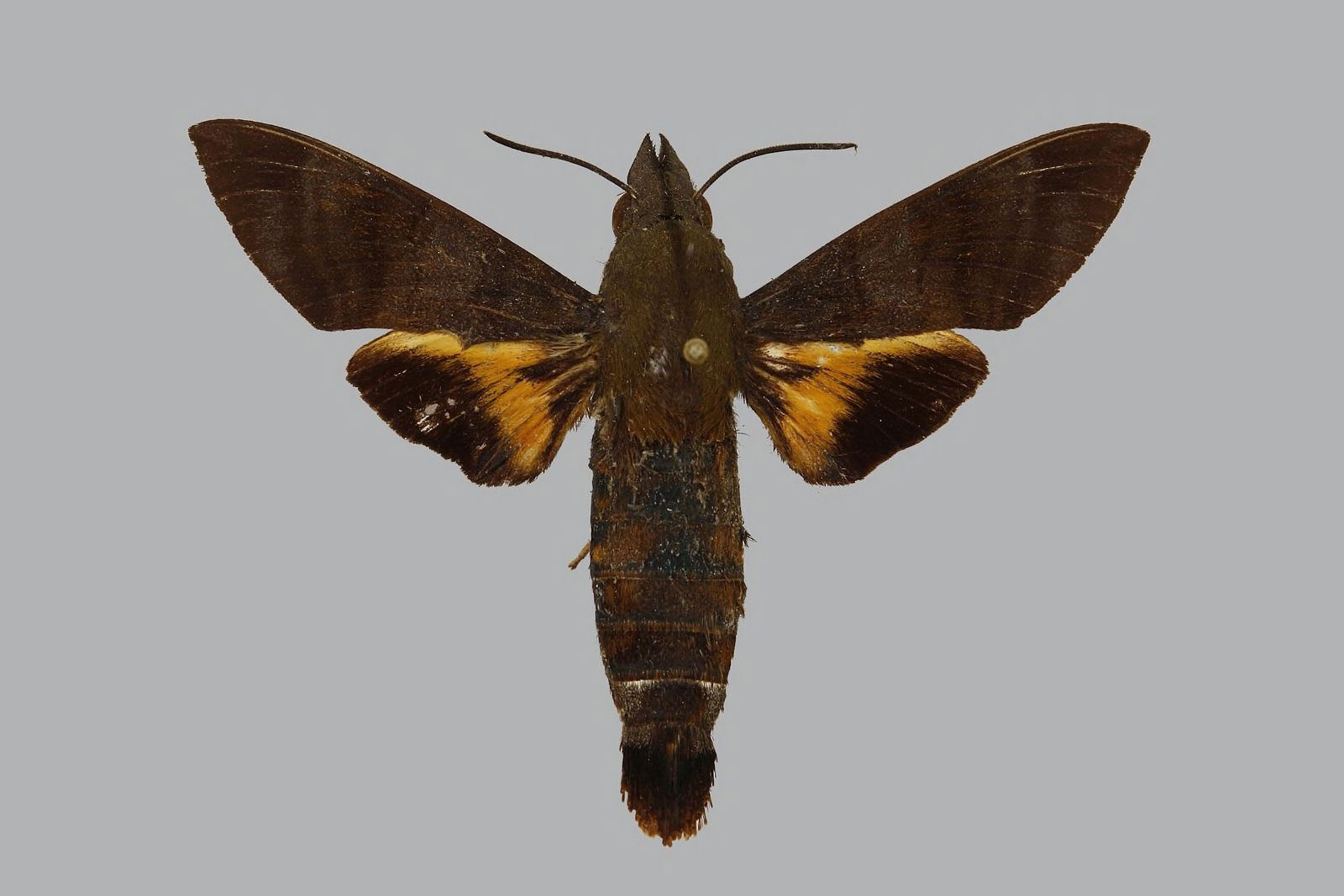

Scientific classification
- Kingdom: Animalia
- Phylum: Arthropoda
- Class: Insecta
- Order: Lepidoptera
- Family: Sphingidae
- Genus: Macroglossum
- Species: M. haxairei

Binomial name
- Macroglossum haxairei Eitschberger, 2003

= Macroglossum haxairei =

Species of moth

Macroglossum haxairei is a moth of the family Sphingidae. It is known from Sulawesi.
