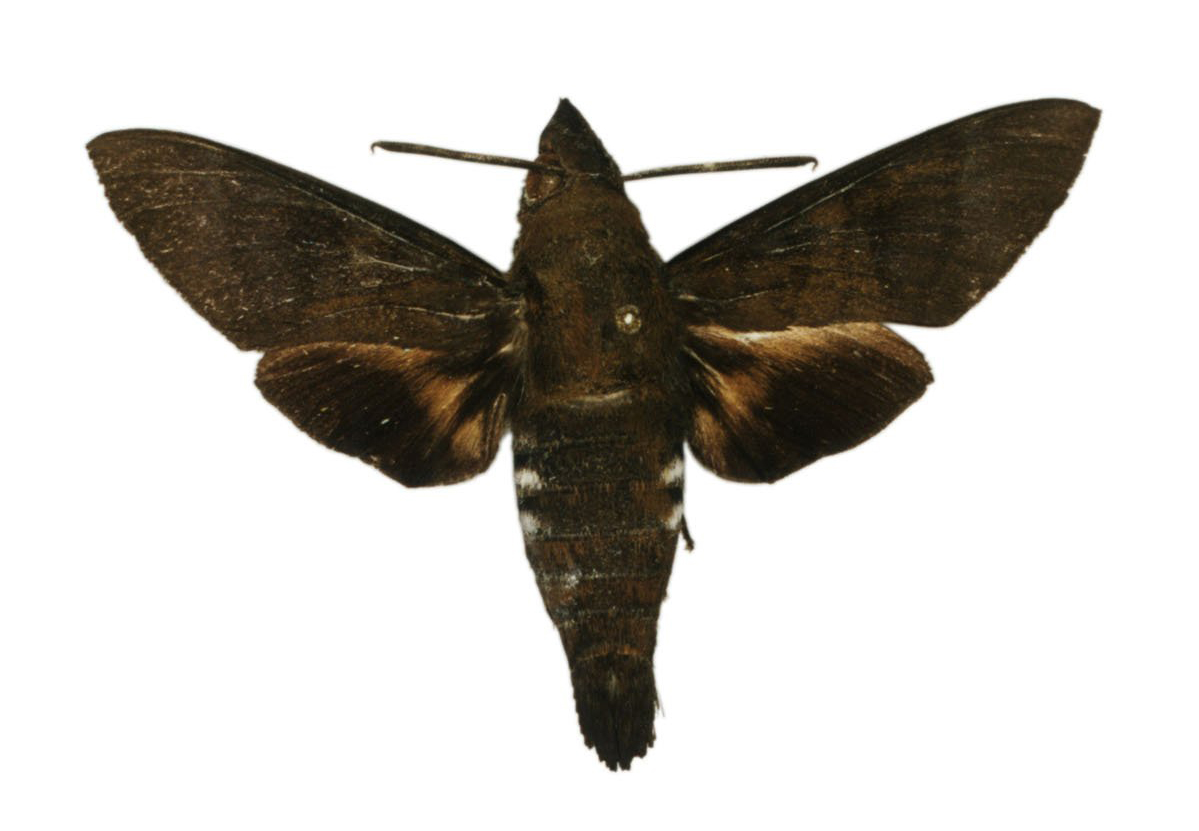

Scientific classification
- Kingdom: Animalia
- Phylum: Arthropoda
- Clade: Pancrustacea
- Class: Insecta
- Order: Lepidoptera
- Family: Sphingidae
- Genus: Macroglossum
- Species: M. melanoleuca

Binomial name
- Macroglossum melanoleuca Cadiou & Schnitzler, 2001

= Macroglossum melanoleuca =

Species of moth

Macroglossum melanoleuca is a moth of the family Sphingidae. It is known from Sumba in Indonesia.
