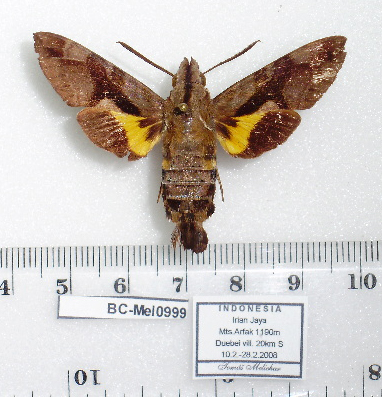

Scientific classification
- Kingdom: Animalia
- Phylum: Arthropoda
- Class: Insecta
- Order: Lepidoptera
- Family: Sphingidae
- Genus: Macroglossum
- Species: M. moecki

Binomial name
- Macroglossum moecki Rütimeyer, 1969

= Macroglossum moecki =

Species of moth

Macroglossum moecki is a moth of the family Sphingidae. It is found in New Guinea.
