= Macroglossum pseudoluteata =

Scientific classification
- Kingdom: Animalia
- Phylum: Arthropoda
- Class: Insecta
- Order: Lepidoptera
- Family: Sphingidae
- Genus: Macroglossum
- Species: M. pseudoluteata

Binomial name
- Macroglossum pseudoluteata Eitschberger, 2003

Synonyms
- Macroglossum pseudoluteata reducta Eitschberger, 2003

Species of moth

Macroglossum pseudoluteata is a moth of the family Sphingidae. It is known from Sulawesi.
