= Macroglossum pseudonigellum =

Scientific classification
- Kingdom: Animalia
- Phylum: Arthropoda
- Class: Insecta
- Order: Lepidoptera
- Family: Sphingidae
- Genus: Macroglossum
- Species: M. pseudonigellum

Binomial name
- Macroglossum pseudonigellum Eitschberger, 2006

Species of moth

Macroglossum pseudonigellum is a moth of the family Sphingidae which is endemic to Sulawesi.
