= Macroglossum palawana =

Scientific classification
- Kingdom: Animalia
- Phylum: Arthropoda
- Class: Insecta
- Order: Lepidoptera
- Family: Sphingidae
- Genus: Macroglossum
- Species: M. palawana

Binomial name
- Macroglossum palawana Eitschberger & Treadaway, 2004

Species of moth

Macroglossum palawana is a moth of the family Sphingidae. It is known from the Philippines (Palawan).
