= Macroglossum leytensis =

Scientific classification
- Kingdom: Animalia
- Phylum: Arthropoda
- Class: Insecta
- Order: Lepidoptera
- Family: Sphingidae
- Genus: Macroglossum
- Species: M. leytensis

Binomial name
- Macroglossum leytensis Eitschberger, 2006

Species of moth

Macroglossum leytensis is a moth of the family Sphingidae which is known from the Philippines (Leyte).
