= Macroglossum napolovi =

Scientific classification
- Kingdom: Animalia
- Phylum: Arthropoda
- Class: Insecta
- Order: Lepidoptera
- Family: Sphingidae
- Genus: Macroglossum
- Species: M. napolovi

Binomial name
- Macroglossum napolovi Eitschberger, 2004

Species of moth

Macroglossum napolovi is a moth of the family Sphingidae which is endemic to northern Vietnam.
