= Macroglossum fischeri =

Scientific classification
- Kingdom: Animalia
- Phylum: Arthropoda
- Class: Insecta
- Order: Lepidoptera
- Family: Sphingidae
- Genus: Macroglossum
- Species: M. fischeri

Binomial name
- Macroglossum fischeri Eitschberger, 2009

Species of moth

Macroglossum fischeri is a moth of the family Sphingidae. It is known from Vietnam.
