= Macroglossum ronja =

Scientific classification
- Kingdom: Animalia
- Phylum: Arthropoda
- Class: Insecta
- Order: Lepidoptera
- Family: Sphingidae
- Genus: Macroglossum
- Species: M. ronja

Binomial name
- Macroglossum ronja Eitschberger, 2009

Species of moth

Macroglossum ronja is a moth of the family Sphingidae. It is known from Sulawesi.
