= List of moths of Nepal (Sphingidae) =

The following is a list of Sphingidae of Nepal. One-hundred and twenty-nine different species are listed.

This list is primarily based on Colin Smith's 2010 Lepidoptera of Nepal, which is based on Toshiro Haruta's Moths of Nepal (Vols. 1-6) with some recent additions and a modernized classification.

== Subfamily Sphinginae ==
- Agrius convolvuli - convolvulus hawkmoth
- Megacorma obliqua - black-belted hawkmoth
- Acherontia lachesis - greater death's head hawkmoth
- Acherontia styx - lesser death's head hawkmoth
- Meganoton analis - grey double-bristled hawkmoth
- Meganoton rufescens rufescens - rosy double-bristled hawkmoth
- Psilogramma increta - plain grey hawkmoth
- Psilogramma menephron - large brown hawkmoth
- Apocalypsis velox - bald hawkmoth
- Pentateucha curiosa - hirsute hawkmoth
- Pseudodolbina fo fo - acanthus hawkmoth
- Thamnoecha uniformis - chir-pine hawkmoth
- Dolbina inexacta - common grizzled hawkmoth

== Subfamily Smerinthinae ==
- Amplypterus mansoni - Manson's mango hawkmoth
- Amplypterus panopus - mango hawkmoth
- Ambulyx liturata liturata - violet gliding hawkmoth
- Ambulyx maculifera - spotted gliding hawkmoth
- Ambulyx ochracea - ochreous gliding hawkmoth
- Ambulyx placida - plain gliding hawkmoth
- Ambulyx sericeipennis agana - common gliding hawkmoth
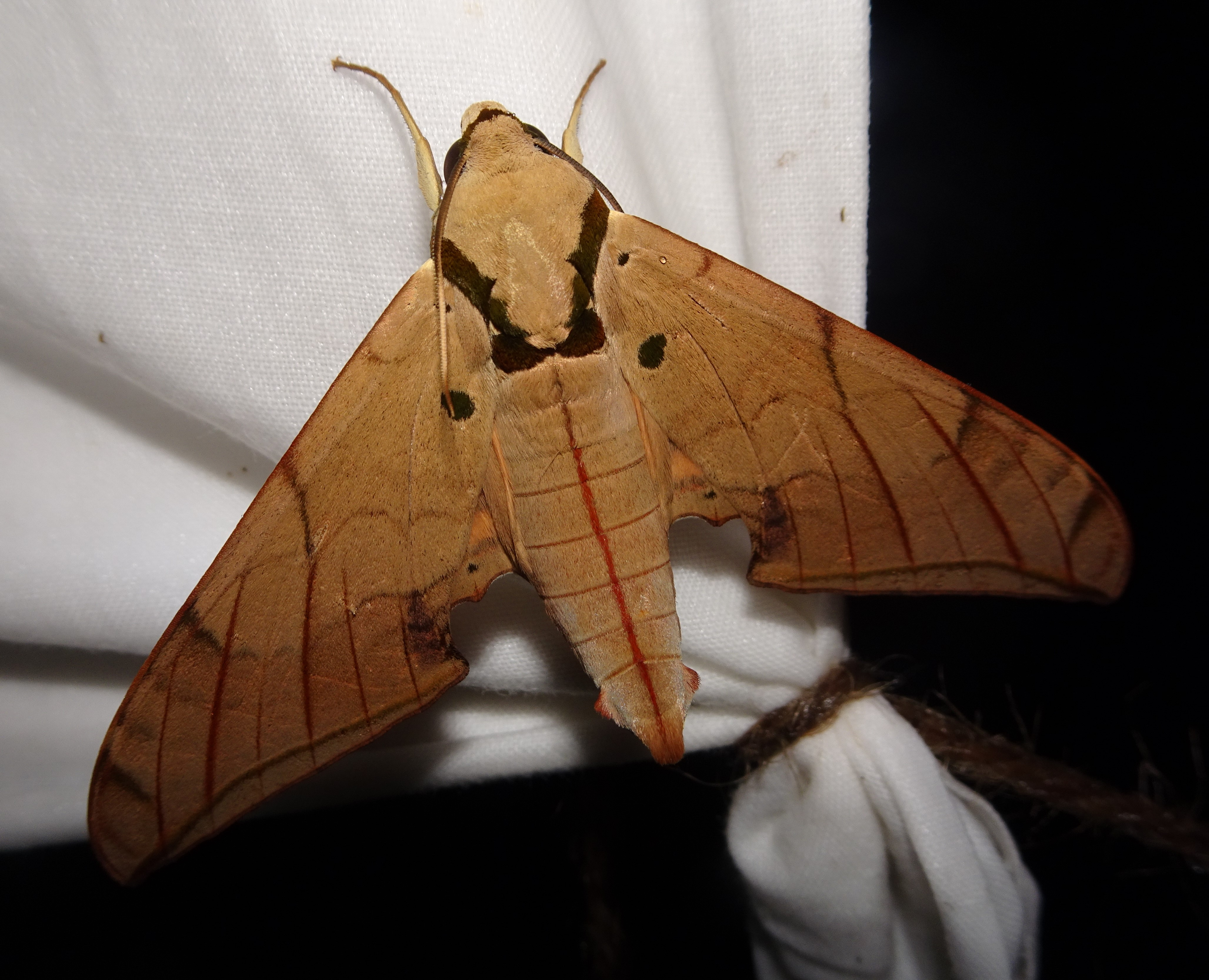
  Ambulyx sericeipennis (common gliding hawkmoth) in Tanahun, Raipur
- Ambulyx moorei - cinnamon gliding hawkmoth
- Ambulyx substrigilis substrigilis - dark-based gliding hawkmoth
- Clanis bilineata - two-lined velvet hawkmoth
- Clanis deucalion - three-lined velvet hawkmoth
- Clanis phalaris - common velvet hawkmoth
- Clanis titan - scarce velvet hawkmoth
- Clanis undulosa gigantia - wavy velvet hawkmoth
- Leucophlebia lineata - large candy-striped hawkmoth
- Polyptychus dentatus - straight-lined crenulate hawkmoth
- Polyptychus trilineatus undatus - common crenulate hawkmoth
- Marumba cristata - common swirled hawkmoth
- Marumba dyras - dull swirled hawkmoth
- Marumba gaschkewitschii irata
- Marumba indicus - lesser swirled hawkmoth
- Marumba spectabilis - rosy swirled hawkmoth
- Marumba sperchius albicans - large swirled hawkmoth
- Marumba sperchius gigas - large swirled hawkmoth
- Morwennius decoratus - ornamented hawkmoth
- Langia zenzeroides zenzeroides - apple hawkmoth
- Rhodoprasina floralis - large olive hawkmoth
- Clanidopsis exusta - white streaked hawkmoth
- Craspedortha porphyria - purple hawkmoth
- Cypa decolor - common cypa
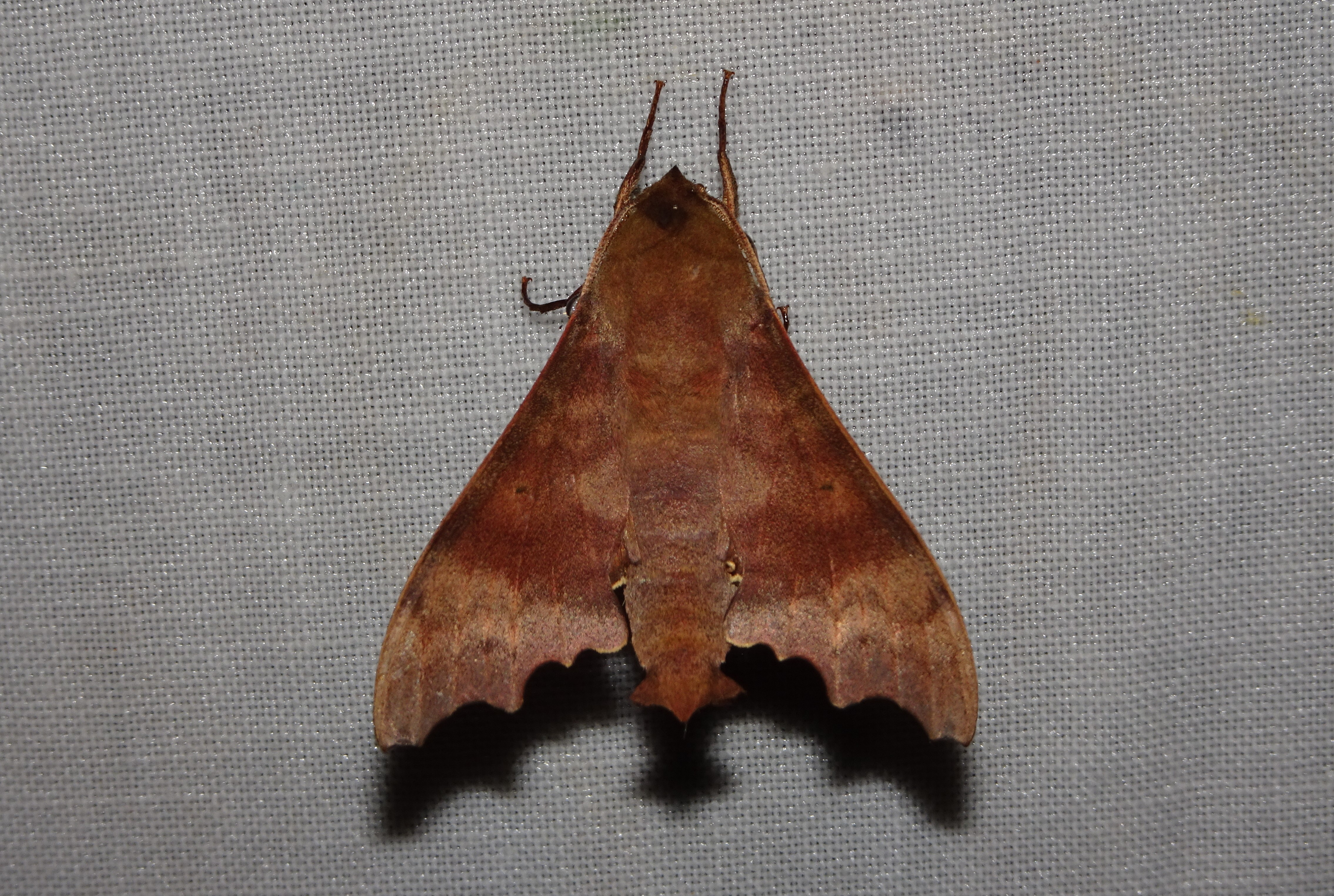
  Cypa decolor (common cypa) in Pokhara, Sarangkot
- Cypa uniformis - pale cypa
- Smerinthulus perversa - lichenous hawkmoth
- Degmaptera mirabilis - variegated hawkmoth
- Callambulyx poecilus - lesser pink-and-green hawkmoth
- Callambulyx rubricosa - large pink-and-green hawkmoth
- Anambulyx elwesi - Elwes' pink-and-green hawkmoth
- Phyllospingia dissimilis perundulans - brown-leaf hawkmoth
- Sataspes infernalis - dull carpenter-bee hawkmoth

== Subfamily Macroglossinae ==
- Cephonodes hylas - common bumble-bee hawkmoth / coffee bee hawkmoth
- Daphnis hypothous - jade hawkmoth
- Daphnis nerii - oleander hawkmoth
- Dahira rubiginosa - rosy dahira
- Ampelophaga dolichoides - green banded hawkmoth
- Ampelophaga khasiana khasiana - scarce vine hawkmoth
- Ampelophaga rubiginosa harterti - common vine hawkmoth
- Dahira obliquifascia - black-striped dahira
- Dahira yunnanfuana - white-spot dahira
- Dahira tridens - three-banded dahira
- Elibia dolichus - large banded hawkmoth
- Acosmeryx anceus subdentata - rosy forest hawkmoth
- Acosmeryx naga naga - common forest hawkmoth
- Acosmeryx omissa - obscure forest hawkmoth
- Acosmeryx pseudonaga - false common forest hawkmoth
- Acosmeryx sericeus - silky forest hawkmoth
- Acosmeryx shervillii - dull forest hawkmoth
- Eupanacra busiris - green rippled hawkmoth
- Eupanacra metallica - metallic rippled hawkmoth
- Eupanacra mydon - common rippled hawkmoth / alocasia hawkmoth
- Eupanacra perfecta - model rippled hawkmoth
- Eupanacra sinuata - sinuous rippled hawkmoth
- Eupanacra variolosa - brown rippled hawkmoth
- Angonyx testacea - northern dark-green hawkmoth
- Enpinanga assamensis - lesser dimorphic hawkmoth / assam hawkmoth
- Nephele didyma f. didyma
- Nephele hespera - crepuscular hawkmoth
- Neogurelca himachala - crisp-banded hawkmoth
- Neogurelca hyas - even-banded hawkmoth
- Gurelca masuriensis - diffuse-banded hawkmoth
- Sphingonaepiopsis pumilio - tiny hawkmoth
- Eurypteryx bhaga bhaga - hook-winged hawkmoth
- Hayesiana triopus - nonsuch hawkmoth
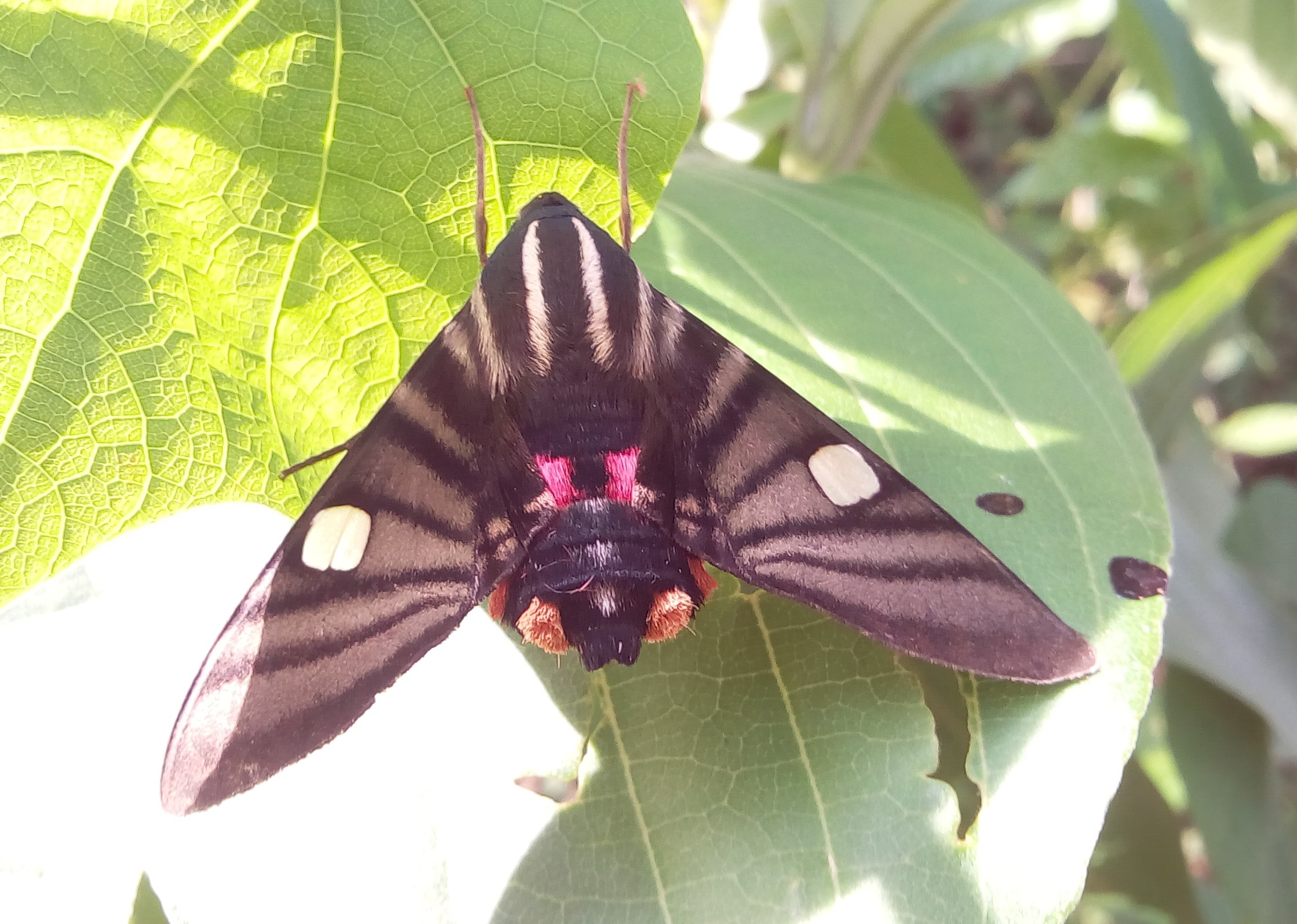
  Hayesiana triopus (nonsuch hawkmoth) in Lamjung, Sundarbazar
- Macroglossum belis - common hummingbird hawkmoth
- Macroglossum bombylans - humble bee hawkmoth
- Macroglossum corythus luteata - Walker's hummingbird hawkmoth
- Macroglossum fritzei
- Macroglossum insipida - hermit hummingbird hawkmoth
- Macroglossum gyrans - striated hummingbird hawkmoth
- Macroglossum pyrrhosticta - burnt-spot hummingbird hawkmoth
- Macroglossum saga - grey-tipped hummingbird hawkmoth
- Macroglossum variegatum - variegated hummingbird hawkmoth
- Rhopalopsyche nycteris - Himalayan hummingbird hawkmoth
- Hyles galii nepalensis - bedstraw hawkmoth
- Hyles livornica - striped hawkmoth
- Deilephila elpenor macromera - large elephant hawkmoth
- Deilephila rivularis - obscure elephant hawkmoth
- Hippotion boerhaviae - pale striated hawkmoth
- Hippotion celerio - common striated hawkmoth / silver-striped hawkmoth
- Hippotion rafflesi - Raffles' striated hawkmoth
- Hippotion rosetta - Swinhoe's striated hawkmoth
- Hippotion velox - dark striated hawkmoth
- Theretra alecto - Levant hunter hawkmoth
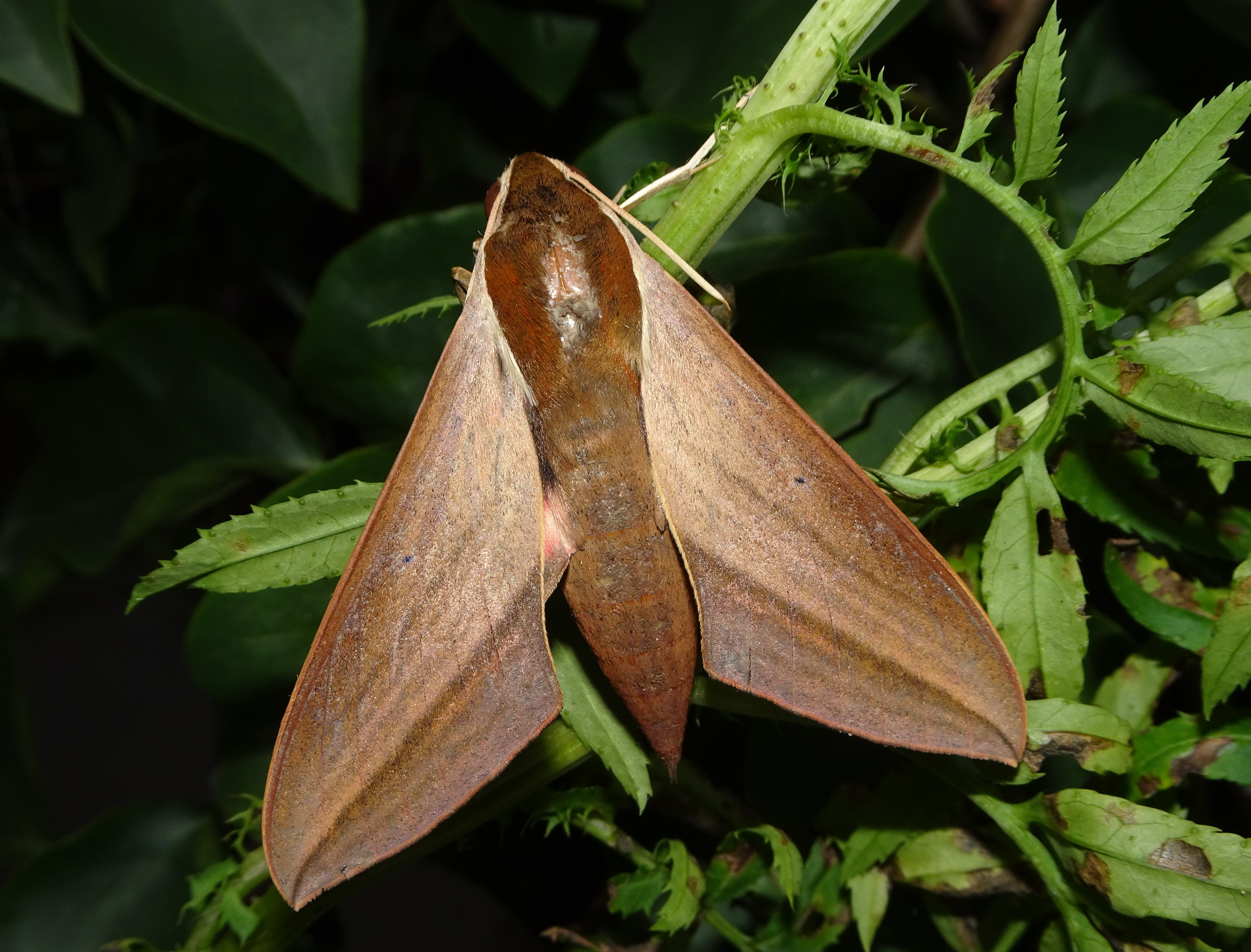
  Theretra alecto (levant hunter hawkmoth) in Lamjung, Bhorletar
- Theretra boisduvalii
- Theretra clotho - common hunter hawkmoth
- Theretra griseomarginata - grey-edged hunter hawkmoth
- Theretra latreillii lucasii - Latreille's hunter hawkmoth
- Theretra lycetus - grey-banded hunter hawkmoth
- Theretra nessus - orange-sided hunter hawkmoth / yam hawkmoth
- Theretra oldenlandiae - white-banded hunter hawkmoth
- Theretra pallicosta - white-edged hunter hawkmoth
- Theretra silhetensis - brown-banded hunter hawkmoth
- Theretra suffusa - suffused hunter hawkmoth
- Pergesa acteus - green pergesa hawkmoth
- Rhagastis albomarginatus - pale-edged mottled hawkmoth
- Rhagastis castor aurifera - common mottled hawkmoth
- Rhagastis confusa confusa - indistinct mottled hawkmoth
- Rhagastis gloriosa - crimson mottled hawkmoth
- Rhagastis hayesi
- Rhagastis lunata - lunulate mottled hawkmoth
- Rhagastis olivacea - olive mottled hawkmoth
- Rhagastis velata - veiled mottled hawkmoth
- Cechenena aegrota - mottled green hawkmoth
- Cechenena helops - spotted green hawkmoth
- Cechenena lineosa - striped green hawkmoth
- Cechenena minor - lesser green hawkmoth
- Cechenena mirabilis - emerald green hawkmoth
- Cechenena scotti - Scott's green hawkmoth
- Cechenena subangustata

== See also ==
- List of butterflies of Nepal
- Odonata of Nepal
- Cerambycidae of Nepal
- Zygaenidae of Nepal
- Wildlife of Nepal
