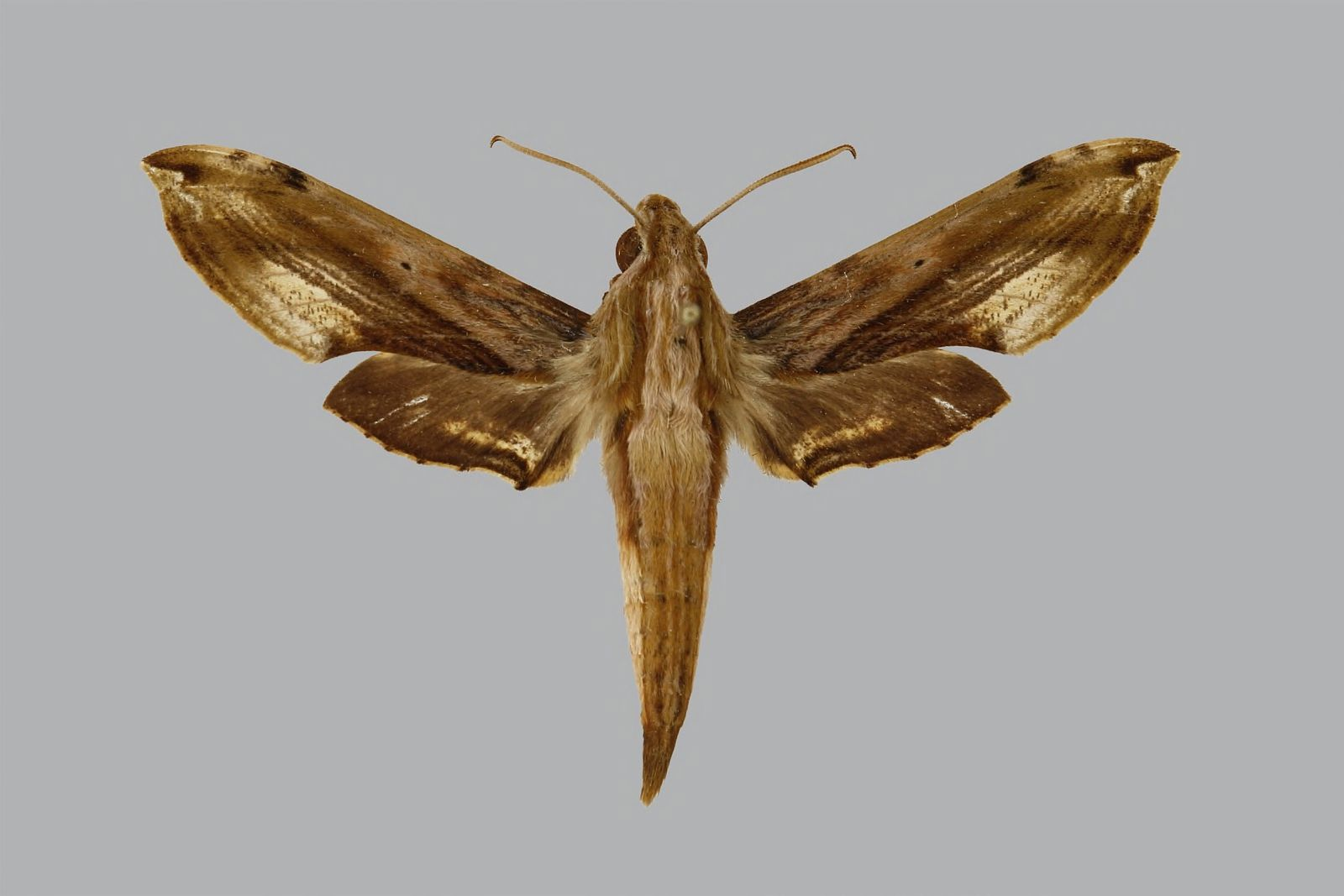

Scientific classification
- Kingdom: Animalia
- Phylum: Arthropoda
- Class: Insecta
- Order: Lepidoptera
- Family: Sphingidae
- Genus: Eupanacra
- Species: E. perfecta

Binomial name
- Eupanacra perfecta (Butler, 1875)

Synonyms
- Panacra perfecta Butler, 1875; Panacra perfecta tsekoui Clark, 1926

= Eupanacra perfecta =

Species of moth

Eupanacra perfecta is a moth of the family Sphingidae. It is known from north-eastern India, Bhutan, Myanmar, south-western China, northern Thailand and Vietnam.

The wingspan is 56–64 mm. It is similar in colour to Eupanacra metallica. The forewing outer margin is not or only very slightly excavate posterior to the apex. The forewing upperside has postmedian lines which are more longitudinal than in Eupanacra sinuata and run parallel to the outer margin. The first postmedian line is closer to the base on the inner margin. There is a distinct double submarginal line present parallel to the outer margin. The forewing underside is similar to Eupanacra metallica, but the postmedian line is more oblique and abbreviated. There is a pair of more distinct submarginal lines present, the space between them is whitish. The hindwing upperside has a pale median band which is slightly wider than in Eupanacra sinuata, nearly reaching the costa but obscured by brown scaling anteriorly. The third postmedian line on the hindwing underside is as heavy or heavier than the first and accentuated by vein dots.

== Subspecies ==
- Eupanacra perfecta perfecta (north-eastern India, Bhutan, Myanmar, south-western China, northern Thailand, Vietnam)
- Eupanacra perfecta tsekoui (Clark, 1926) (Yunnan in south-western China)
