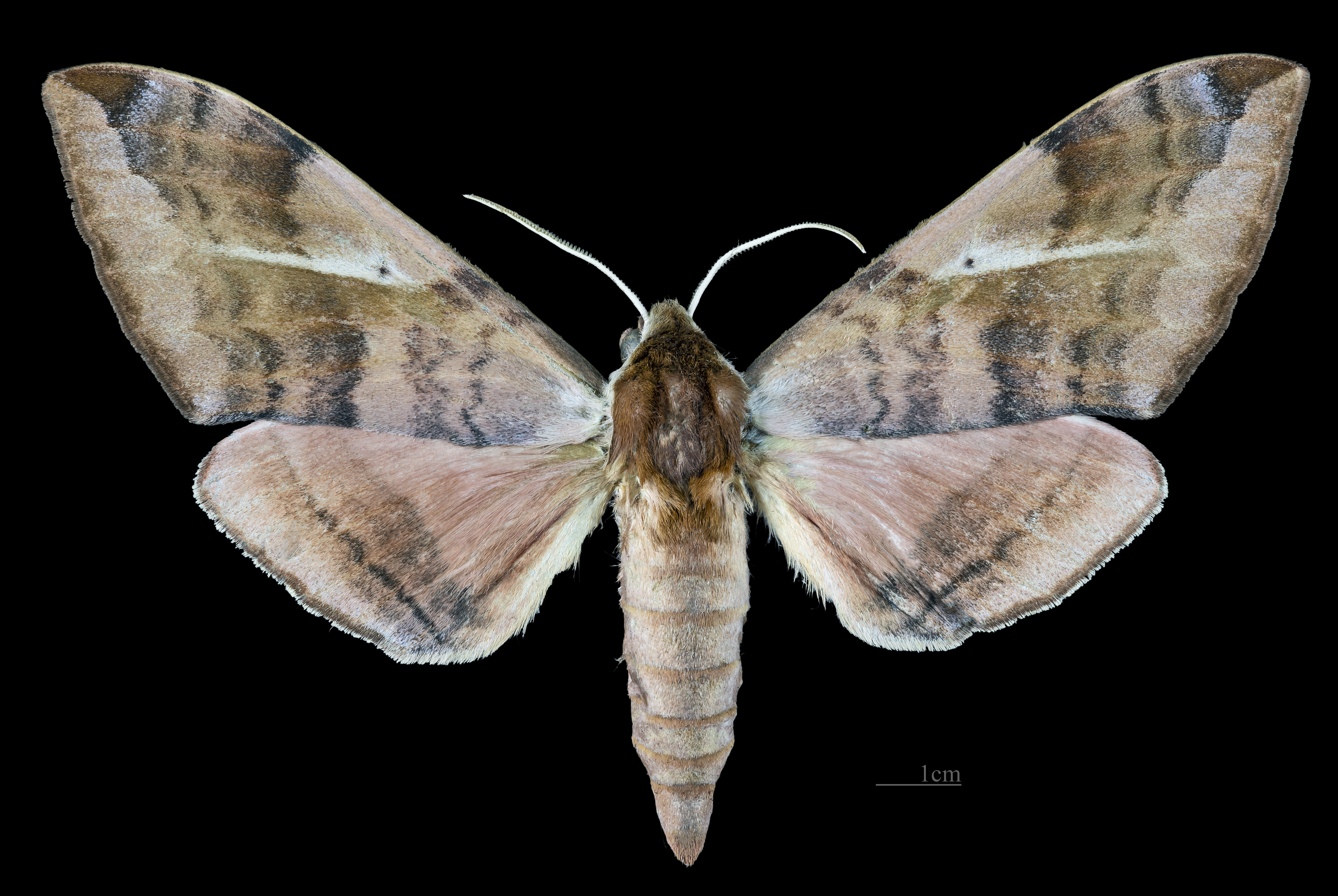
- Male upperside
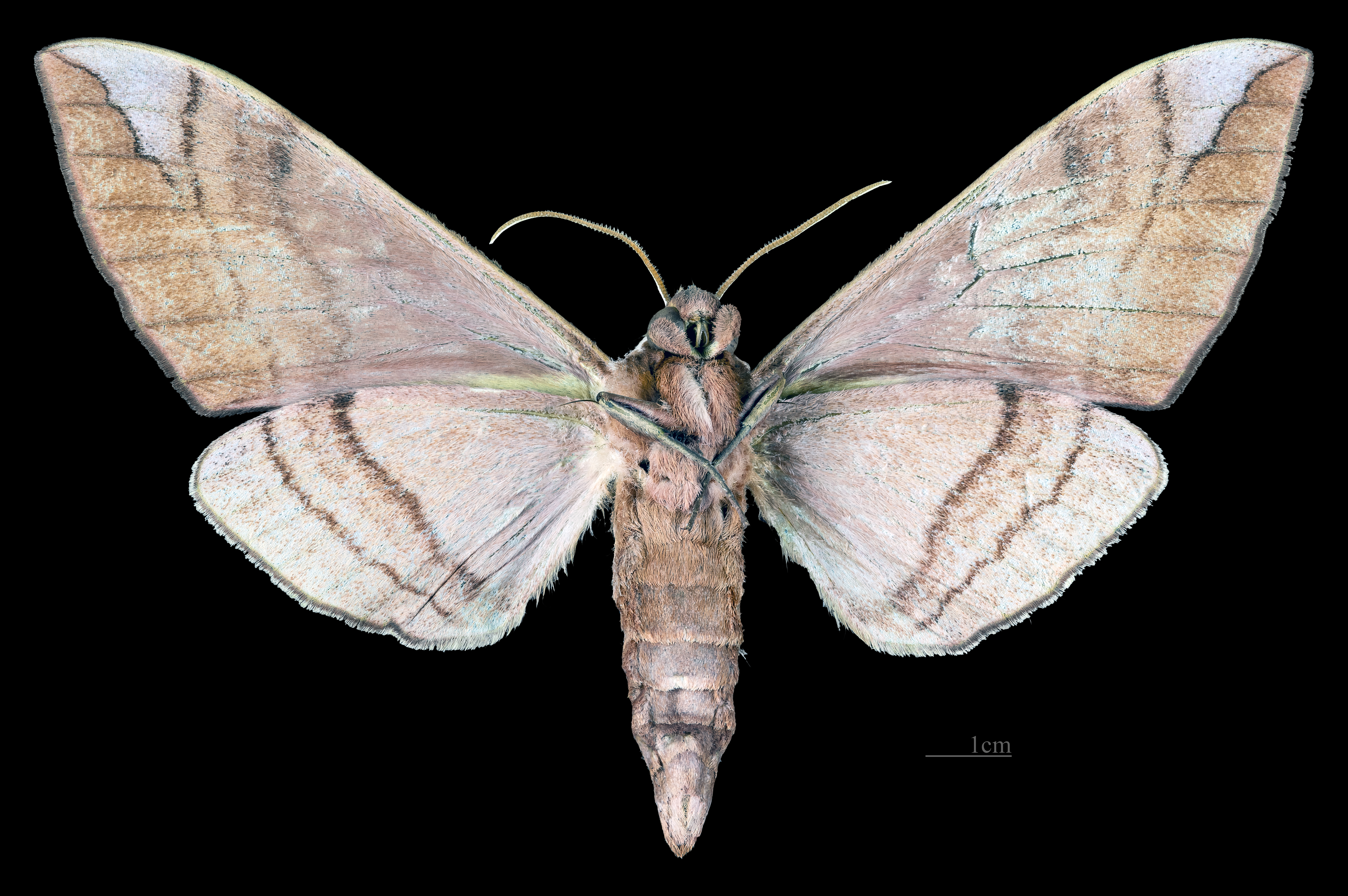
- Male underside

Scientific classification
- Domain: Eukaryota
- Kingdom: Animalia
- Phylum: Arthropoda
- Class: Insecta
- Order: Lepidoptera
- Family: Sphingidae
- Tribe: Smerinthini
- Genus: Clanidopsis; Rothschild & Jordan, 1903
- Species: C. exusta

Binomial name
- Clanidopsis exusta (Butler, 1875)

Synonyms
- Basiana exusta Butler, 1875

= Clanidopsis =

Genus of moths

Clanidopsis is a genus of moths in the family Sphingidae, containing only one species Clanidopsis exusta, the white-streaked hawkmoth. The genus was erected by Walter Rothschild and Karl Jordan in 1903 and the species was first described by Arthur Gardiner Butler in 1875.

== Distribution ==
Is found from northern Pakistan (Margalla Hills) and north-western India, eastward along the southern slopes of the Himalayas to central Nepal and neighbouring parts of Tibet and Hubei in China.

== Description ==
The wingspan is 70–96 mm. It is similar to Clanis species, but the proboscis is much shorter and the forewing is broader and not falcate apically. The forewing underside is lacking a black streak posterior to the discal cell and the hindwing upperside is lacking the black basal patch.

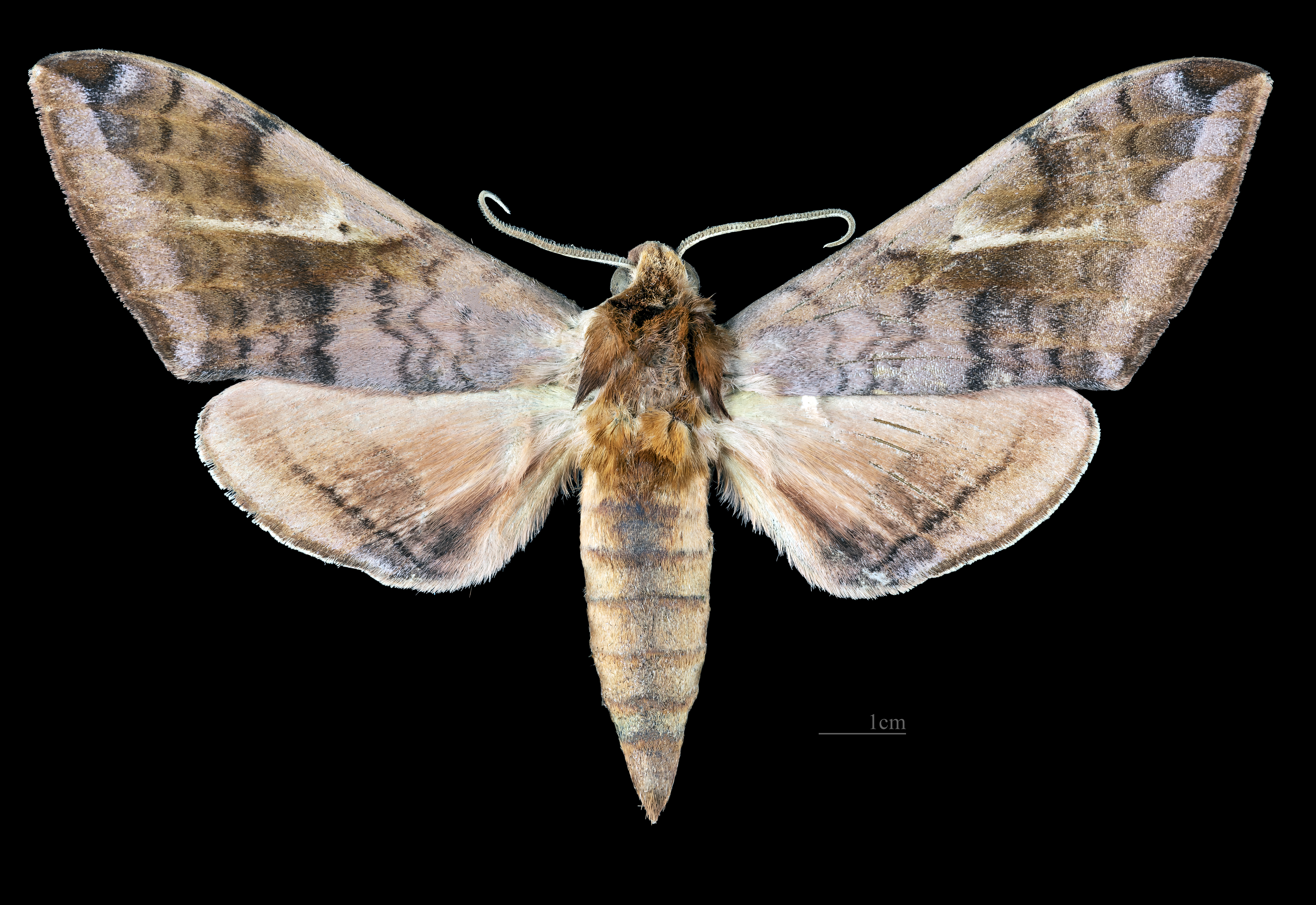
Upperside of male

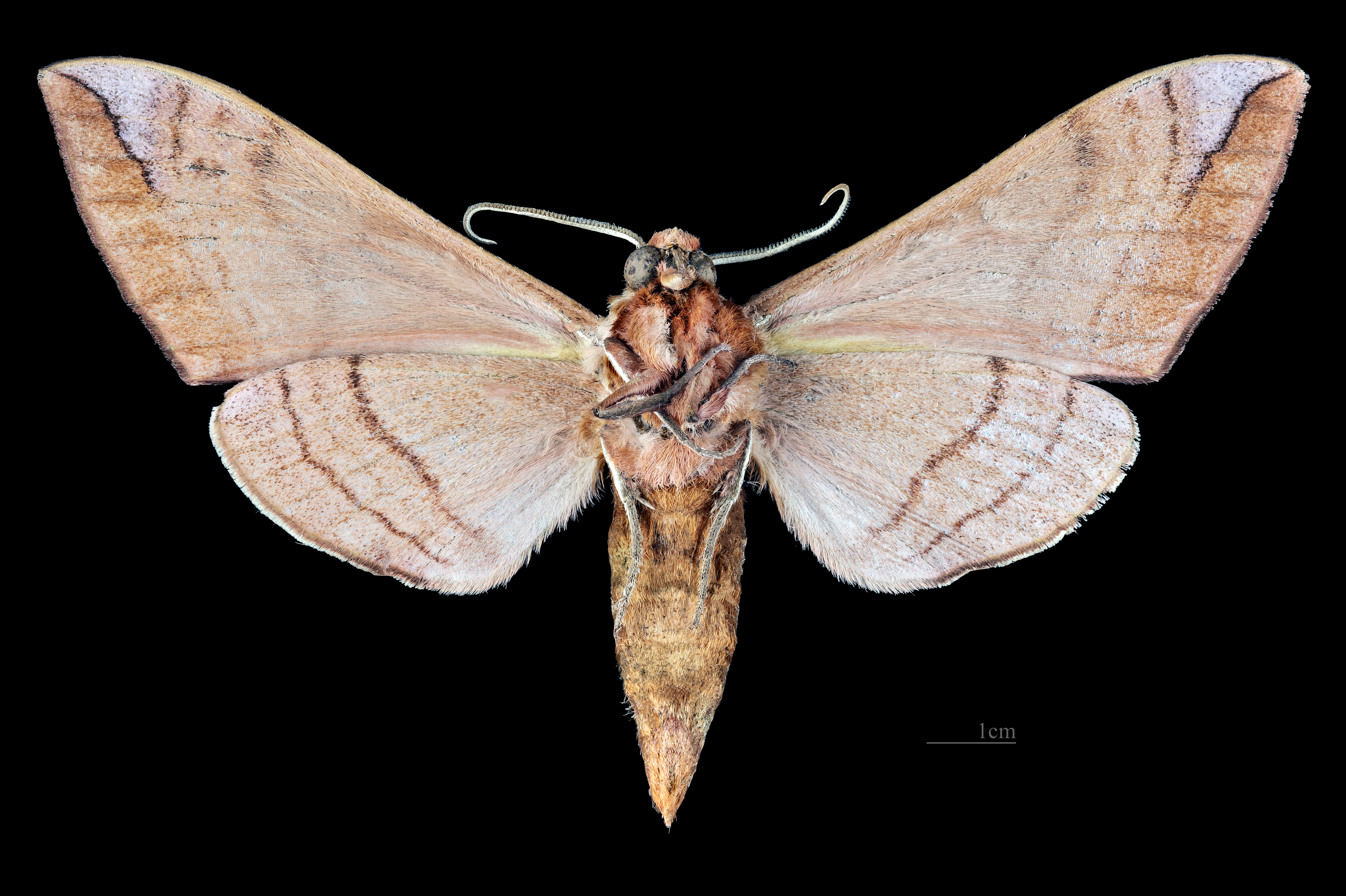
Underside of male

== Biology ==
The larvae have been recorded feeding on Indigofera species in India.
