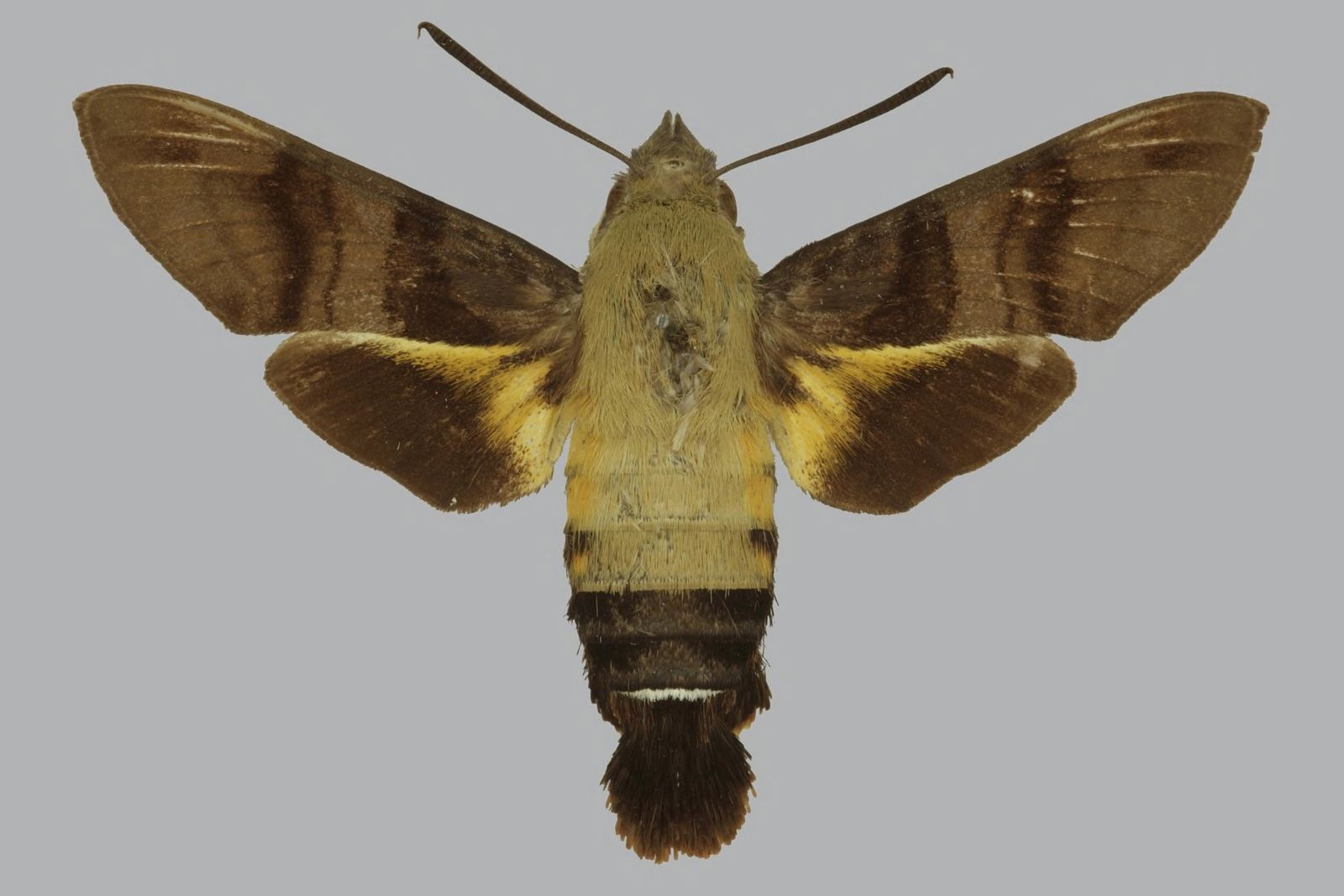
- Female

Scientific classification
- Kingdom: Animalia
- Phylum: Arthropoda
- Class: Insecta
- Order: Lepidoptera
- Family: Sphingidae
- Genus: Macroglossum
- Species: M. bombylans

Binomial name
- Macroglossum bombylans Boisduval, 1875

Synonyms
- Macroglossa tristis Schaufuss, 1870; Macroglossa walkeri Butler, 1875; Macroglossum bombylans angustifascia Bryk, 1944; Macroglossum bombylans monotona (Bryk, 1944)

= Macroglossum bombylans =

Species of moth

Macroglossum bombylans, the humble hummingbird hawkmoth, is a moth of the family Sphingidae. It is known from Nepal through China to Taiwan, Korea and Japan, with one record from the Russian Far East. It is also found in northern Thailand, northern Vietnam and the Philippines.

The wingspan is 40–52 mm. In northern China, there are two generations per year, with adults on wing from May to August. In Korea, adults have been recorded from mid-July to mid-October. Adults have been found feeding at flowers of Barleria cristata and Duranta erecta in Hong Kong, usually at dawn and late in the afternoon. Adults are also a minor fruit-piercing pest of Citrus junos in South Korea.

Larvae have been recorded feeding on Rubia cordifolia in India, Rubia akane in Japan and Paederia and Stauntonia species elsewhere.
