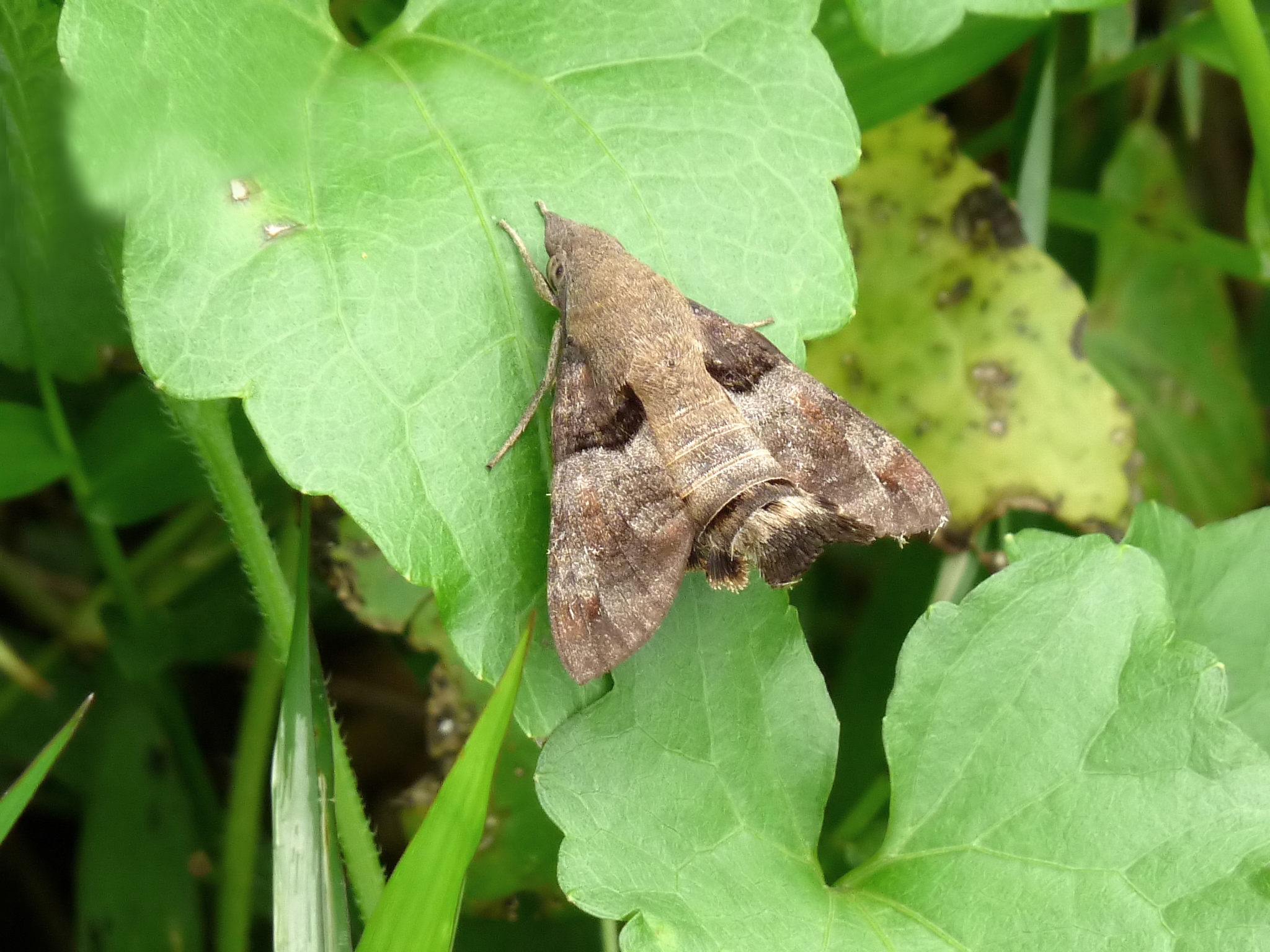
- In Kadavoor, Kerala, India

Scientific classification
- Kingdom: Animalia
- Phylum: Arthropoda
- Class: Insecta
- Order: Lepidoptera
- Family: Sphingidae
- Genus: Macroglossum
- Species: M. gyrans

Binomial name
- Macroglossum gyrans Walker, 1856

Synonyms
- Macroglossa zena Boisduval, 1875; Macroglossa burmanica Rothschild, 1894; Macroglossa bombus Mabille, 1879

= Macroglossum gyrans =

Species of moth

Macroglossum gyrans is a moth of the family Sphingidae. It was described by Francis Walker in 1856 and is known from South-east Asia and Madagascar.

== Description ==
The length of the forewings is 16–23 mm. The upperside of the head, thorax, and basal half of the abdomen are the same grey colour as the forewing upperside. The underside of the palpus, thorax, and legs are almost pure white. The sides of the thorax and legs are shaded or speckled with brown scales. The abdomen underside is grey brown. The forewing upperside is grey. Both wing undersides are dull ochraceous tawny, shaded with grey brown, the bases are more rusty brown. The hindwing upperside is not darker at the base than in the middle and is tawny-rust coloured, gradually becoming brown distally, but the brown border is not sharply defined and the lines are not prominent. The hindwing underside inner area is pale yellow at the base.

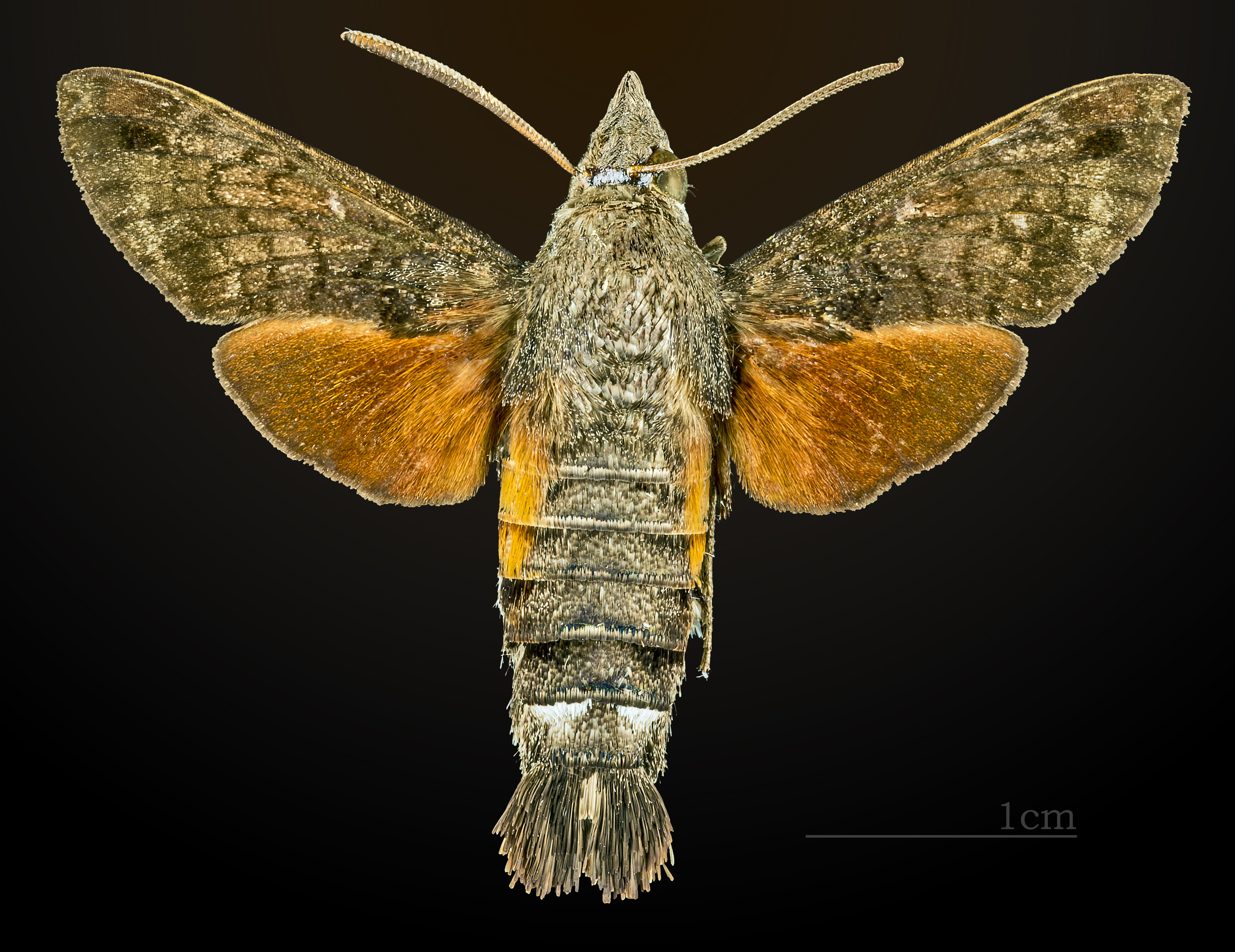
Dorsal view

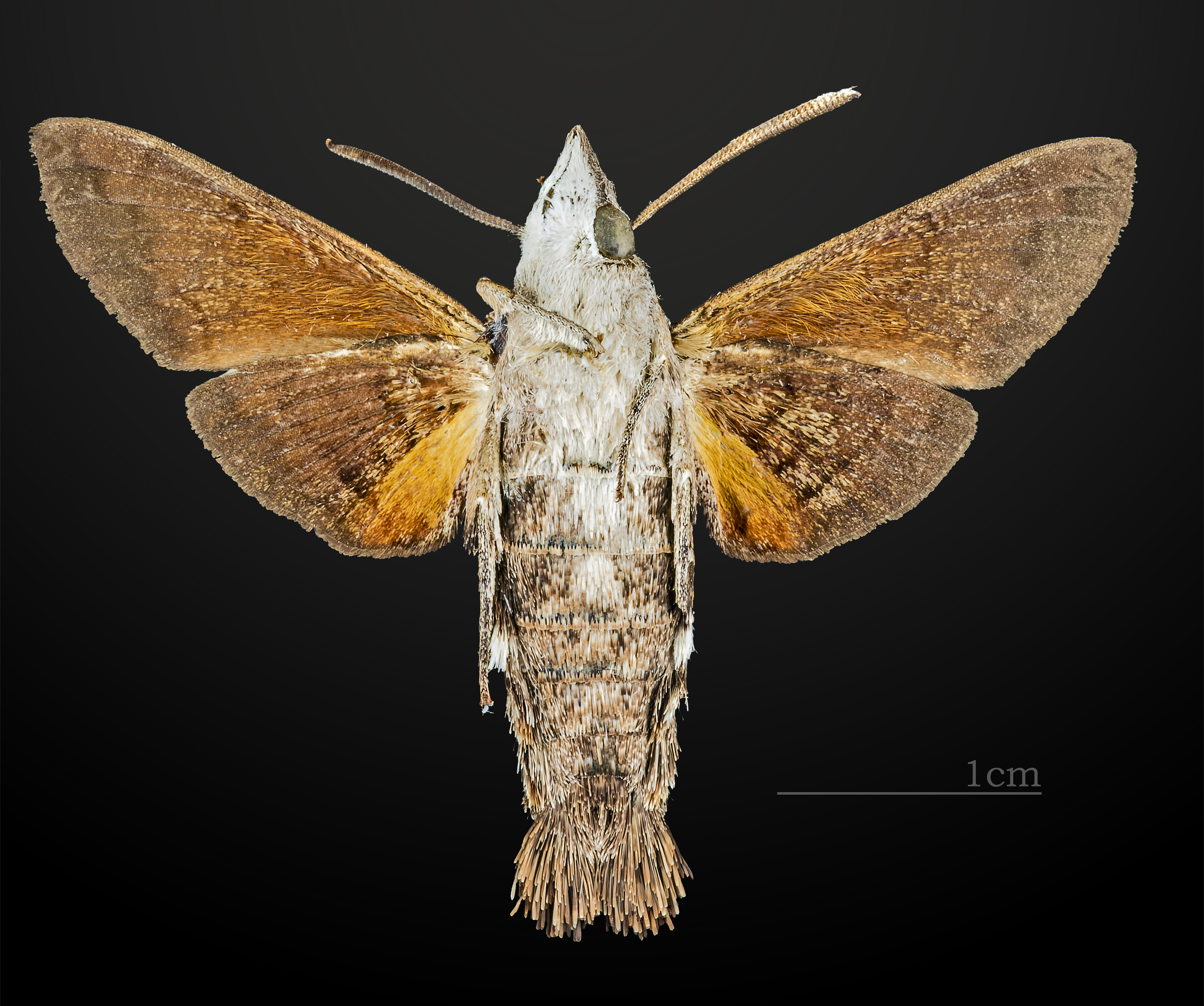
Ventral view

== Ecology ==
The caterpillar is found on Morinda and Strychnos.
