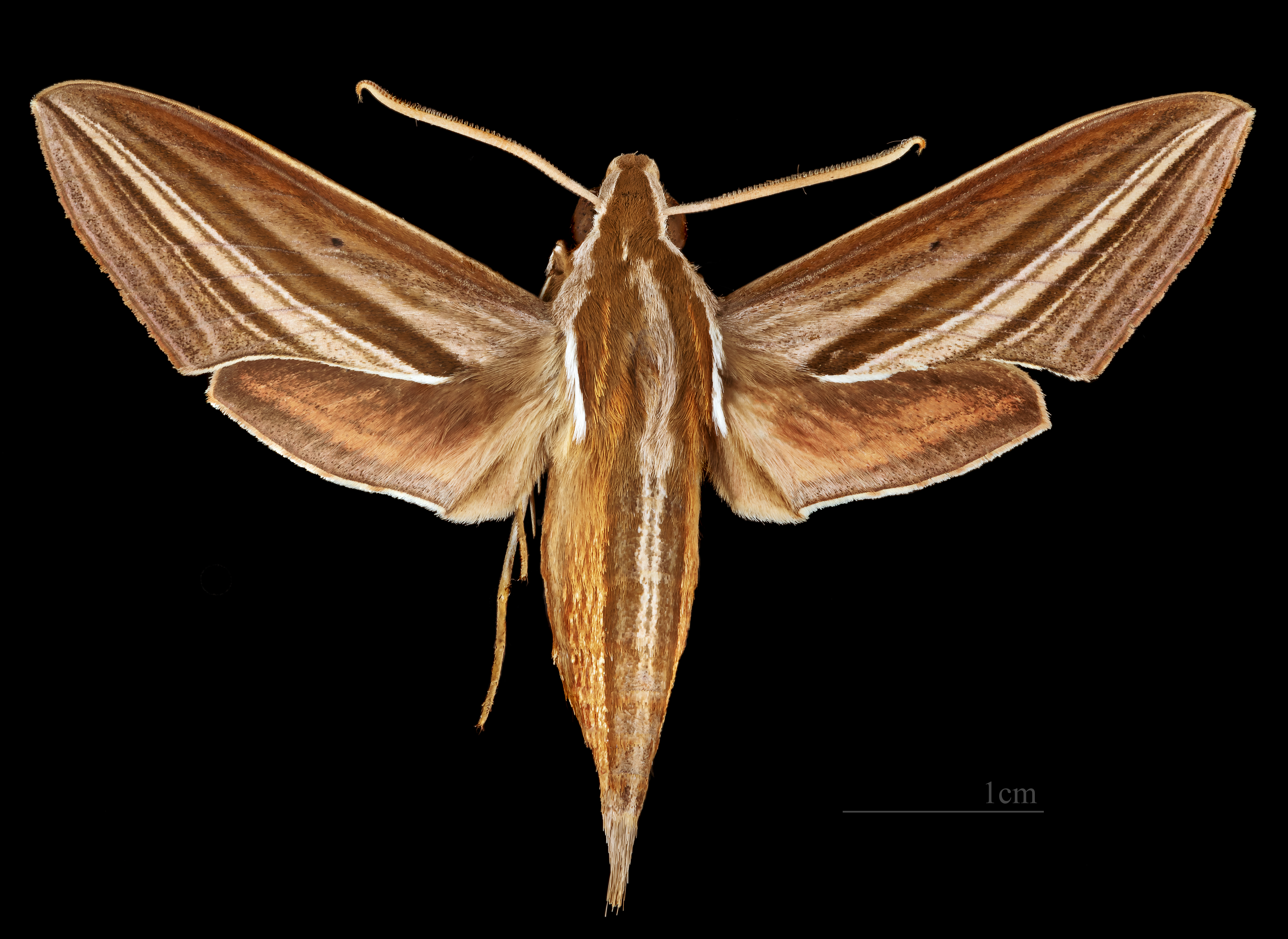
- Theretra lycetus ♂
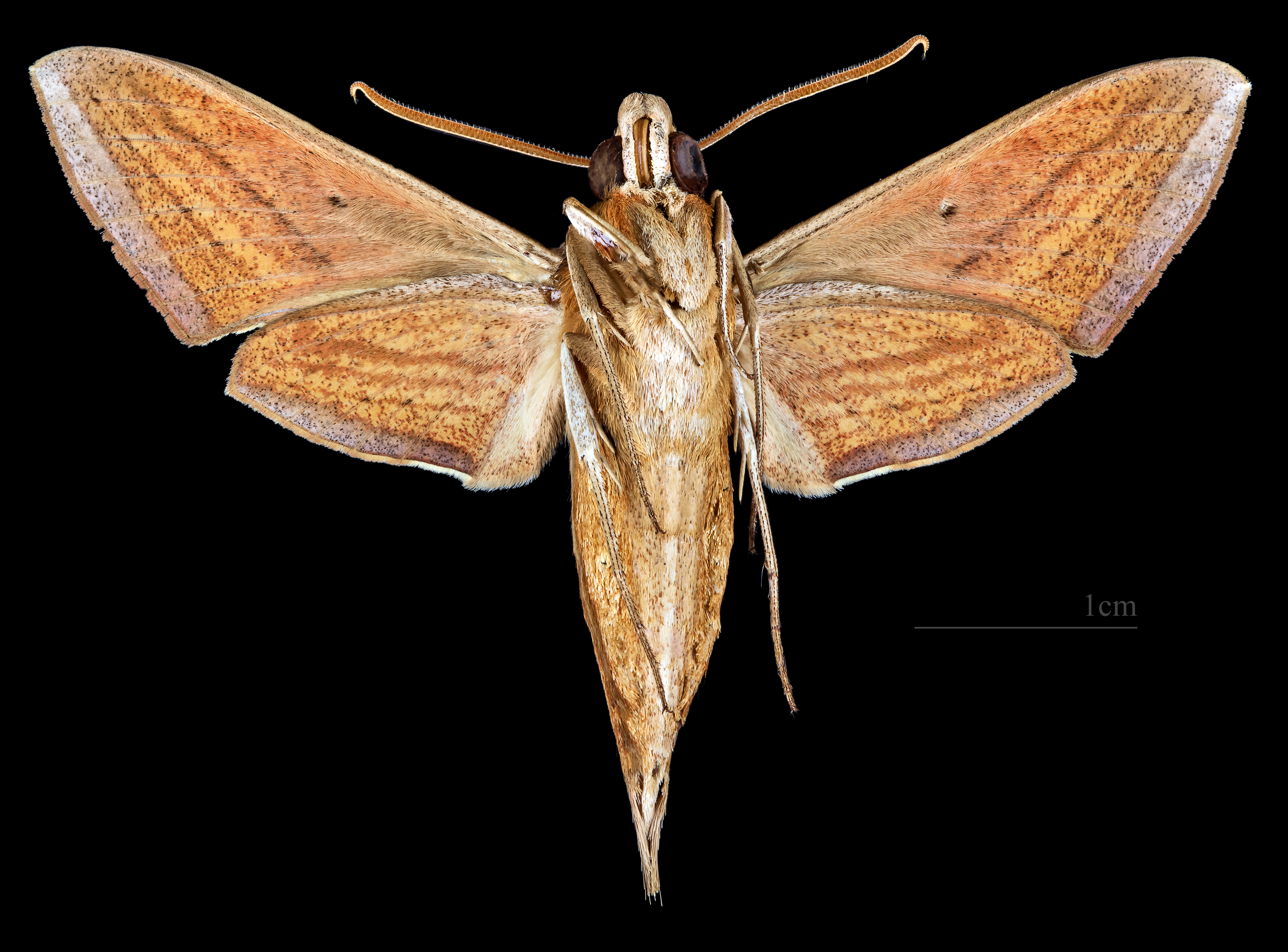
- Theretra lycetus ♂ △

Scientific classification
- Kingdom: Animalia
- Phylum: Arthropoda
- Class: Insecta
- Order: Lepidoptera
- Family: Sphingidae
- Genus: Theretra
- Species: T. lycetus

Binomial name
- Theretra lycetus (Cramer, 1775)

Synonyms
- Sphinx lycetus Cramer, 1775; Chaerocampa rosina Butler, 1875; Chaerocampa prunosa Butler, 1876

= Theretra lycetus =

White-edged hunter hawkmoth

Species of moth

Theretra lycetus, the white-edged hunter hawkmoth, is a moth of the family Sphingidae. It was described by Pieter Cramer in 1775.

== Distribution ==
Is known from south-east Asia, including Malaysia, Thailand, India, Sri Lanka and Indonesia.

== Description ==
The abdomen upperside has pale longitudinal double lines, which become indistinct posteriorly. The forewing upperside is similar to Theretra japonica, but the contrast between the darker postmedian lines and intervening pale bands is stronger. The hindwing upperside has a reddish median band of variable width.

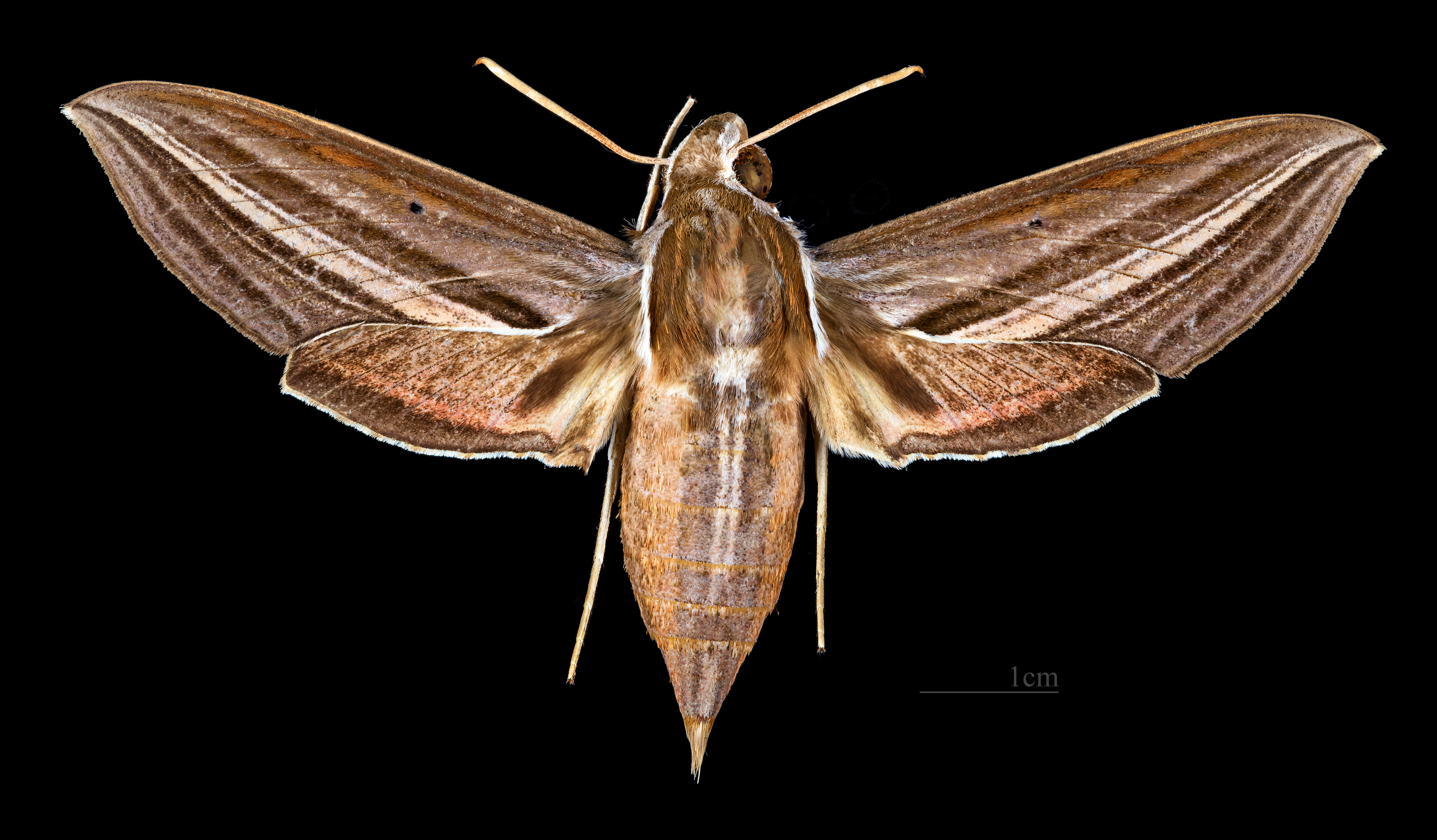
Theretra lycetus ♀

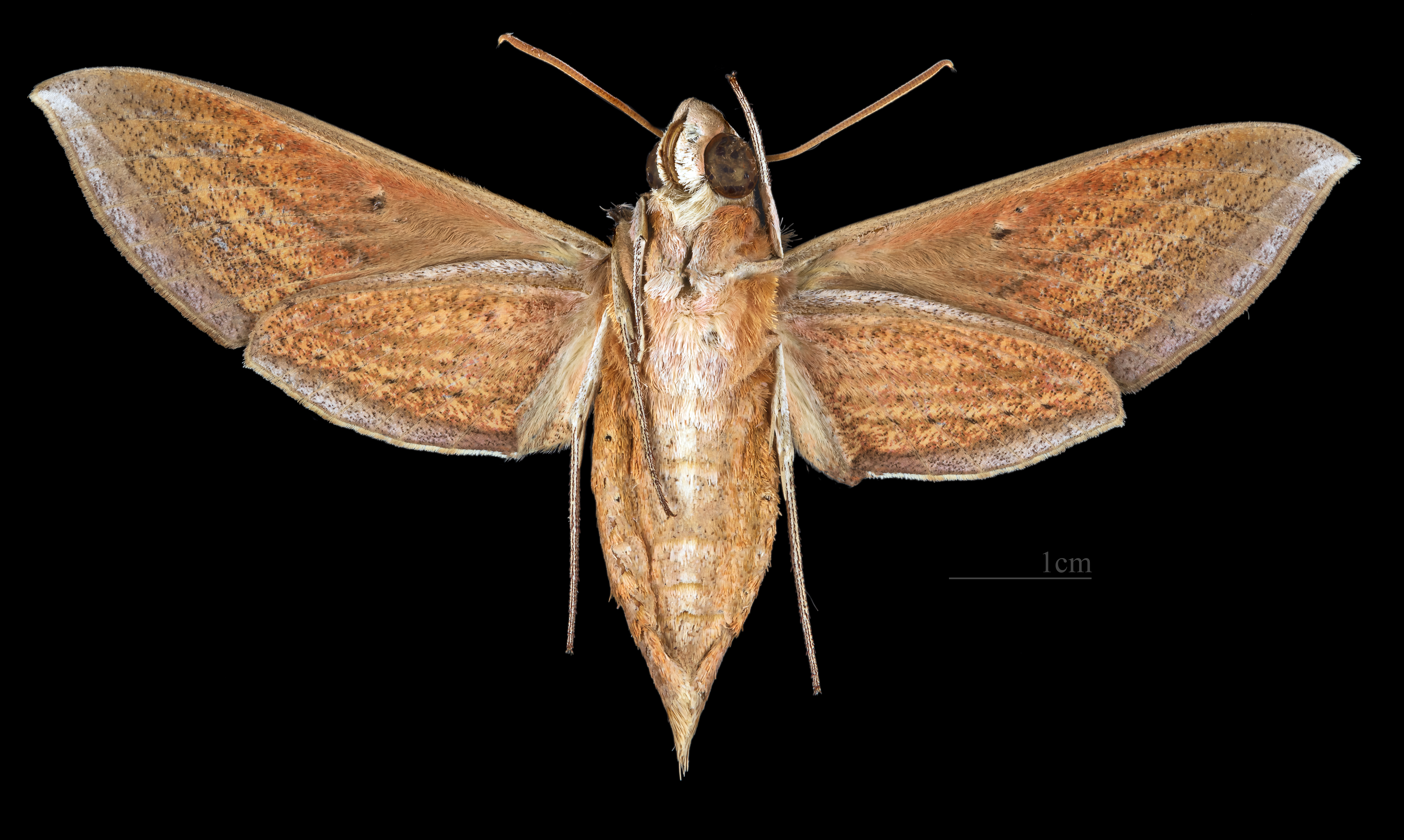
Theretra lycetus ♀ △

Differs from theylia in being brownish in color, with but a slight pink tinge; sides of abdomen golden yellow; the two dorsal lines paler. Fore wing with the oblique stripes from the apex silvery white. Hind wing blackish, with some flesh-colored suffusion on the submarginal area. Underside more ochreous and less pink than in theylia. The form lycetus = rosina from Mussooree and Sikhim is pinker in tone and has more flesh-color on the hind wing than drancus - prunosa from Ceylon (now Sri Lanka).

— The Fauna of British India, Including Ceylon and Burma: Moths Volume I
