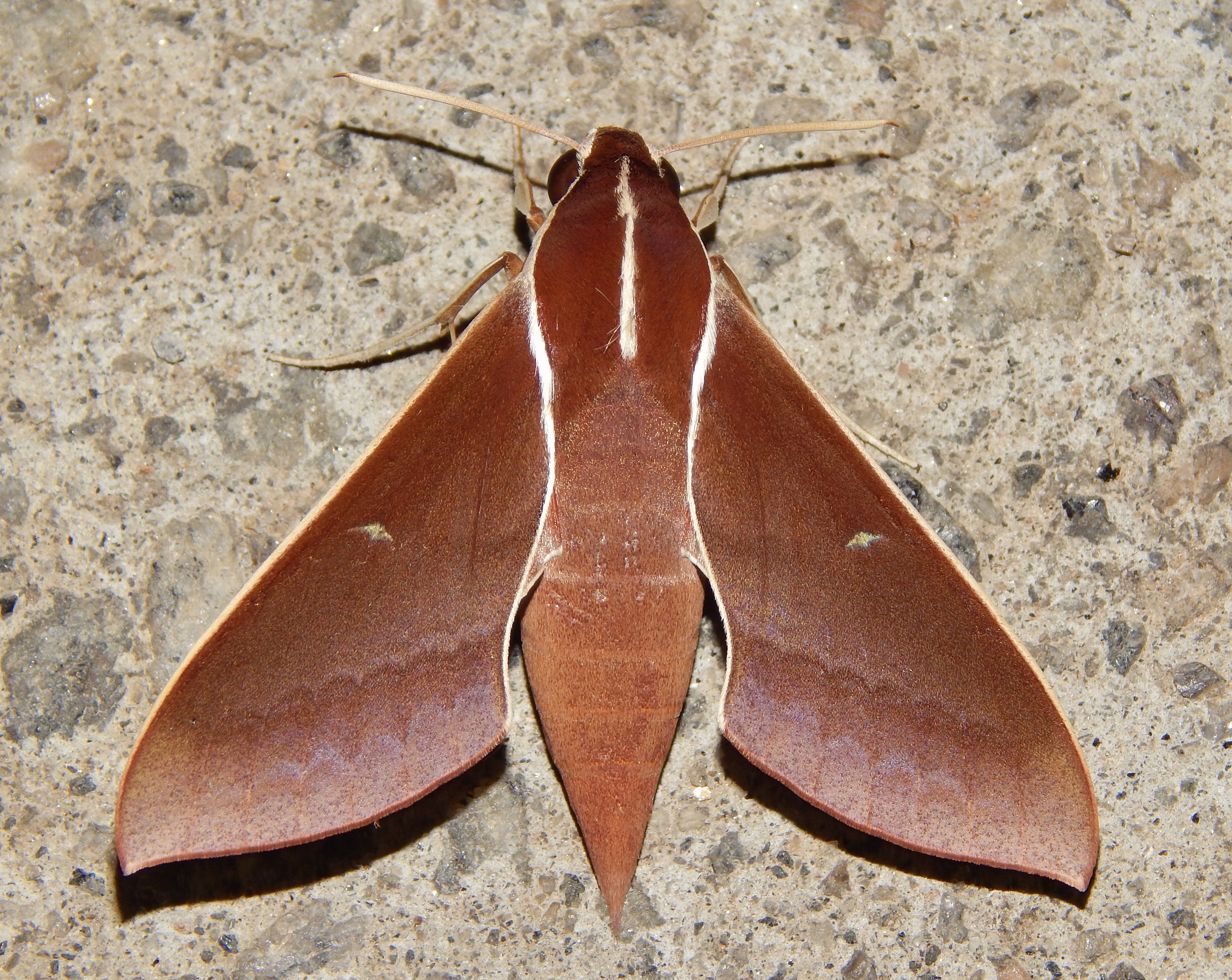
- Caterpillar, from Peravoor, India
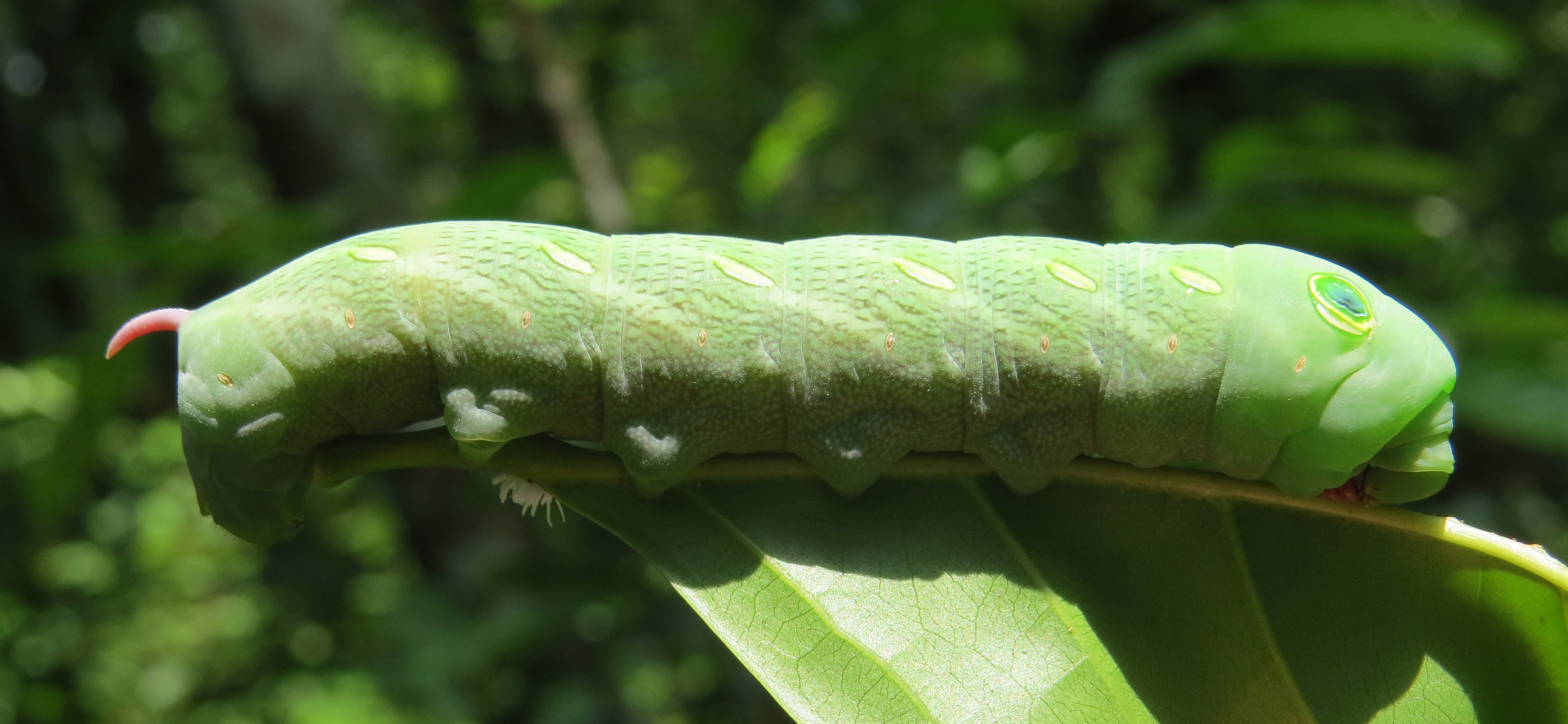

Scientific classification
- Kingdom: Animalia
- Phylum: Arthropoda
- Class: Insecta
- Order: Lepidoptera
- Family: Sphingidae
- Genus: Theretra
- Species: T. pallicosta

Binomial name
- Theretra pallicosta (Walker, 1856)

Synonyms
- Chaerocampa pallicosta Walker, 1856

= Theretra pallicosta =

White-edged hunter hawkmoth

Species of moth

Theretra pallicosta, the white-edged hunter hawkmoth, is a moth of the family Sphingidae described by Francis Walker in 1856. It is found from Sri Lanka and India, east through Nepal, Bangladesh and Myanmar to Hong Kong and Taiwan and south through Thailand, Laos and Vietnam to Peninsular Malaysia and Indonesia (Sumatra, Java).

== Description ==
The wingspan is 70–90 mm. It is distinguishable from all other Theretra species by the white forewing costa and discal spot, and a narrow white dorsal line restricted to the thorax. The thorax has a white medial line. The forewing upperside is purplish brown with only a serrate postmedian line clearly visible. The discal spot has the form of a small white dot. The costa is highlighted with white. The hindwing upperside is orange with a slightly darker, diffuse marginal band.

== Biology ==
The larvae have been recorded on Aporosa dioica in China, Aporosa species in India and Myanmar, Vitis species in Pakistan and Polyalthia cerasoides in Thailand.

== Gallery ==
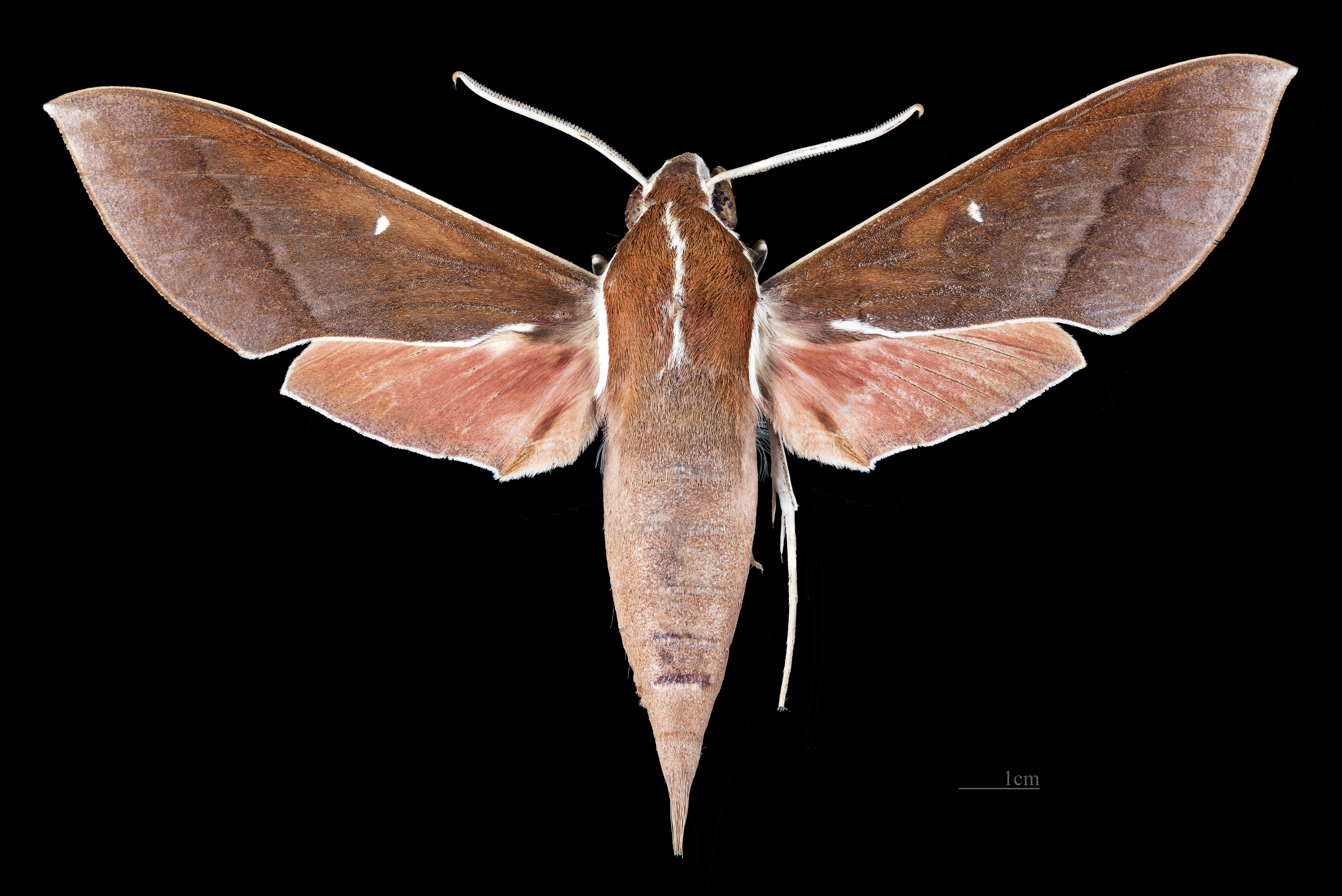
Male dorsal

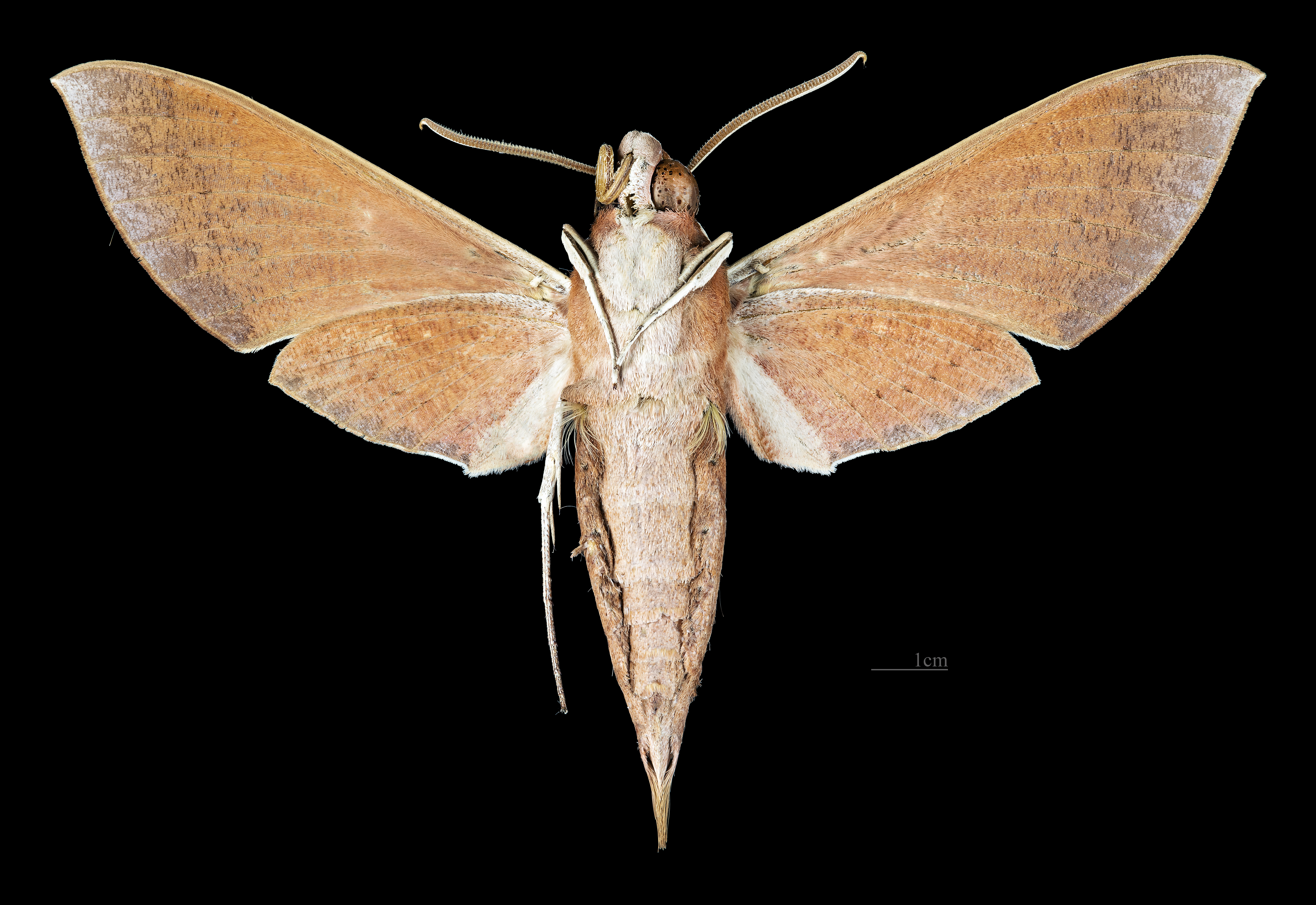
Male ventral

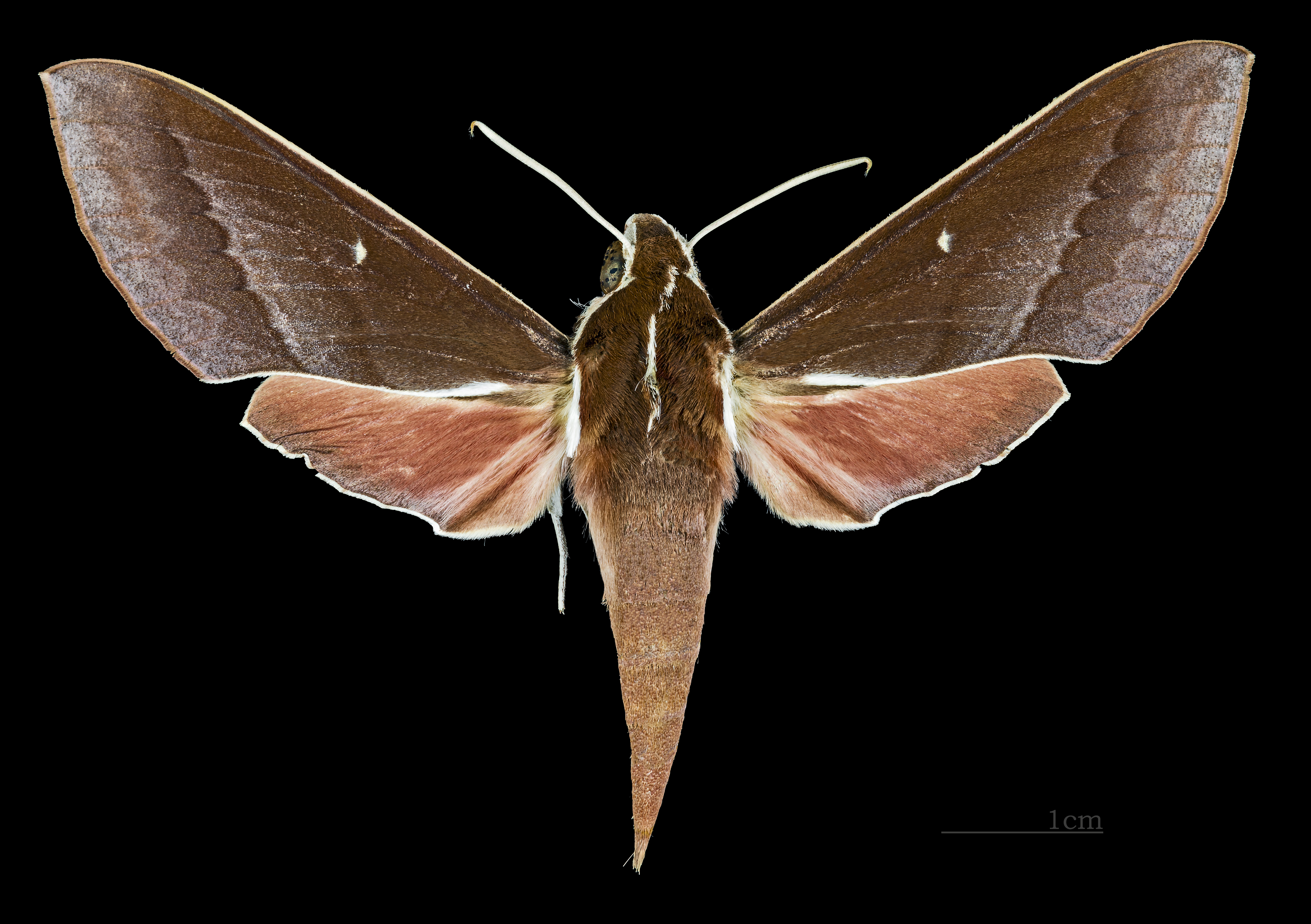
Dorsal view of female

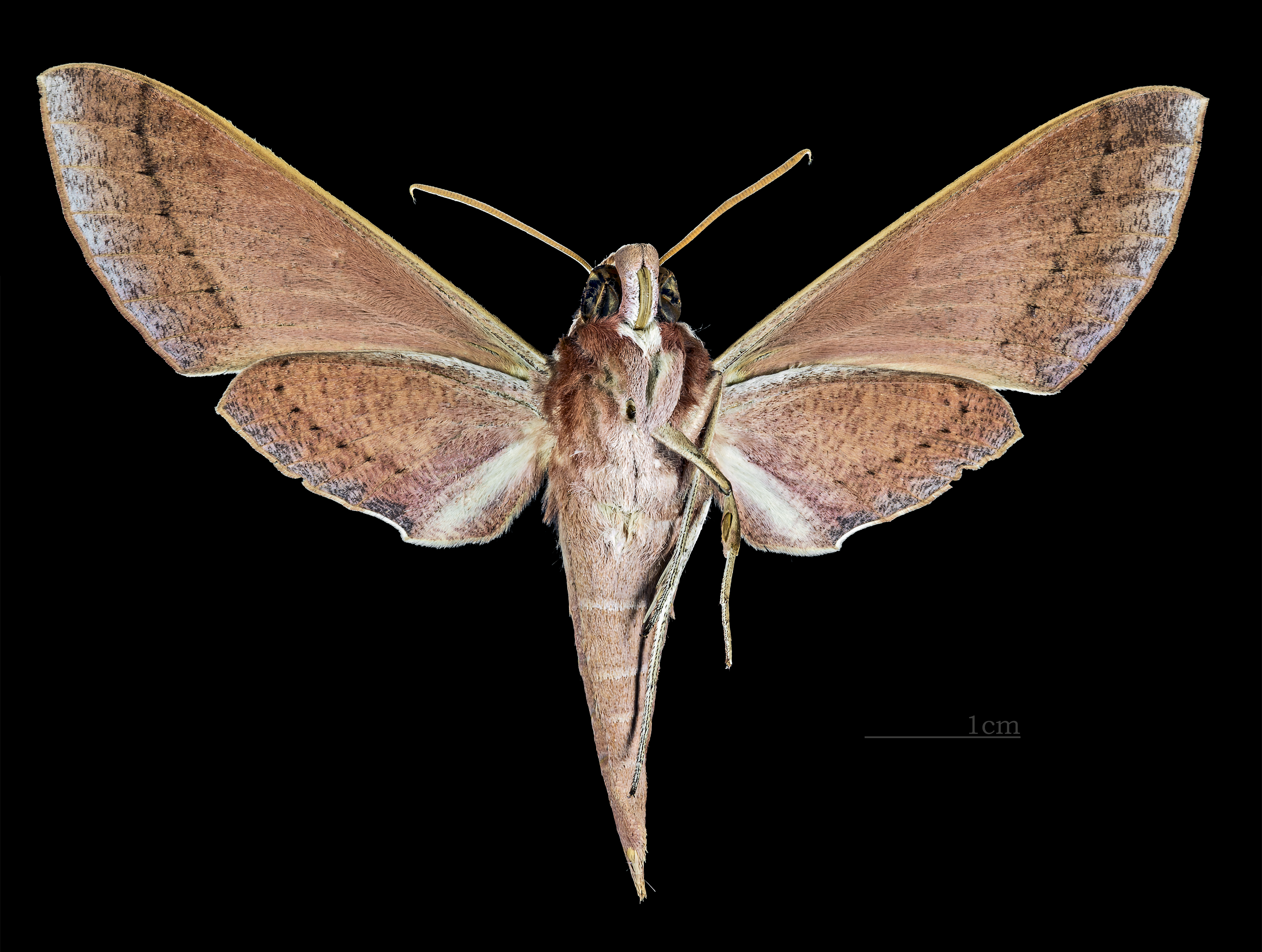
Ventral view of female
