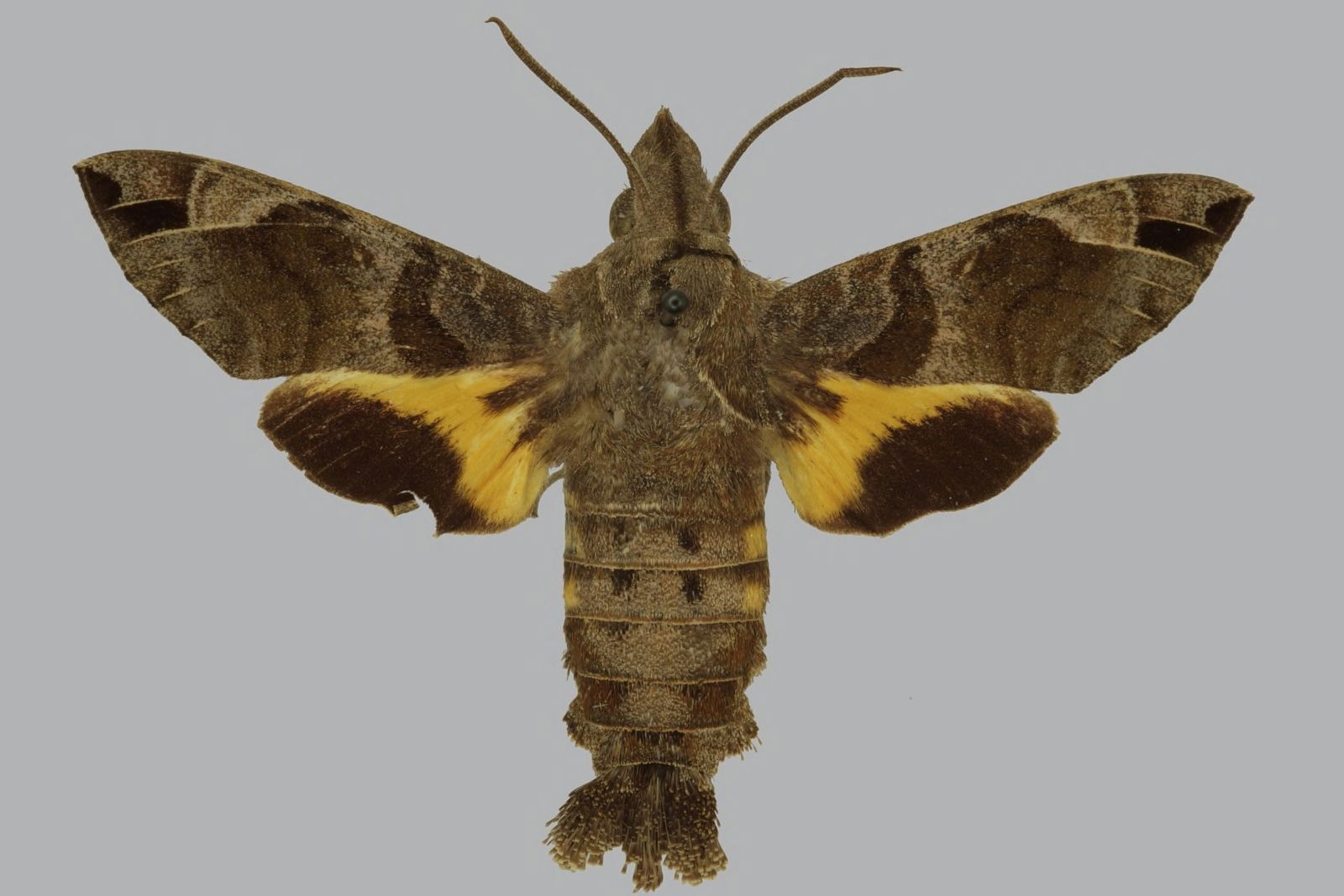

Scientific classification
- Kingdom: Animalia
- Phylum: Arthropoda
- Class: Insecta
- Order: Lepidoptera
- Family: Sphingidae
- Genus: Macroglossum
- Species: M. variegatum

Binomial name
- Macroglossum variegatum Rothschild & Jordan, 1903

= Macroglossum variegatum =

Species of moth

Macroglossum variegatum, the variegated hummingbird hawkmoth, is a moth of the family Sphingidae. It is known from north-eastern India, southern China, Thailand, Vietnam, Malaysia (Peninsular, Sarawak) and Indonesia (Sumatra, Java, Kalimantan).

The wingspan is 50–54 mm. Adults are attracted to the flowers of Duranta erecta.

The larvae have been recorded on Hedyotis species.
