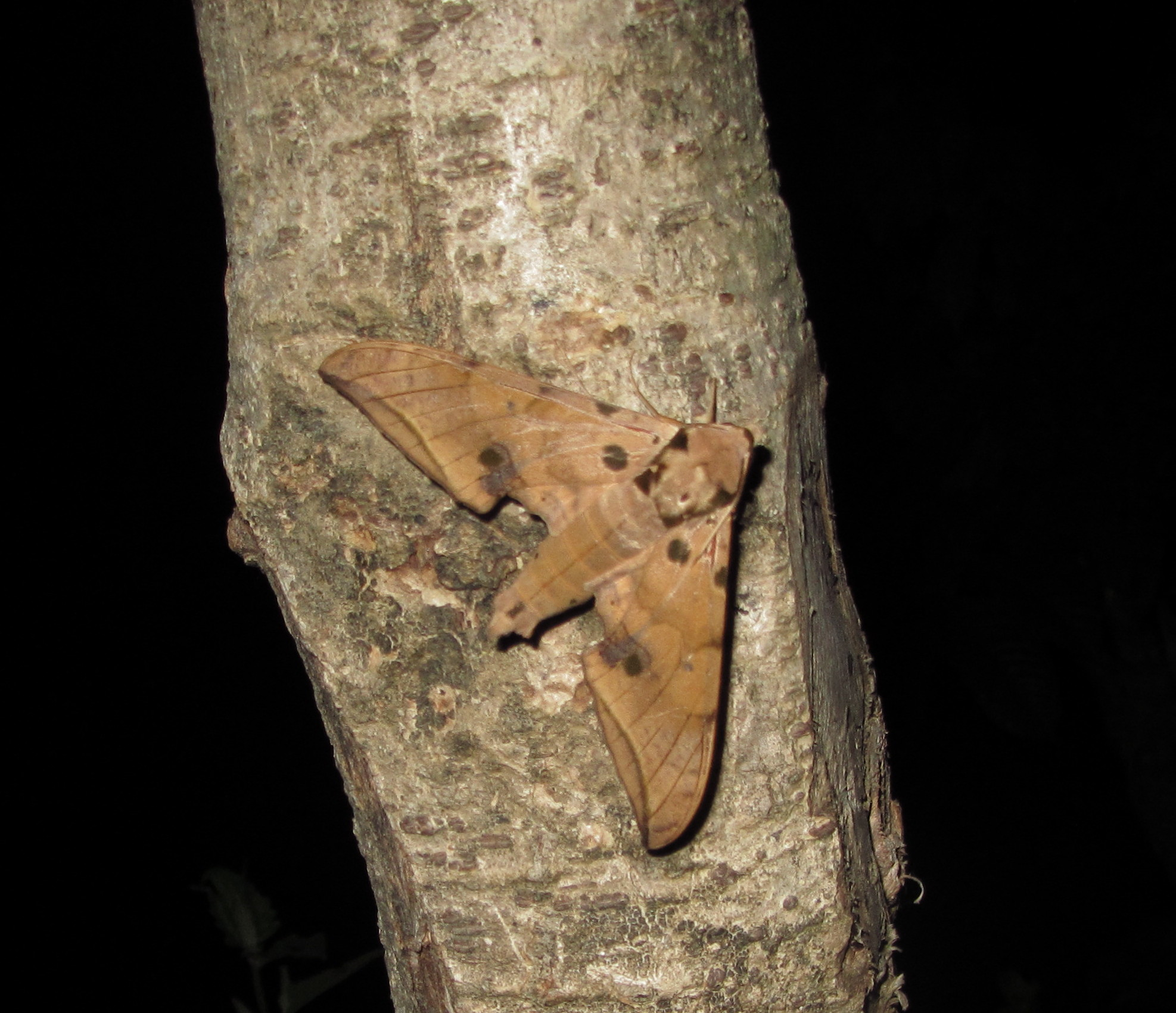

Scientific classification
- Kingdom: Animalia
- Phylum: Arthropoda
- Class: Insecta
- Order: Lepidoptera
- Family: Sphingidae
- Genus: Ambulyx
- Species: A. ochracea

Binomial name
- Ambulyx ochracea Butler, 1885

= Ambulyx ochracea =

Species of moth

Ambulyx ochracea, the ochreous gliding hawkmoth, is a species of moth in the family Sphingidae. The species was first described by Arthur Gardiner Butler in 1885.

== Range ==
It is found from Nepal and Sikkim, India, across central and southern China to South Korea and Japan, and south to Thailand, northern Vietnam and Taiwan.

== Description ==
The wingspan is 85–114 mm.

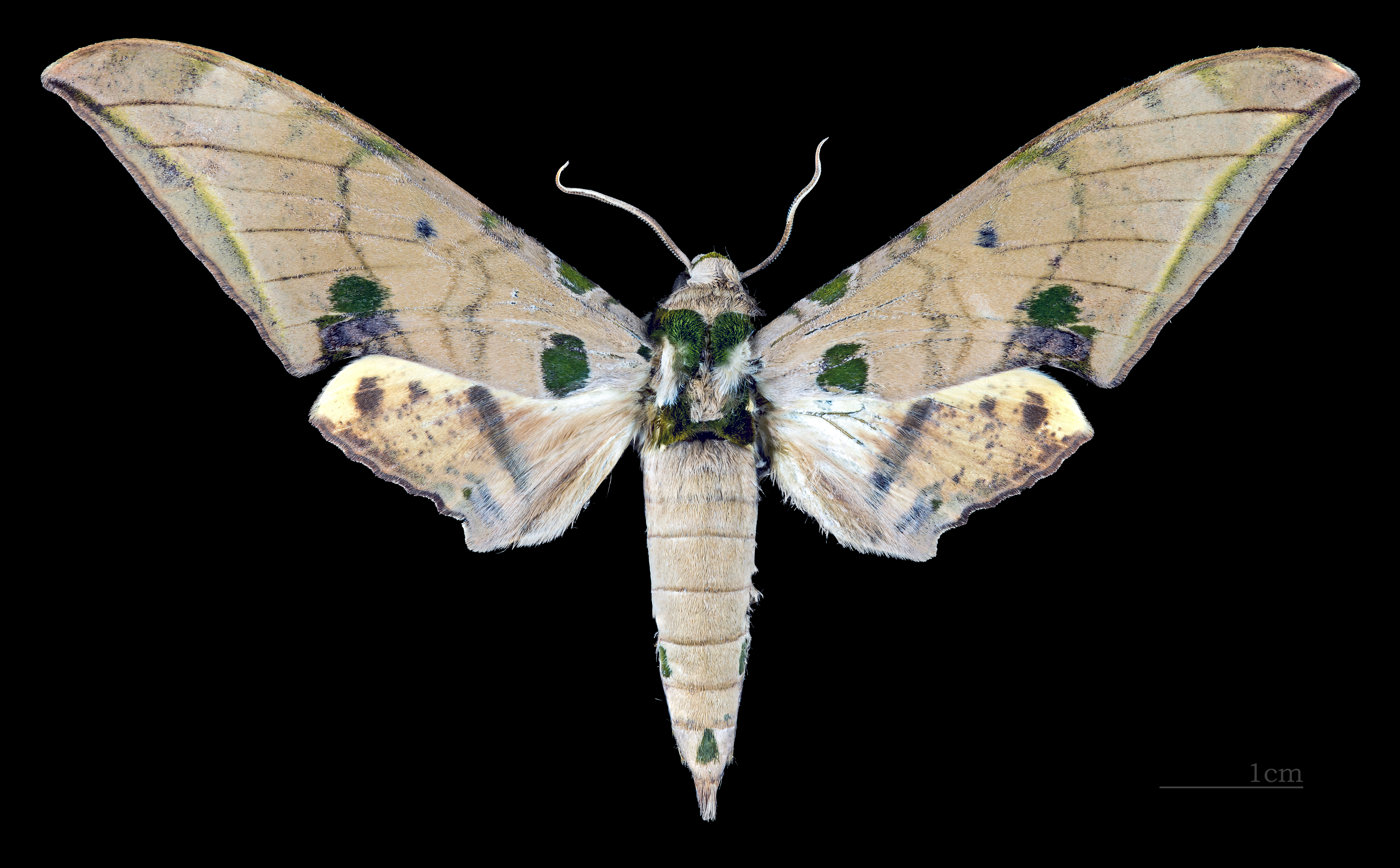
Male, dorsal view

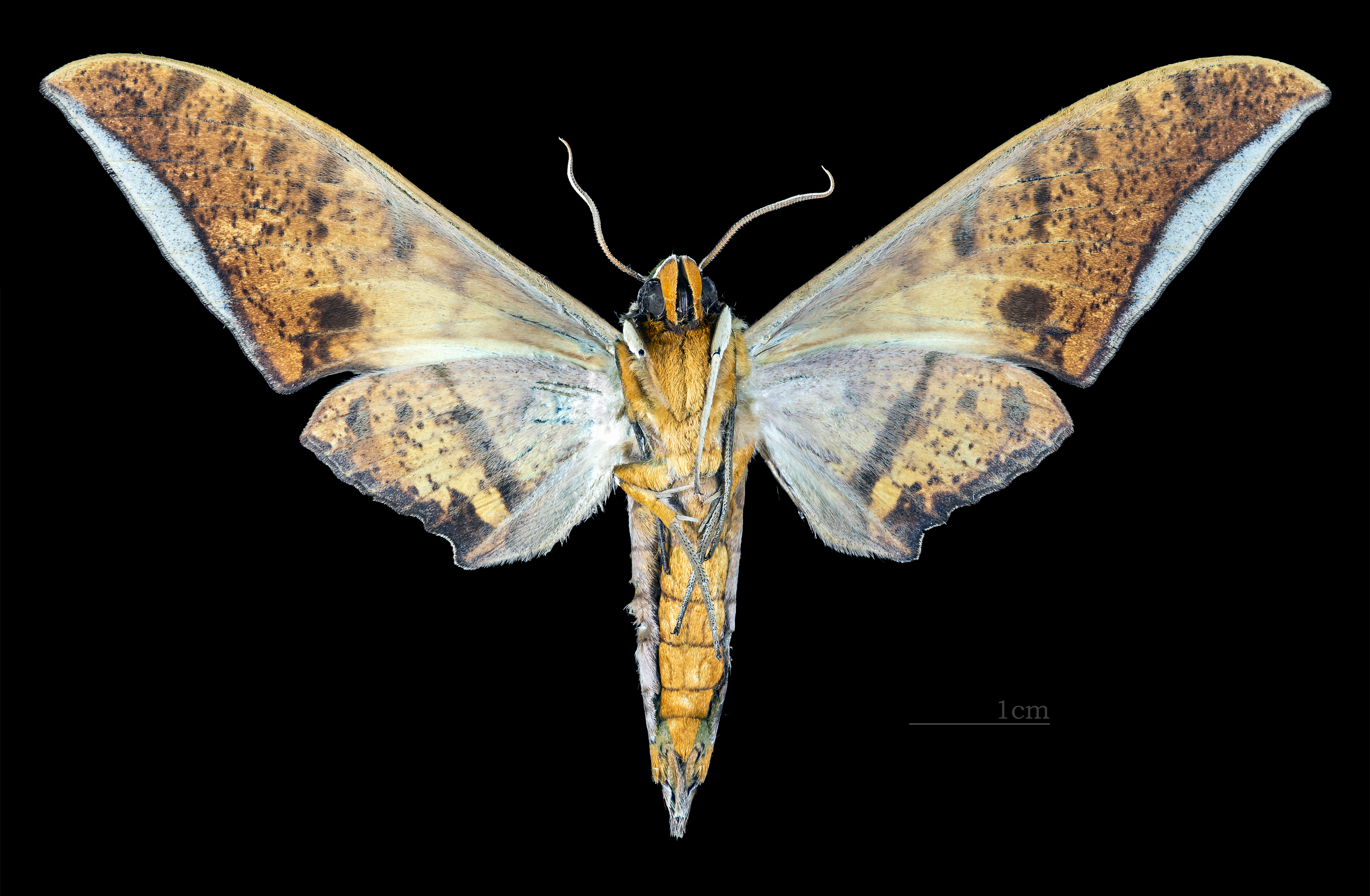
Male, ventral view

== Biology ==
Adults are on wing from late April to mid August in Korea. There are two generations per year.

Larvae have been recorded on Juglans regia in China and on Choerospondias fordii in India.
