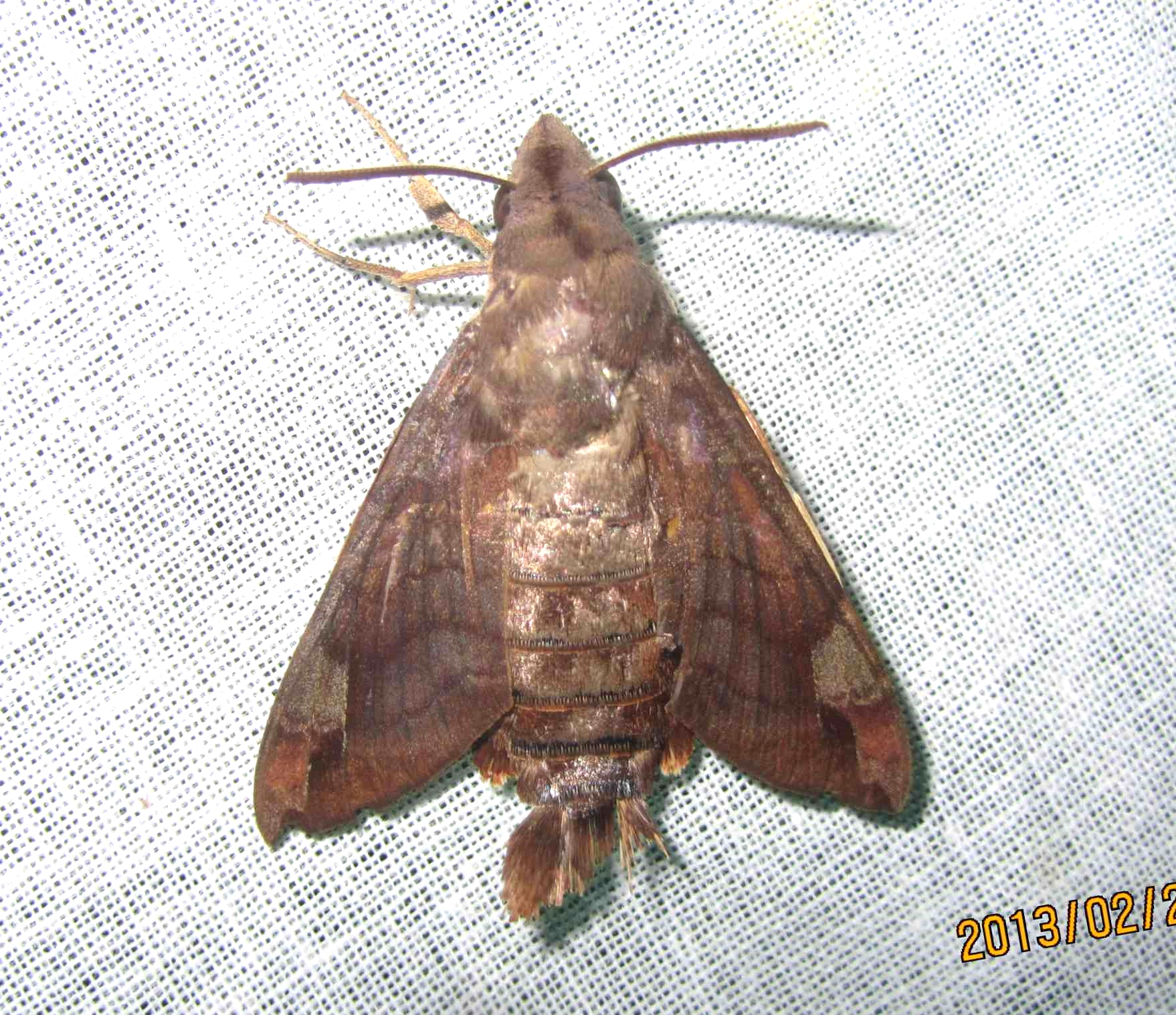

Scientific classification
- Kingdom: Animalia
- Phylum: Arthropoda
- Class: Insecta
- Order: Lepidoptera
- Family: Sphingidae
- Genus: Macroglossum
- Species: M. saga

Binomial name
- Macroglossum saga Butler, 1878

Synonyms
- Macroglossa glaucoplaga Hampson, 1900; Macroglossa kiushiuensis Rothschild, 1894

= Macroglossum saga =

Species of moth

Macroglossum saga, the grey-tipped hummingbird hawkmoth, is a moth of the family Sphingidae.

== Range ==
Larvae have been recorded on Daphniphyllum macropodum in Korea.
