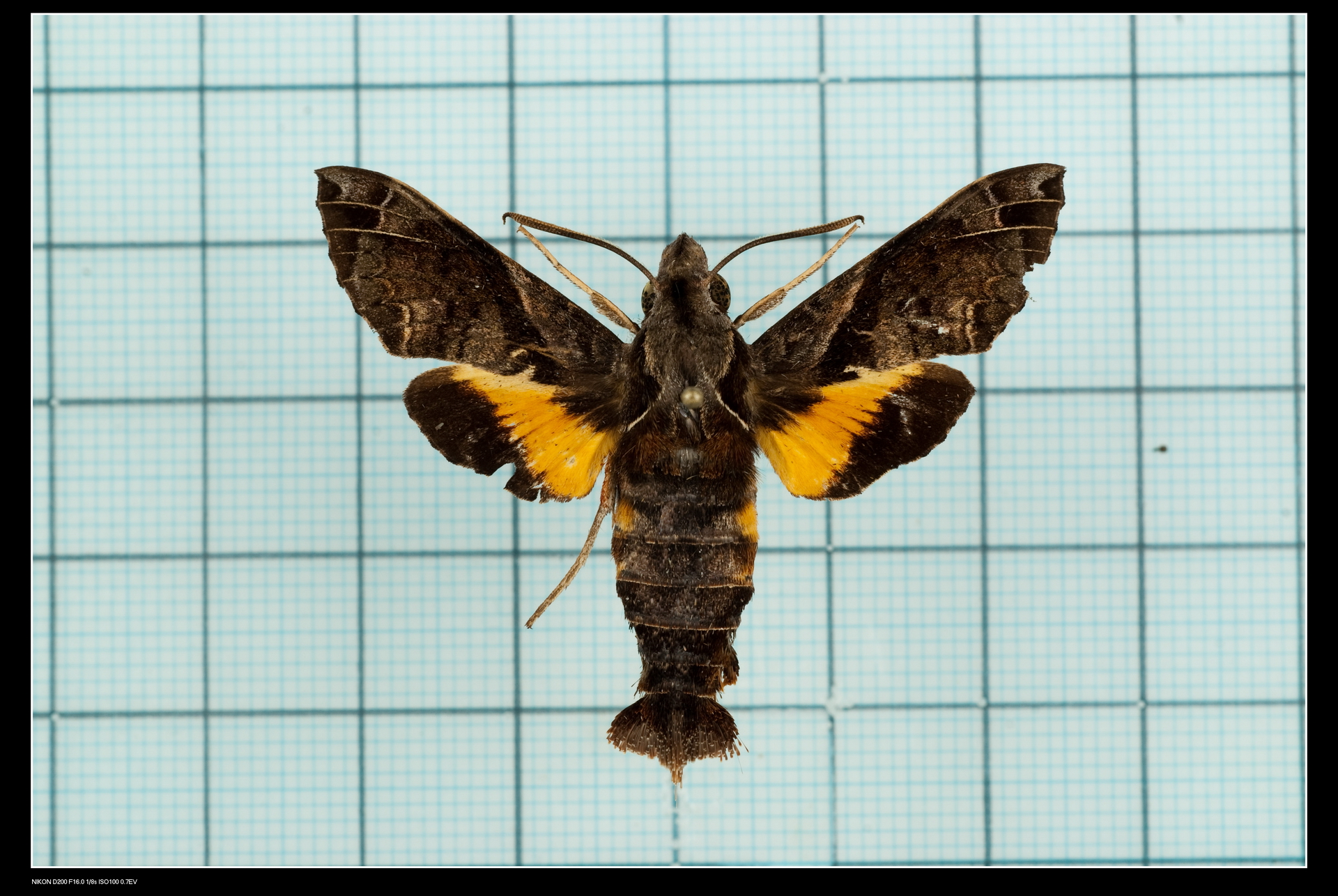

Scientific classification
- Kingdom: Animalia
- Phylum: Arthropoda
- Class: Insecta
- Order: Lepidoptera
- Family: Sphingidae
- Genus: Macroglossum
- Species: M. fritzei

Binomial name
- Macroglossum fritzei Rothschild & Jordan, 1903

Synonyms
- Macroglossum hunanensis Chu & Wang, 1980

= Macroglossum fritzei =

Species of moth

Macroglossum fritzei is a moth of the family Sphingidae. It is known from south-eastern China, central and southern Japan, Thailand and Borneo.

The length of the forewings is 21 mm. This species differs from all other species of Macroglossum in the very oblique antemedian band of the forewing. The head and thorax uppersides are dark grey. The abdomen upperside is blackish-brown. The palpus underside is reddish grey. The thorax underside is pale red centrally, darker laterally. The abdomen underside is bright tawny, the apical margins brown with a lateral series of conspicuous buff-yellow spots. The forewing underside is reddish-chestnut, while the extreme base is yellowish, the blackish-brown border is very distinct, due to a series of irregular buff-yellow postdiscal patches. The hindwing underside has a broad yellow band. The hindwing underside is reddish anteriorly, with the base and anal areas yellow gradually shading off on the disc. The brown border is sharply marked, with indications of pale yellow spots at its proximal edge.

The larvae feed on Morinda and Paederia species, including Morinda umbellata in Hong Kong.
