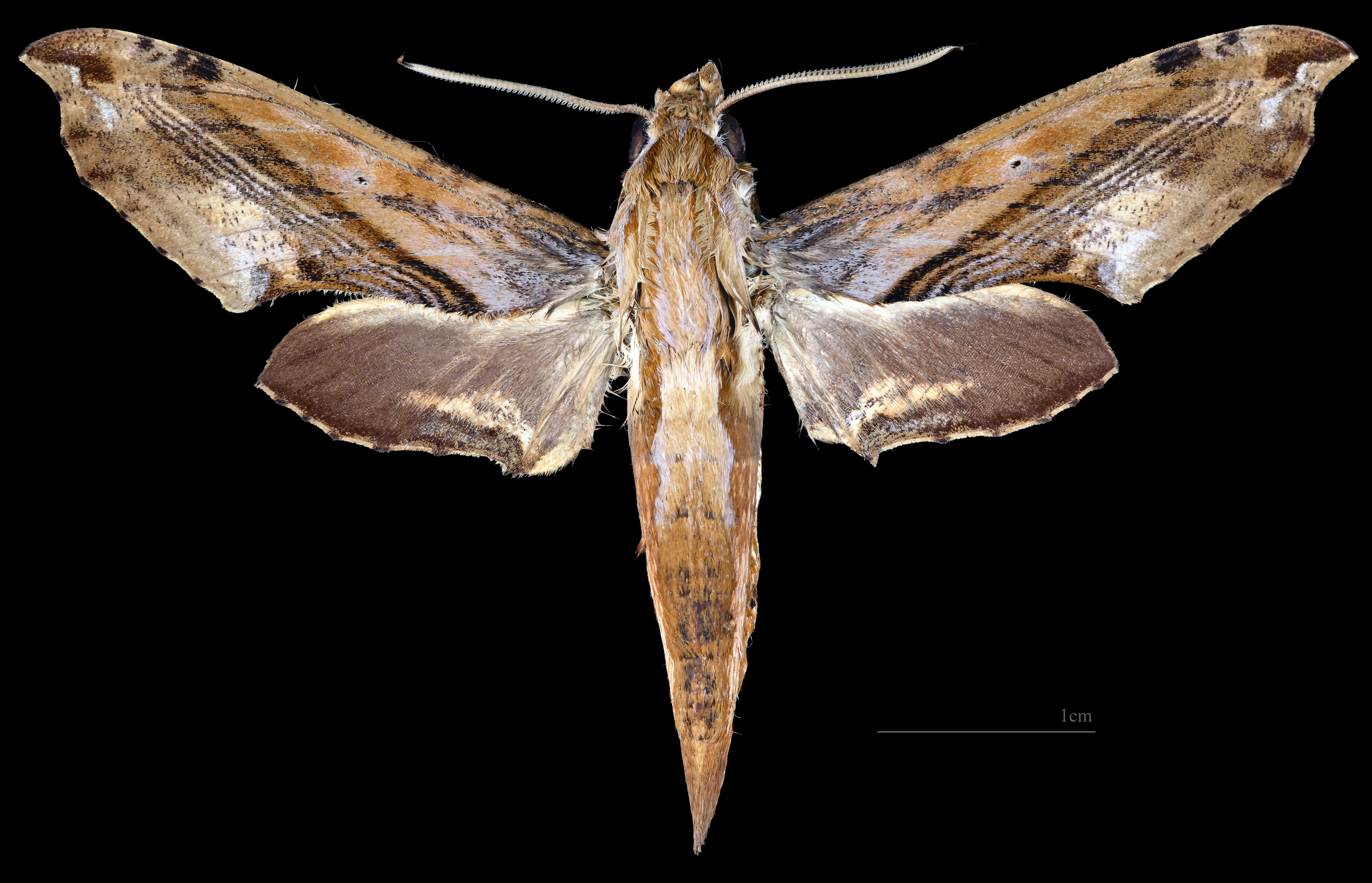
- Male dorsal
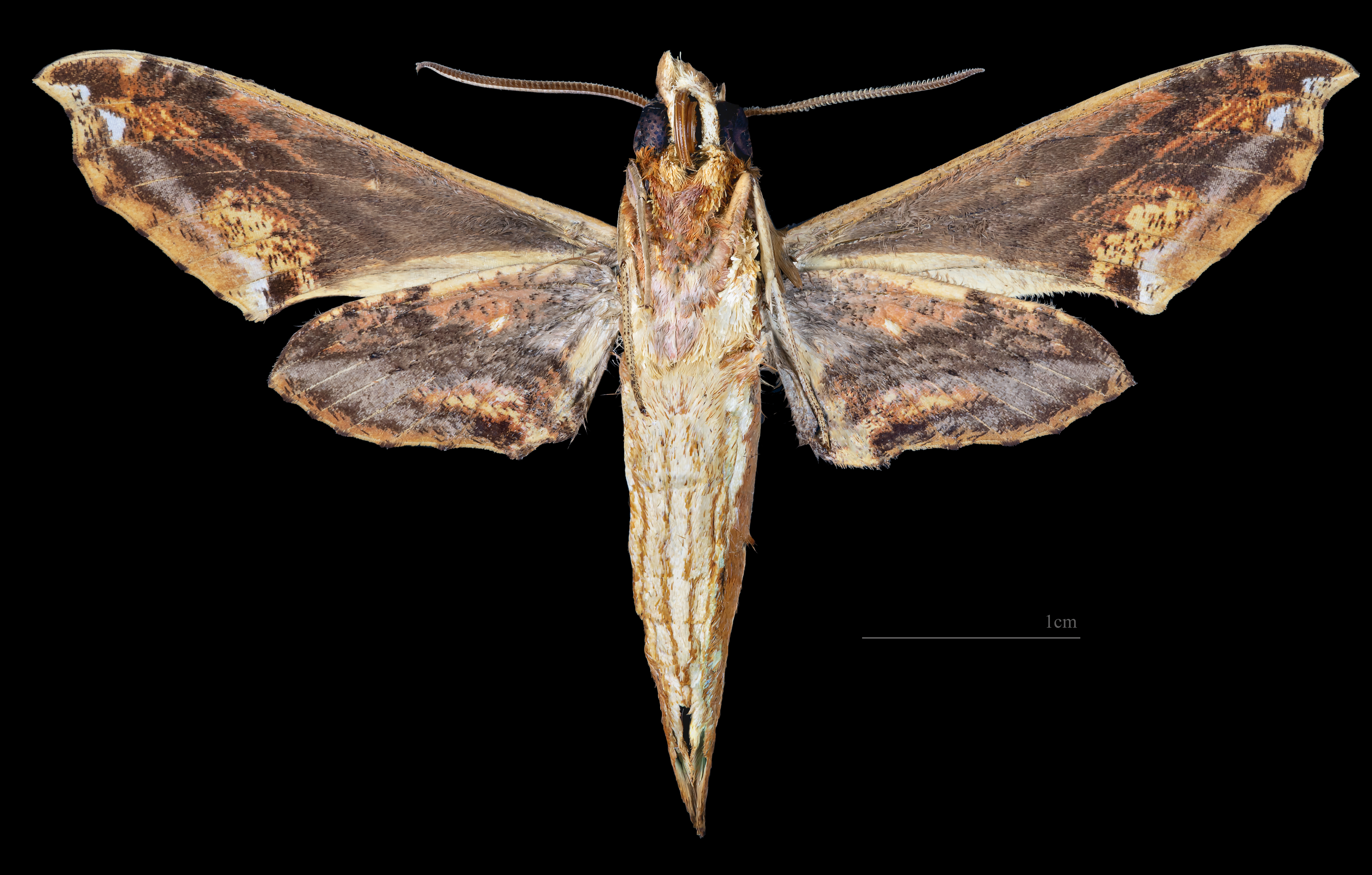
- Male ventral

Scientific classification
- Kingdom: Animalia
- Phylum: Arthropoda
- Class: Insecta
- Order: Lepidoptera
- Family: Sphingidae
- Genus: Eupanacra
- Species: E. sinuata

Binomial name
- Eupanacra sinuata (Rothschild & Jordan, 1903)

Synonyms
- Panacra sinuata Rothschild & Jordan, 1903

= Eupanacra sinuata =

Species of moth

Eupanacra sinuata, the sinuous rippled hawkmoth, is a moth of the family Sphingidae. It is known from Nepal, north-eastern India, south-western China, northern Thailand and Vietnam.

The wingspan is 58–68 mm. The middle of the thorax upperside and proximal abdominal tergites are pale (as in similar Eupanacra variolosa). There is a blackish brown stripe underneath the tegula continuing onto the abdomen. The forewing upperside has five postmedian lines. The basal part of the forewing underside and the hindwing underside are drab brown (although the costal margin, inner margin and narrow submarginal band on the hindwing underside are ochre speckled with brown), while the hindwing upperside has a narrow and pale median band.
