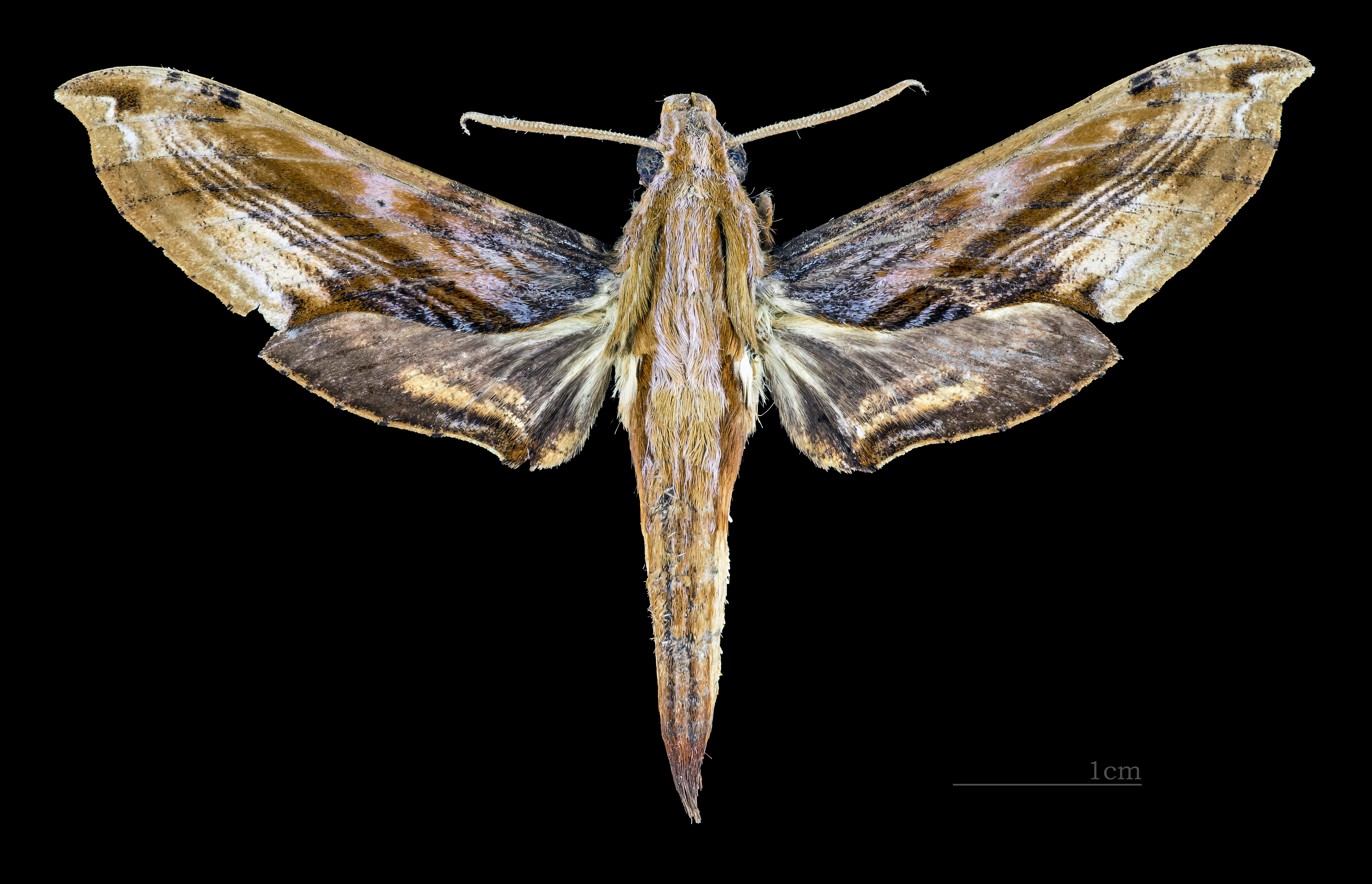
- Male, dorsal view
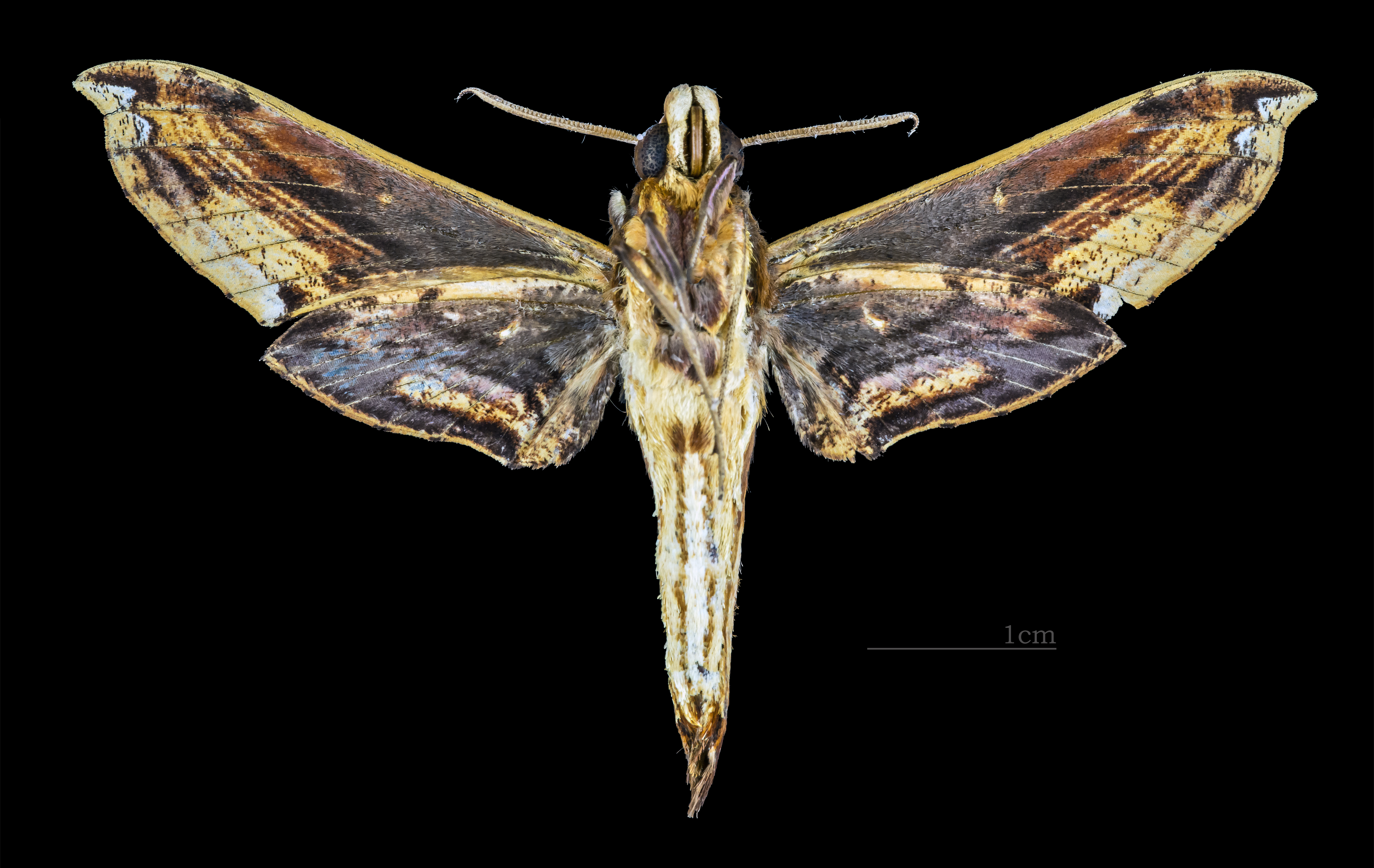
- Male, ventral view

Scientific classification
- Kingdom: Animalia
- Phylum: Arthropoda
- Class: Insecta
- Order: Lepidoptera
- Family: Sphingidae
- Genus: Eupanacra
- Species: E. metallica

Binomial name
- Eupanacra metallica (Butler, 1875)

Synonyms
- Panacra metallica Butler, 1875; Panacra metallica anfracta Gehlen, 1930; Panacra sinuata birmanica Bryk, 1944

= Eupanacra metallica =

Species of moth

Eupanacra metallica is a moth of the family Sphingidae first described by Arthur Gardiner Butler in 1875.

== Distribution ==
It is found from north-western India across Nepal, Bhutan, Bangladesh and northern Myanmar to south-western China.

== Description ==
The wingspan is 60–73 mm.

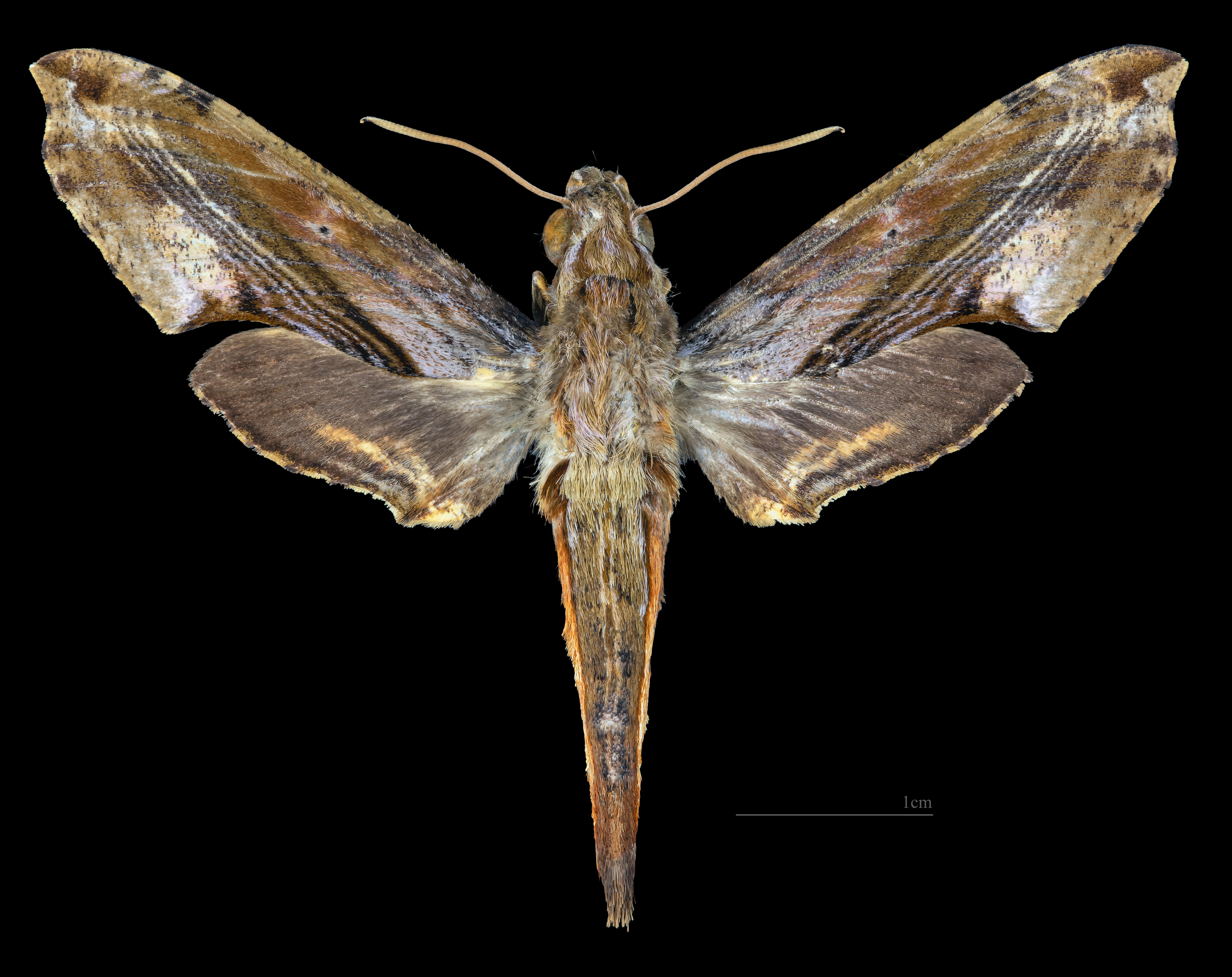
Female, dorsal view

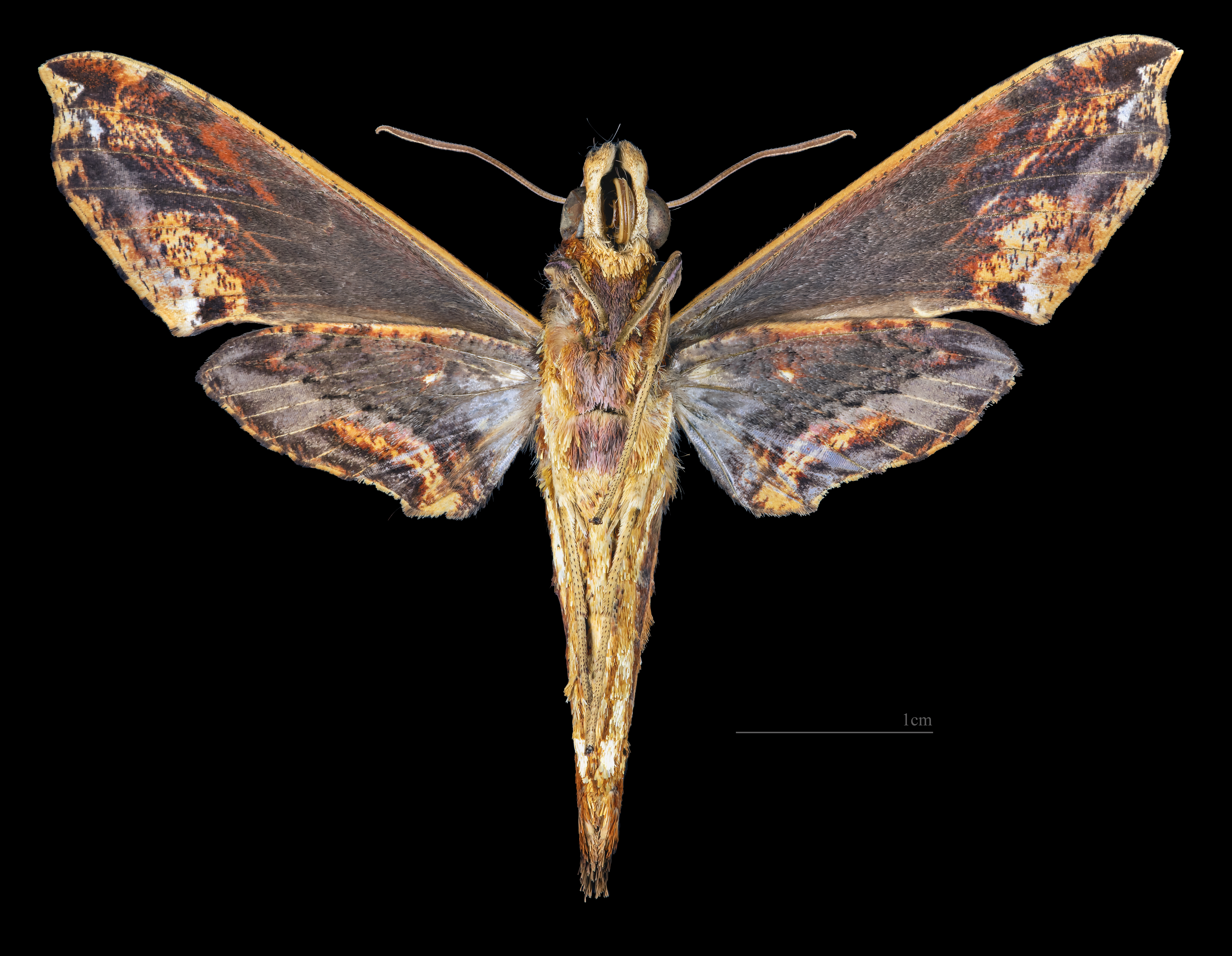
Female, ventral view

== Biology ==
The larvae feed on Arisaema tortuosum in India.
