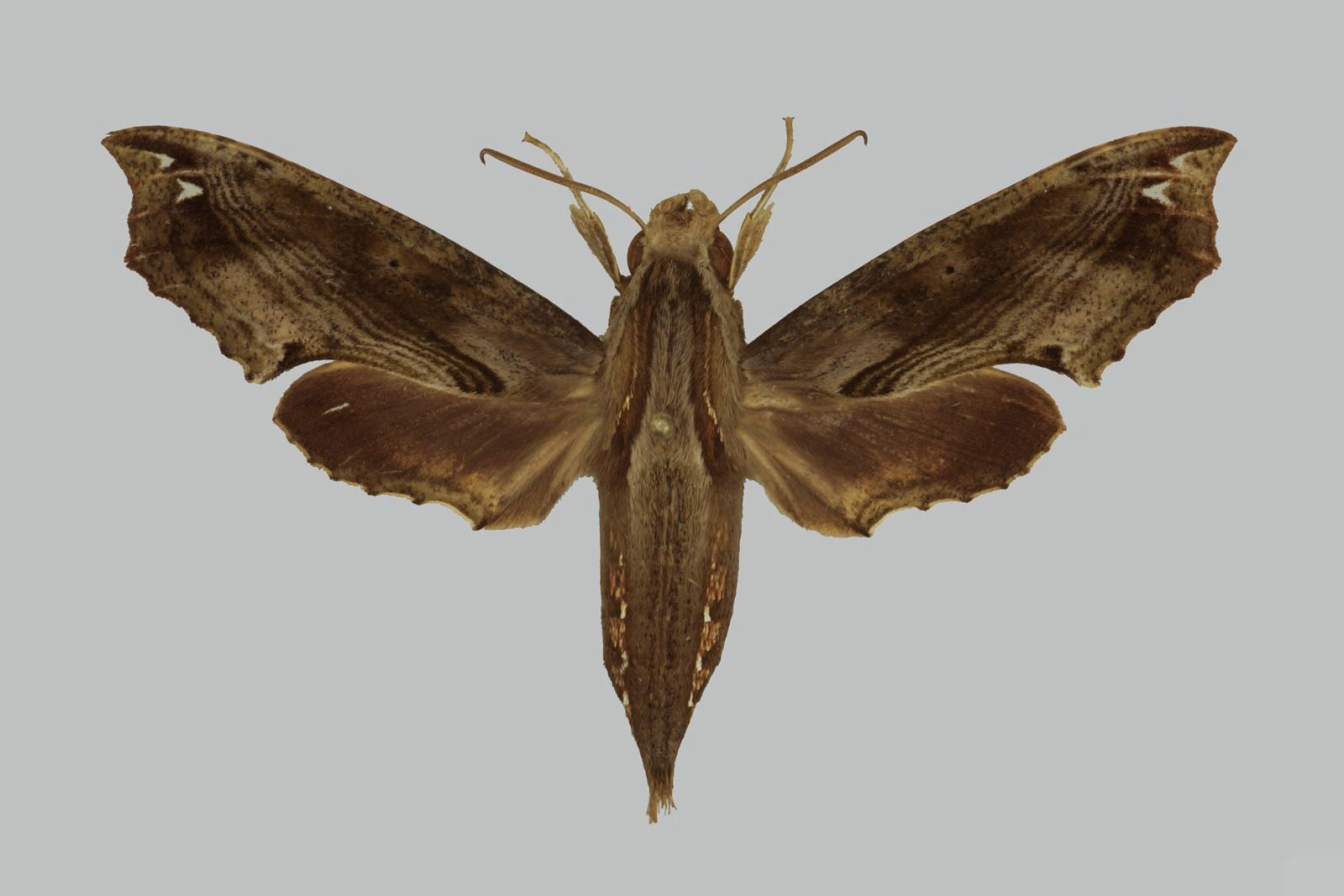

Scientific classification
- Kingdom: Animalia
- Phylum: Arthropoda
- Class: Insecta
- Order: Lepidoptera
- Family: Sphingidae
- Genus: Eupanacra
- Species: E. tiridates

Binomial name
- Eupanacra tiridates (Boisduval, 1875)

Synonyms
- Panacra tiridates Boisduval, 1875

= Eupanacra tiridates =

Species of moth

Eupanacra tiridates is a moth of the family Sphingidae. It is known from the Philippines.

It is similar to Eupanacra regularis regularis, but the postmedian lines on the forewing upperside are less curved. There is a black costal mark, a smaller costal spot and a triangular, white subapical mark present.
