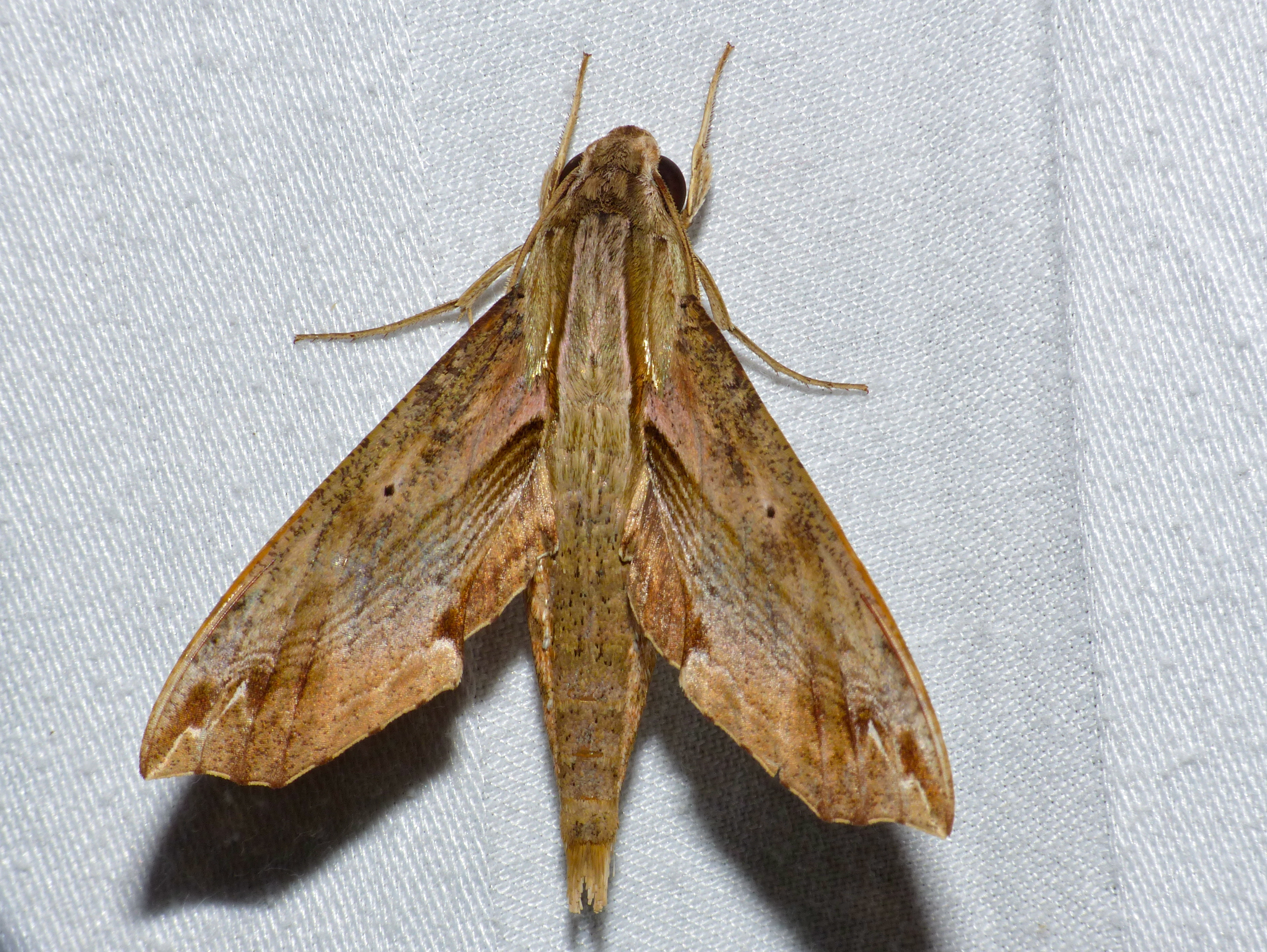

Scientific classification
- Kingdom: Animalia
- Phylum: Arthropoda
- Class: Insecta
- Order: Lepidoptera
- Family: Sphingidae
- Genus: Eupanacra
- Species: E. regularis

Binomial name
- Eupanacra regularis (Butler, 1875)

Synonyms
- Panacra regularis Butler, 1875; Panacra dohertyi Rothschild, 1894; Panacra regularis continentalis Gehlen, 1930

= Eupanacra regularis =

Species of moth

Eupanacra regularis is a moth of the family Sphingidae.

== Distribution ==
It is known from India and south-east Asia, including Myanmar, Thailand, Malaysia (Peninsular) and Indonesia (Sumatra, Borneo, Java).

== Description ==
It is similar to Eupanacra automedon.

== Subspecies ==
- Eupanacra regularis regularis
- Eupanacra regularis continentalis (Gehlen, 1930) (India)
