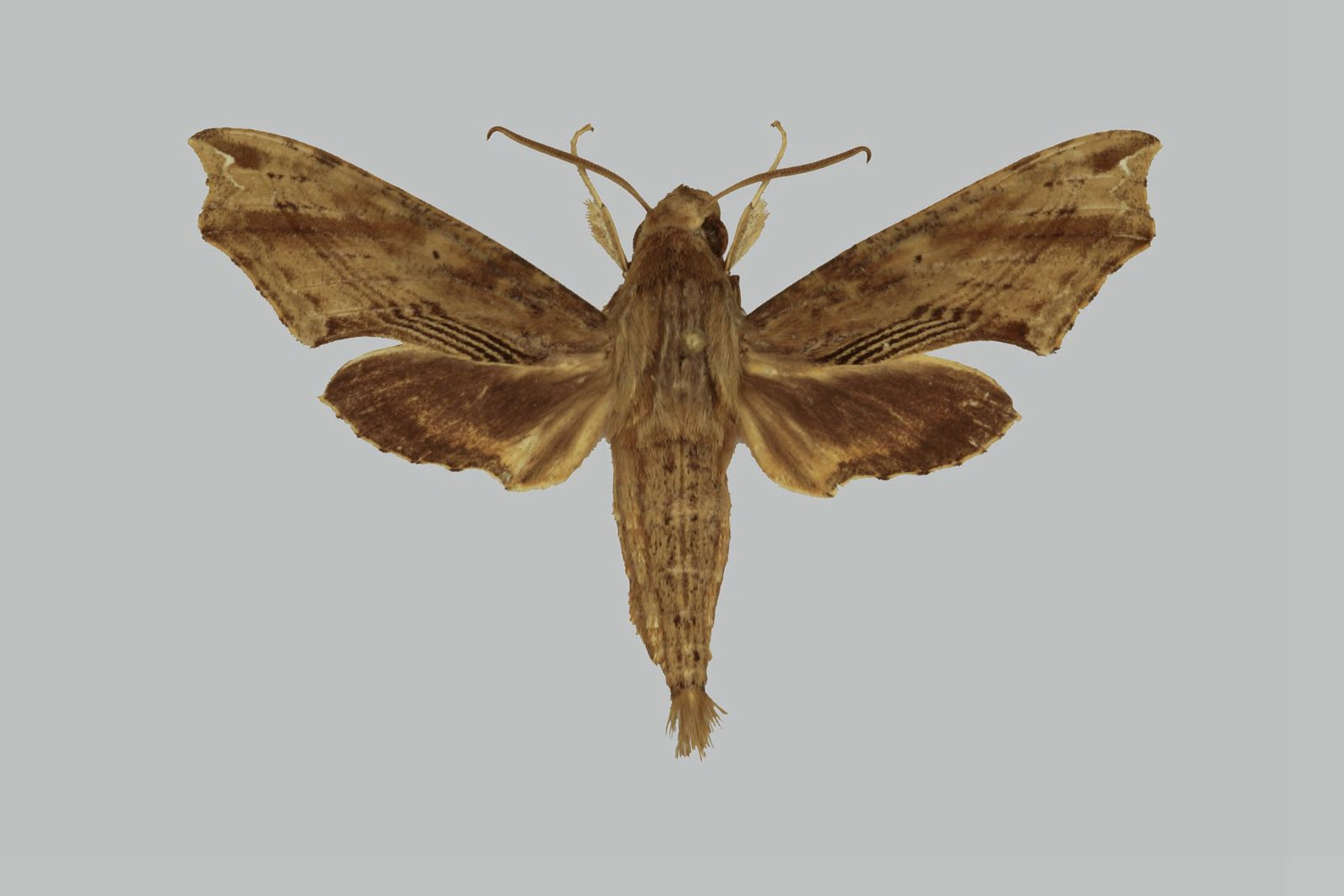

Scientific classification
- Kingdom: Animalia
- Phylum: Arthropoda
- Class: Insecta
- Order: Lepidoptera
- Family: Sphingidae
- Genus: Eupanacra
- Species: E. mindanaensis

Binomial name
- Eupanacra mindanaensis Brechlin, 2000

= Eupanacra mindanaensis =

Species of moth

Eupanacra mindanaensis is a moth of the family Sphingidae. It is known from the Philippines.

The length of the forewings is 24–26 mm for males and 26–29 mm for females. It is similar to Eupanacra malayana. Furthermore, the gold bands on the abdomen are more clearly visible. There is a pale median band on the hindwing upperside.
