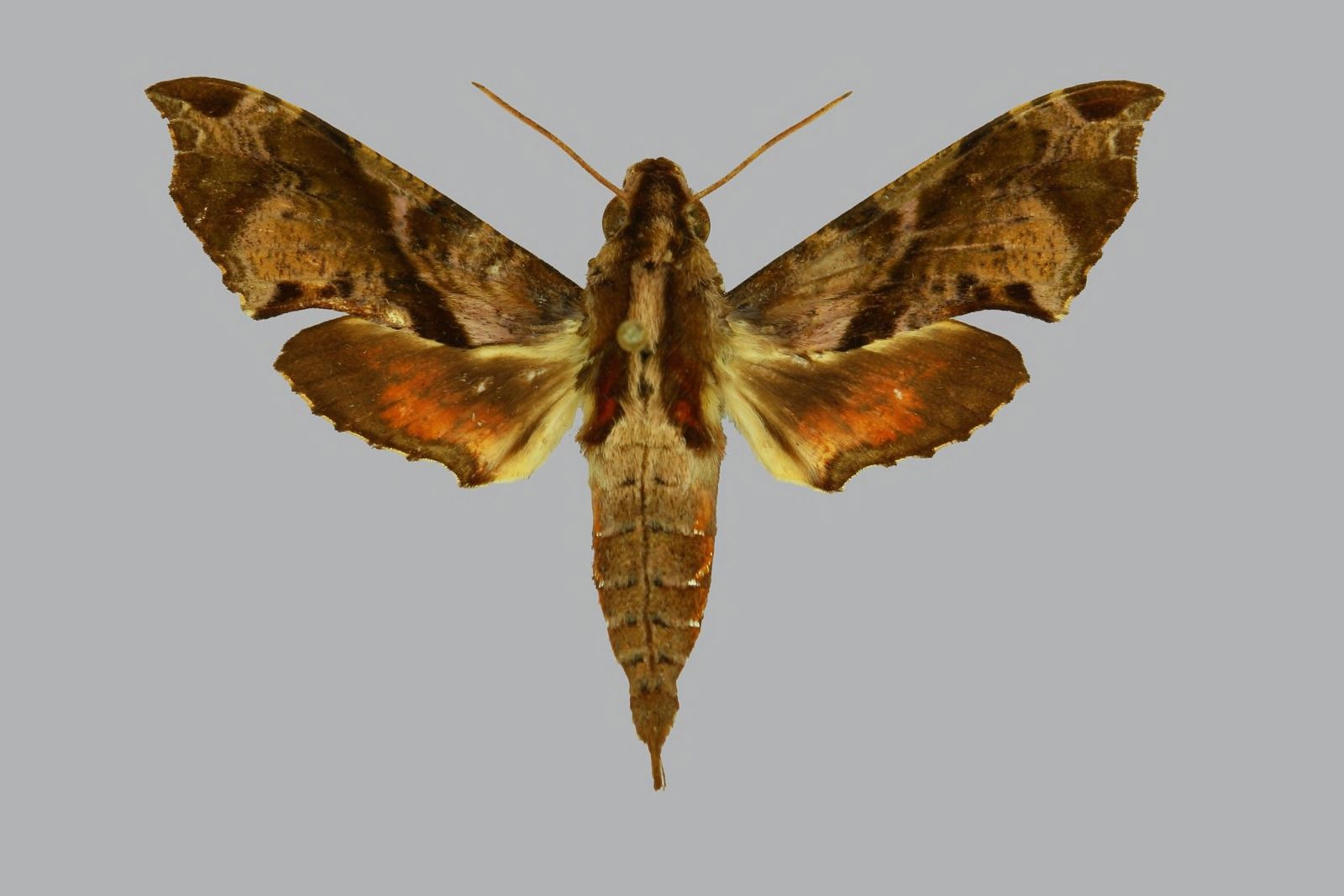

Scientific classification
- Kingdom: Animalia
- Phylum: Arthropoda
- Clade: Pancrustacea
- Class: Insecta
- Order: Lepidoptera
- Family: Sphingidae
- Genus: Eupanacra
- Species: E. poulardi

Binomial name
- Eupanacra poulardi Cadiou & Holloway, 1989

= Eupanacra poulardi =

Species of moth

Eupanacra poulardi is a moth of the family Sphingidae. It is known from Sulawesi.
