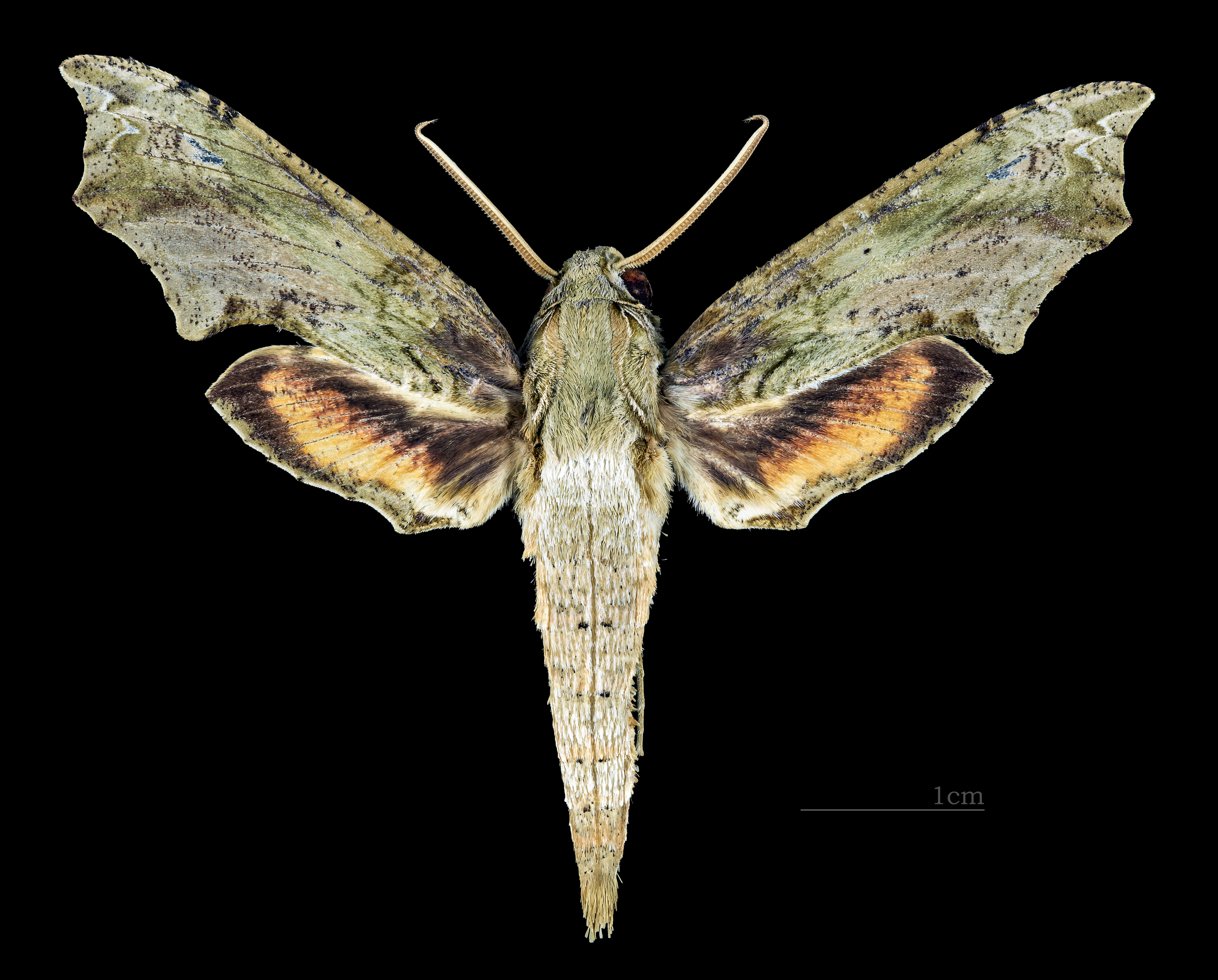
- Eupanacra splendens splendens male dorsal
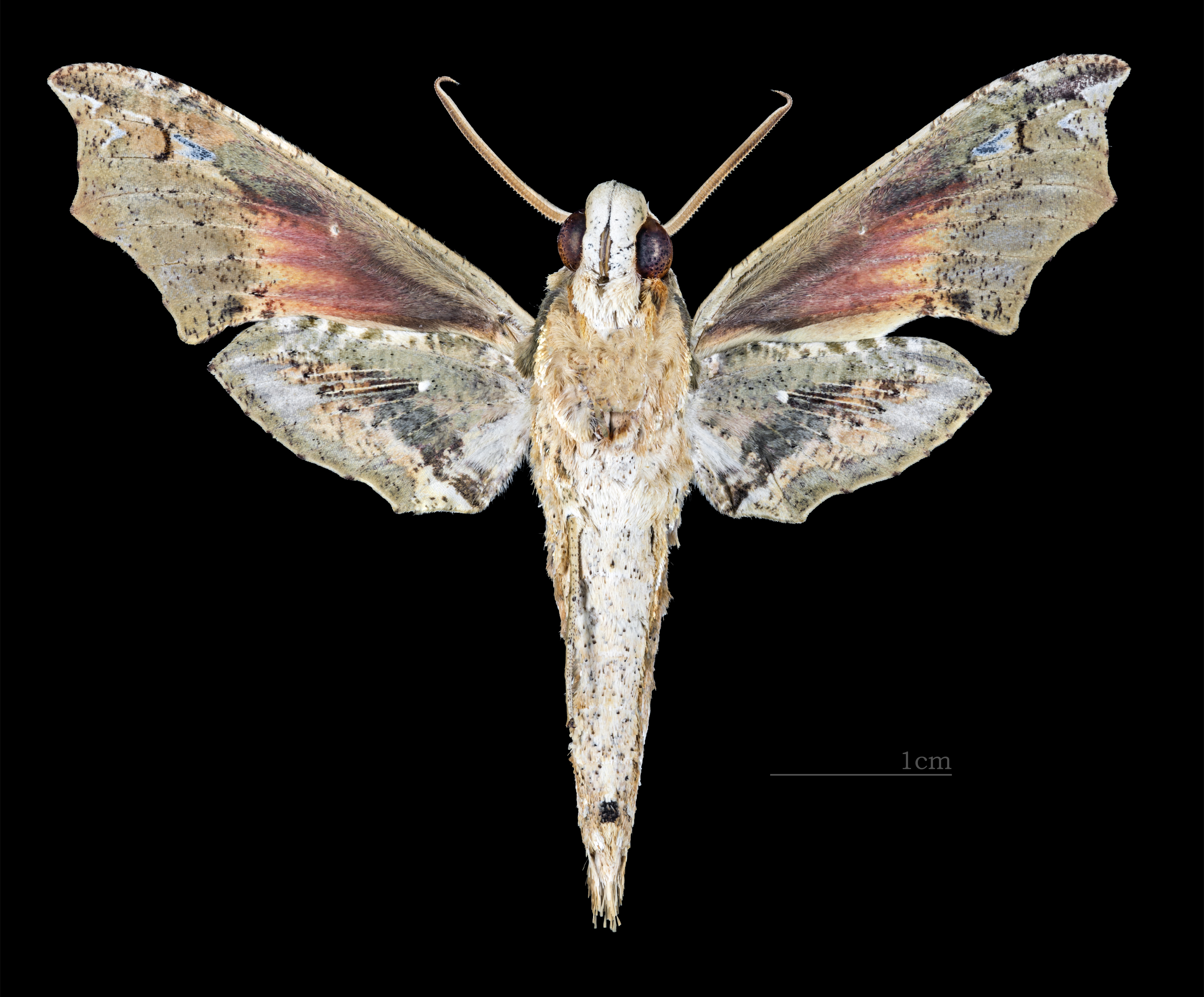
- Eupanacra splendens splendens male ventral

Scientific classification
- Kingdom: Animalia
- Phylum: Arthropoda
- Class: Insecta
- Order: Lepidoptera
- Family: Sphingidae
- Genus: Eupanacra
- Species: E. splendens

Binomial name
- Eupanacra splendens (Rothschild, 1894)

Synonyms
- Panacra splendens Rothschild, 1894; Panacra splendens salomonis Clark, 1920; Panacra splendens paradoxa Gehlen, 1932

= Eupanacra splendens =

Species of moth

Eupanacra splendens is a moth of the family Sphingidae.

== Distribution ==
It is known from the Moluccas, Papua New Guinea, the Solomon Islands and north-eastern Australia.

== Description ==
The wingspan is about 50 mm.

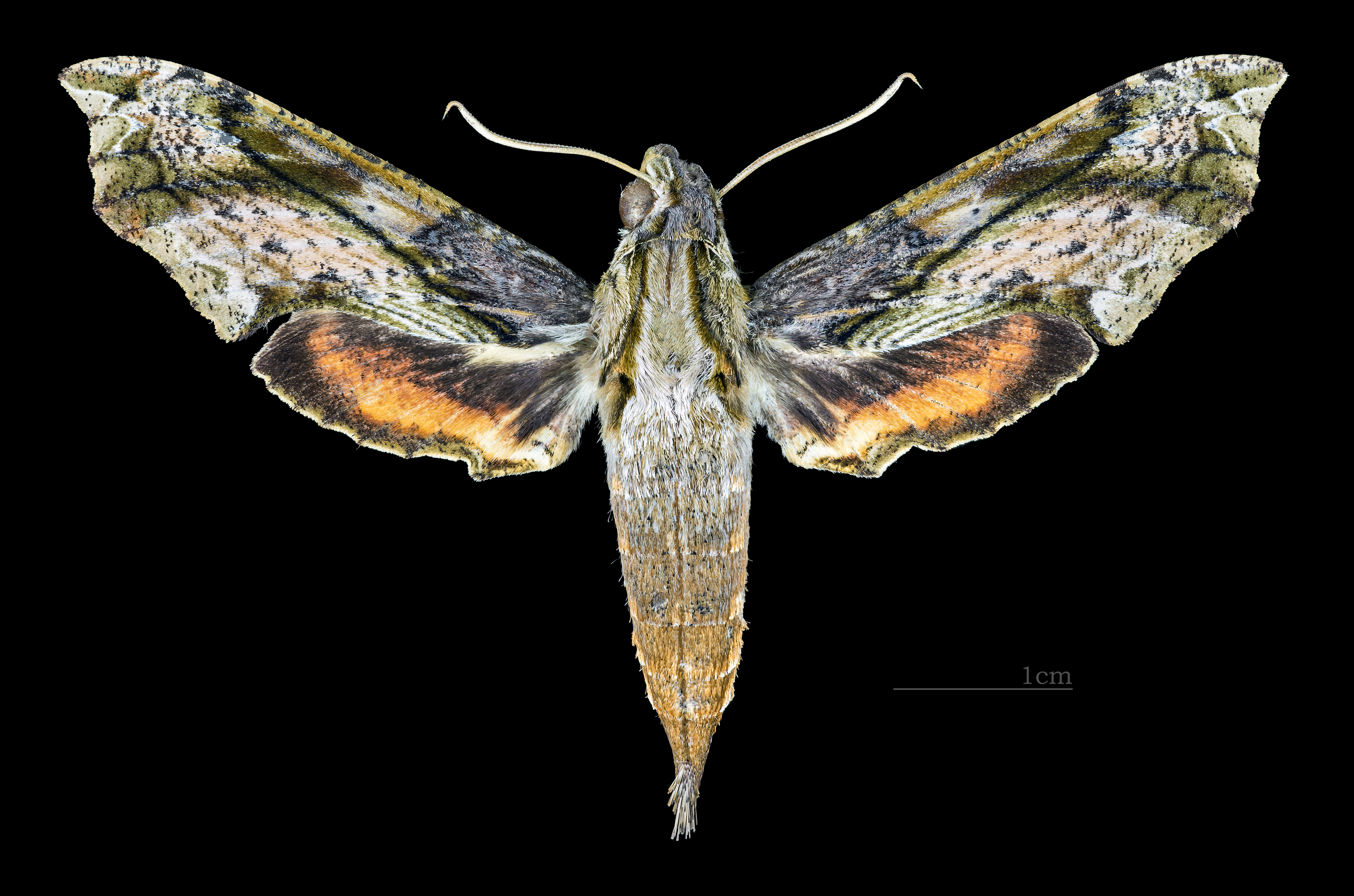
Female dorsal

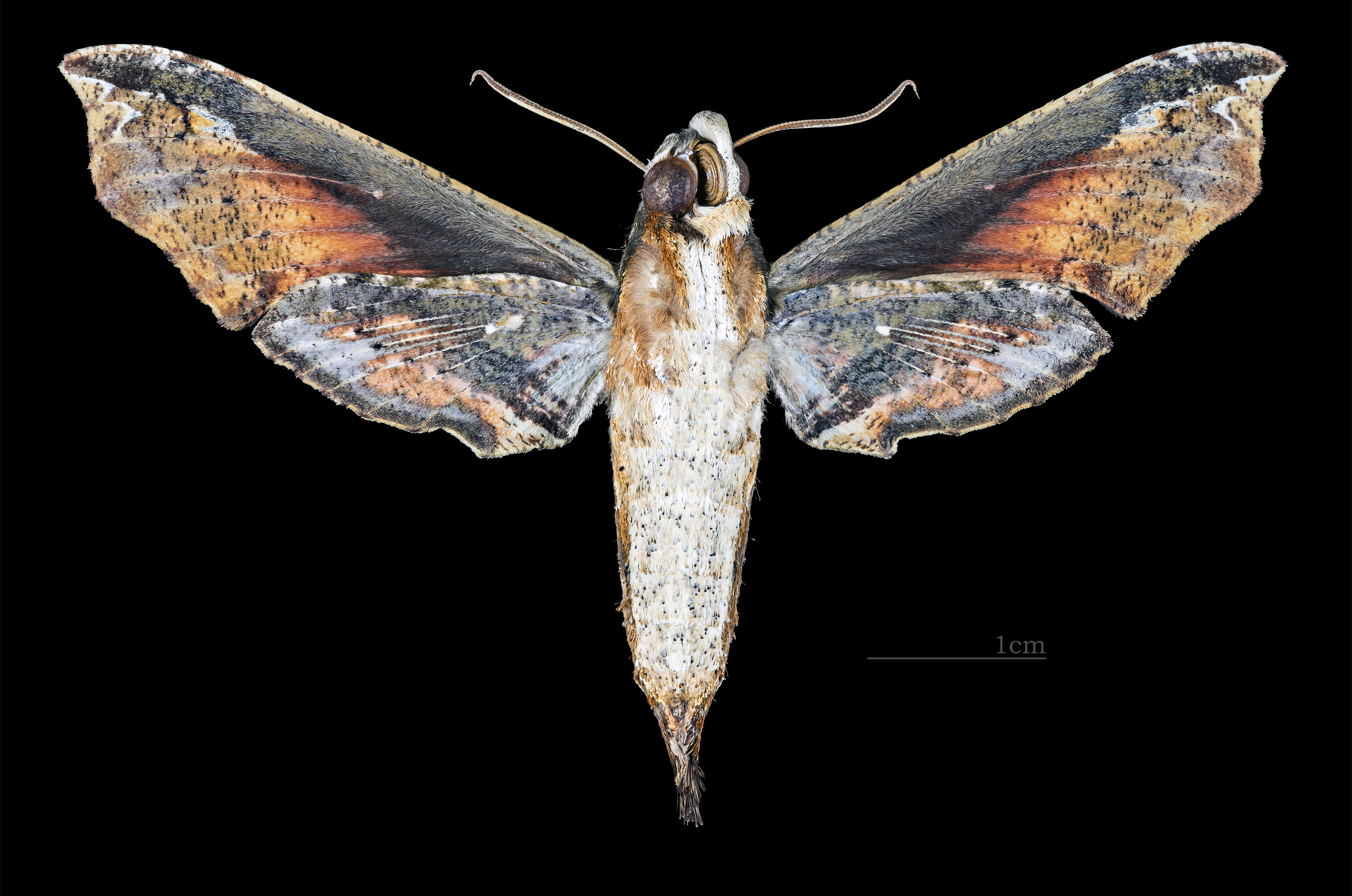
Female ventral

== Biology ==
Larvae have been recorded feeding on Epipremnum pinnatum.

== Subspecies ==
- Eupanacra splendens splendens (Moluccas (Halmahera, Buru, Ambon, Aru, Kai Islands), Papua New Guinea, Solomon Islands, north-eastern Australia)
- Eupanacra splendens paradoxa (Gehlen, 1932) (Moluccas)
