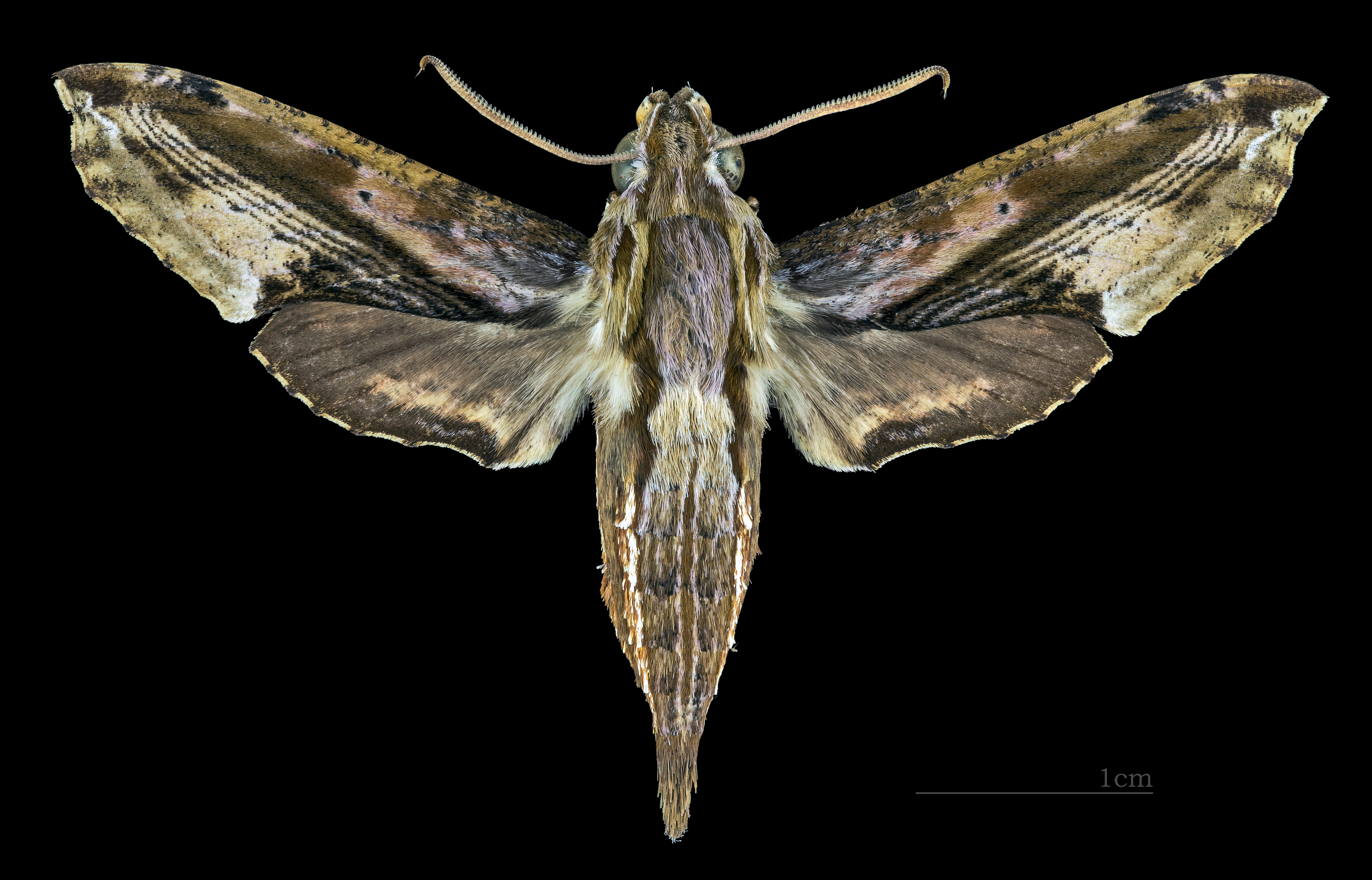
- Eupanacra radians

Scientific classification
- Kingdom: Animalia
- Phylum: Arthropoda
- Clade: Pancrustacea
- Class: Insecta
- Order: Lepidoptera
- Family: Sphingidae
- Tribe: Macroglossini
- Genus: Eupanacra; Cadiou & Holloway, 1989

Species
- See text

= Eupanacra =

Genus of moths

Eupanacra is a genus of moths in the family Sphingidae.

== Species ==
- Eupanacra angulata (Clark, 1923)
- Eupanacra automedon (Walker, 1856)
- Eupanacra busiris (Walker, 1856)
- Eupanacra cadioui Hogenes & Treadaway, 1993
- Eupanacra elegantulus (Herrich-Schaffer, 1856)
- Eupanacra greetae Cadiou & Holloway, 1989
- Eupanacra harmani Cadiou & Holloway, 1989
- Eupanacra hollowayi Tennent, 1991
- Eupanacra malayana (Rothschild & Jordan, 1903)
- Eupanacra metallica (Butler, 1875)
- Eupanacra micholitzi (Rothschild & Jordan, 1893)
- Eupanacra mindanaensis Brechlin, 2000
- Eupanacra mydon (Walker, 1856)
- Eupanacra perfecta (Butler, 1875)
- Eupanacra poulardi Cadiou & Holloway, 1989
- Eupanacra psaltria (Jordan, 1923)
- Eupanacra pulchella (Rothschild & Jordan, 1907)
- Eupanacra radians (Gehlen, 1930)
- Eupanacra regularis (Butler, 1875)
  - Eupanacra regularis continentalis (Gehlen, 1930)
- Eupanacra sinuata (Rothschild & Jordan, 1903)
- Eupanacra splendens (Rothschild, 1894)
  - Eupanacra splendens paradoxa (Gehlen, 1932)
- Eupanacra tiridates (Boisduval, 1875)
- Eupanacra treadawayi Cadiou, 1995
- Eupanacra variolosa (Walker, 1956)
- Eupanacra waloensis Brechlin, 2000
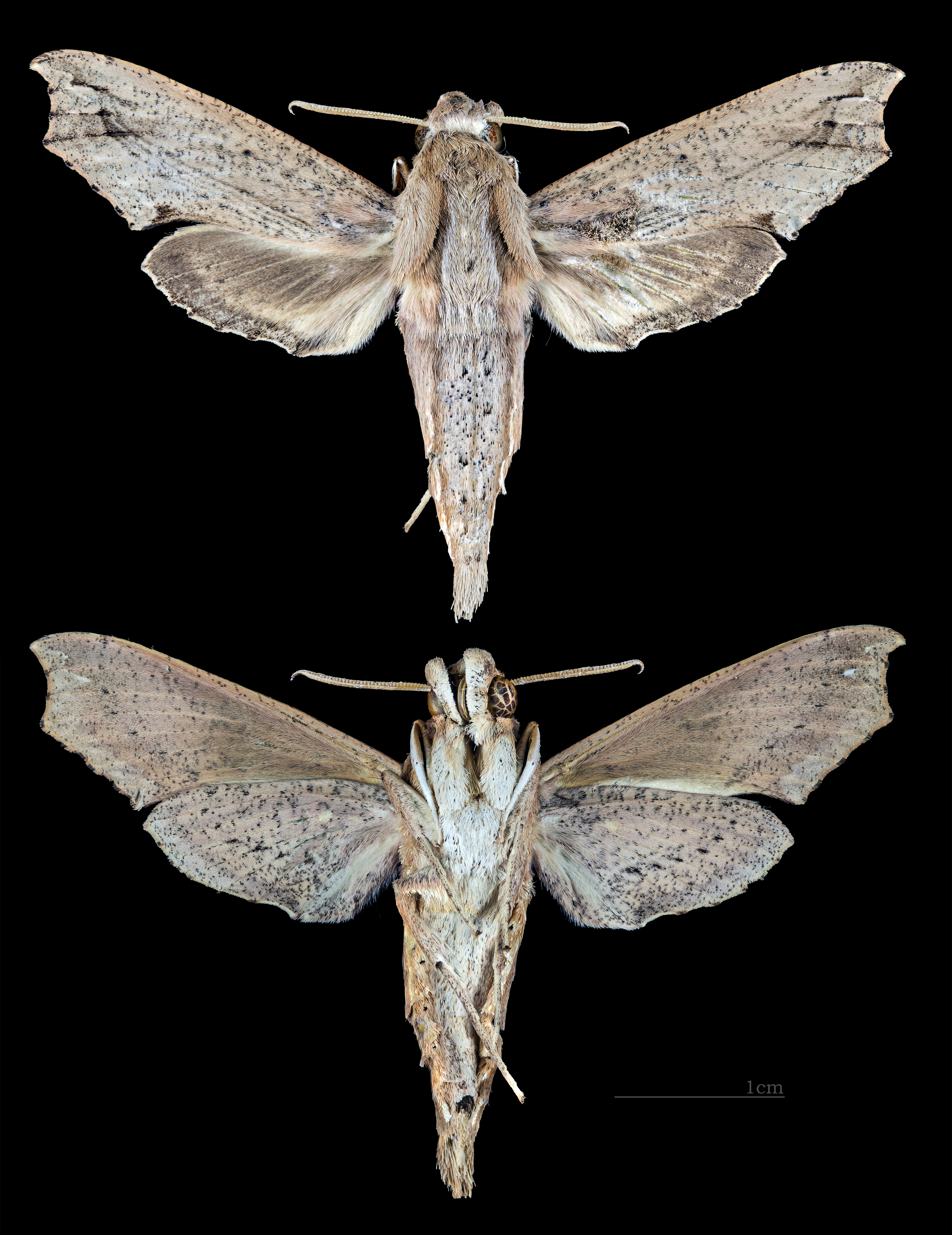
Eupanacra automedon

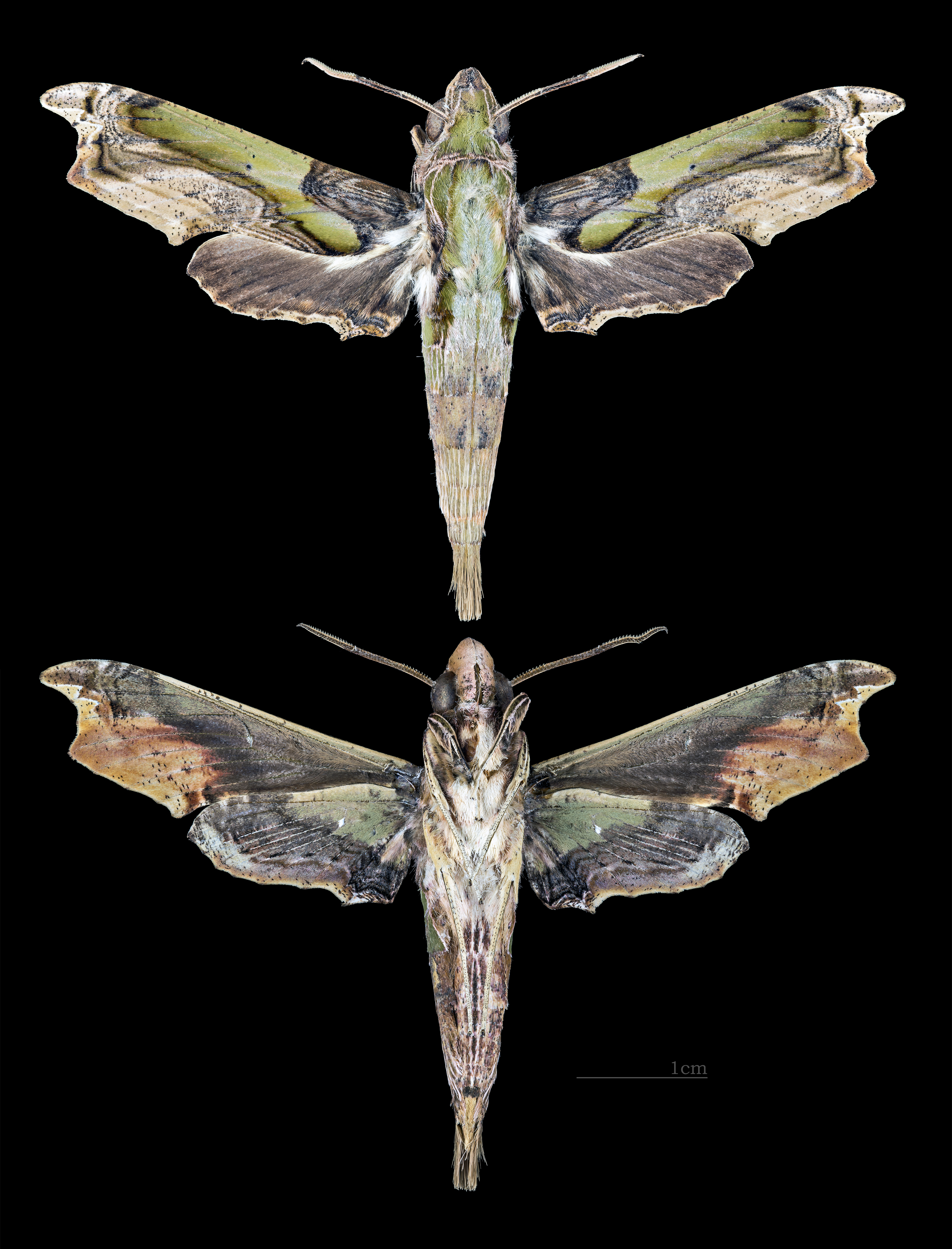
Eupanacra busiris

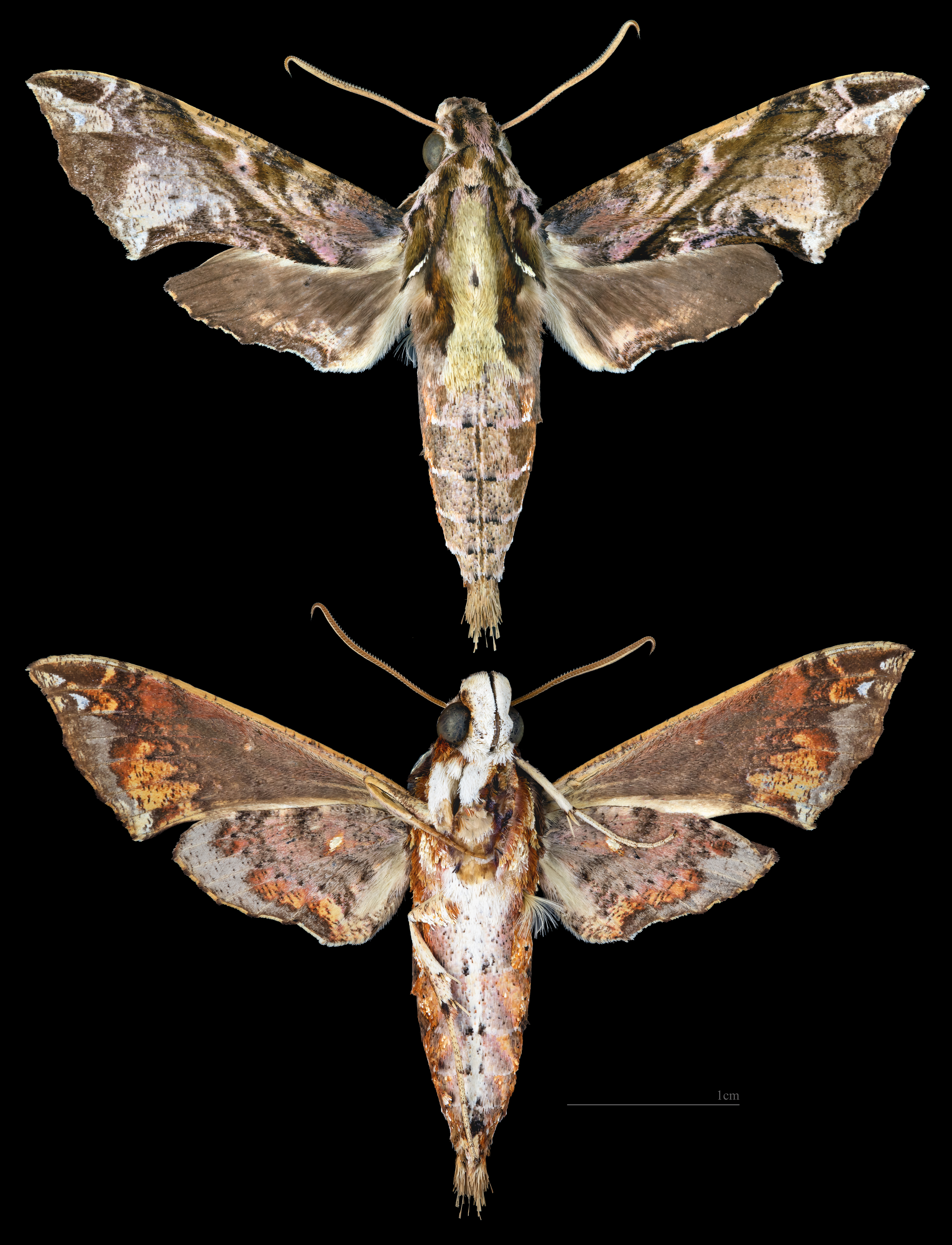
Eupanacra elegantulus

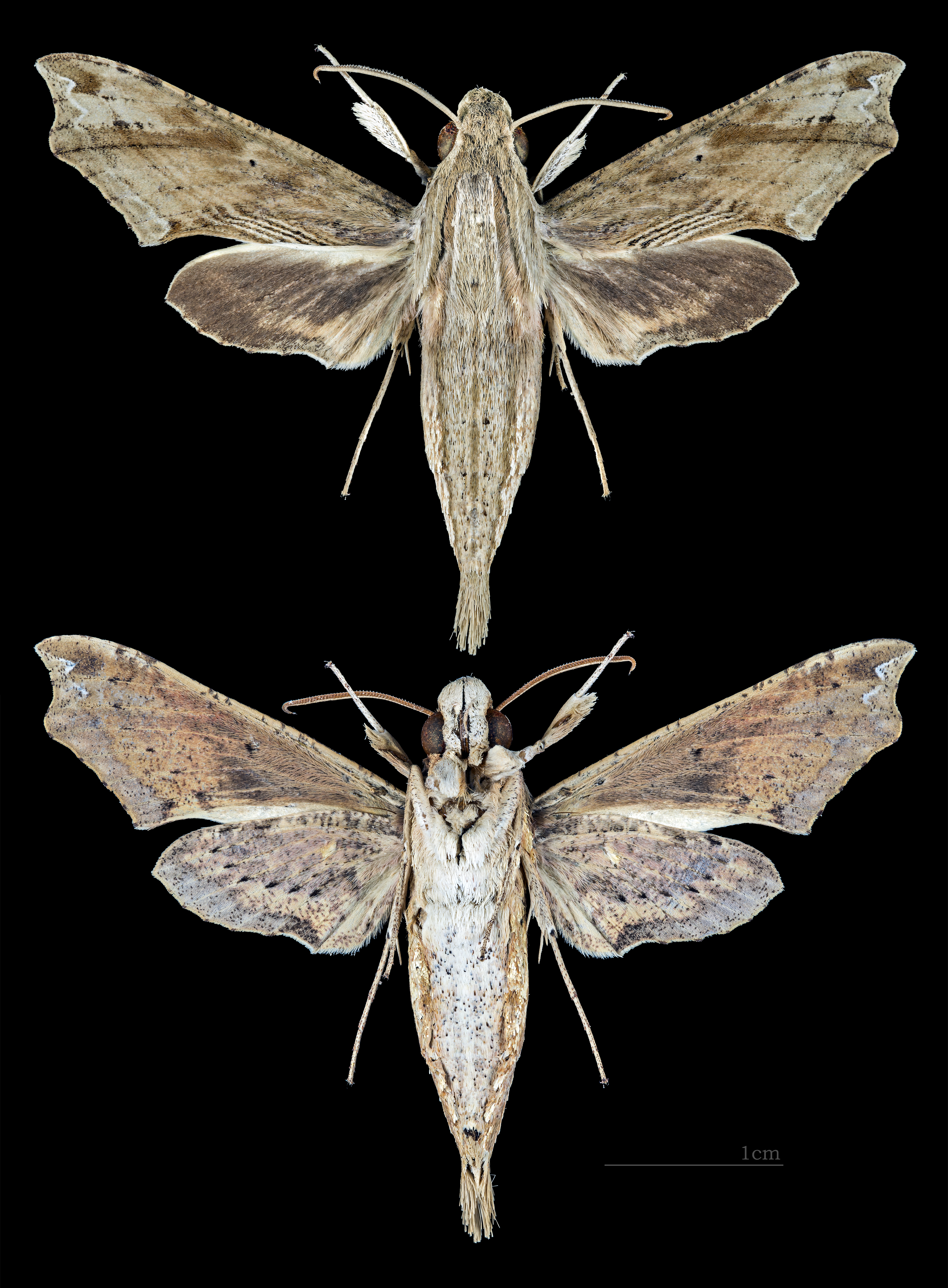
Eupanacra malayana

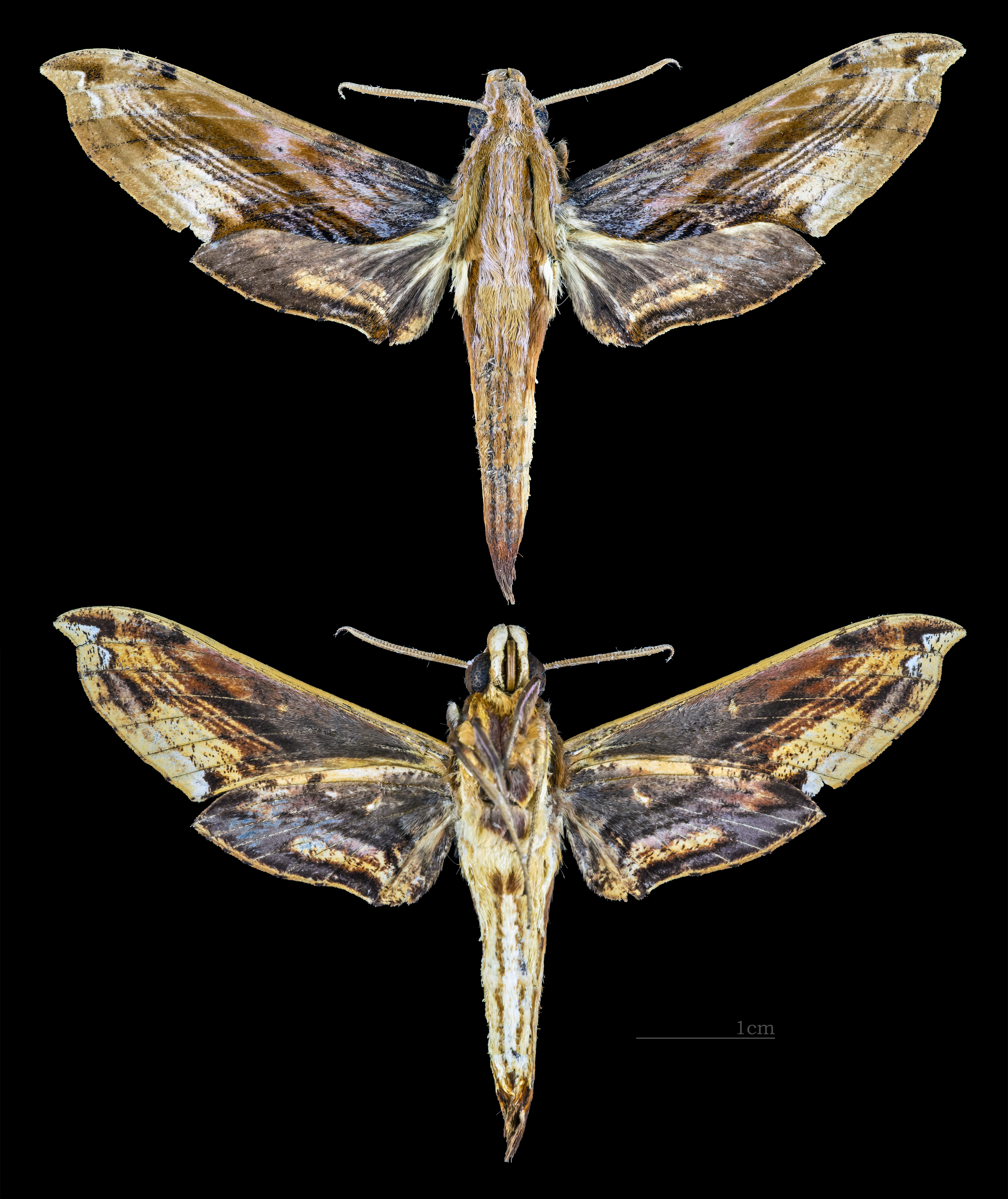
Eupanacra metallica

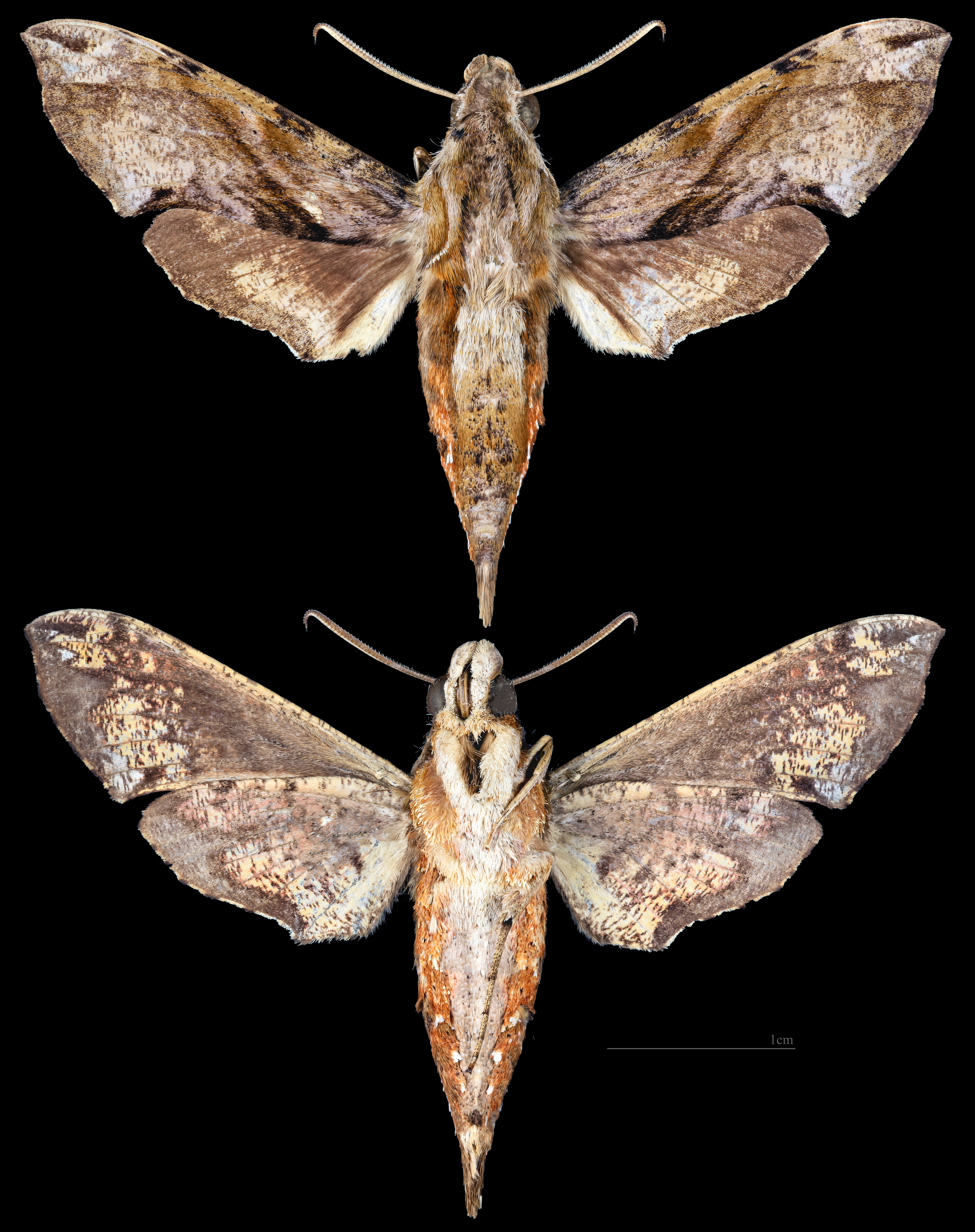
Eupanacra mydon

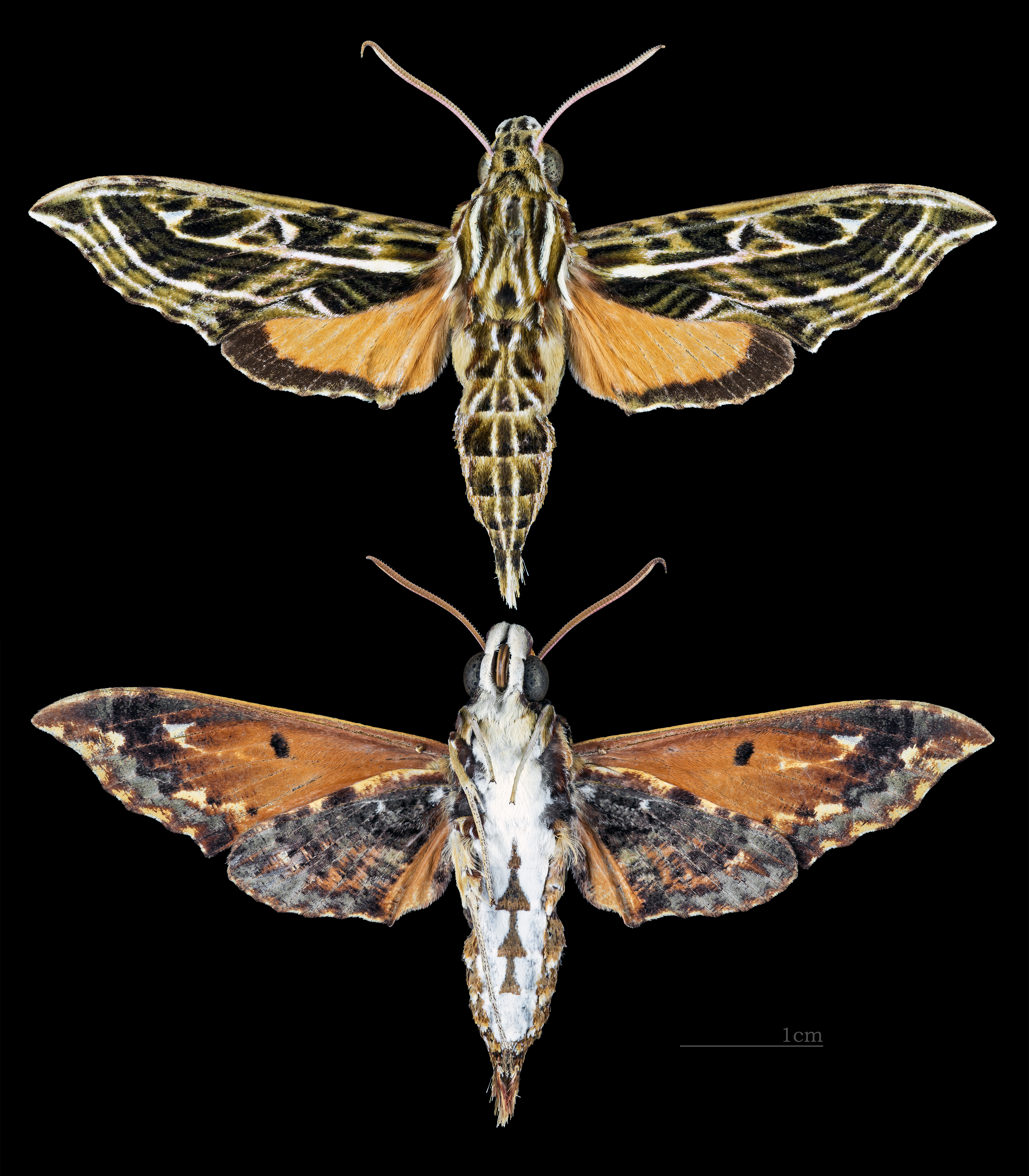
Eupanacra pulchella

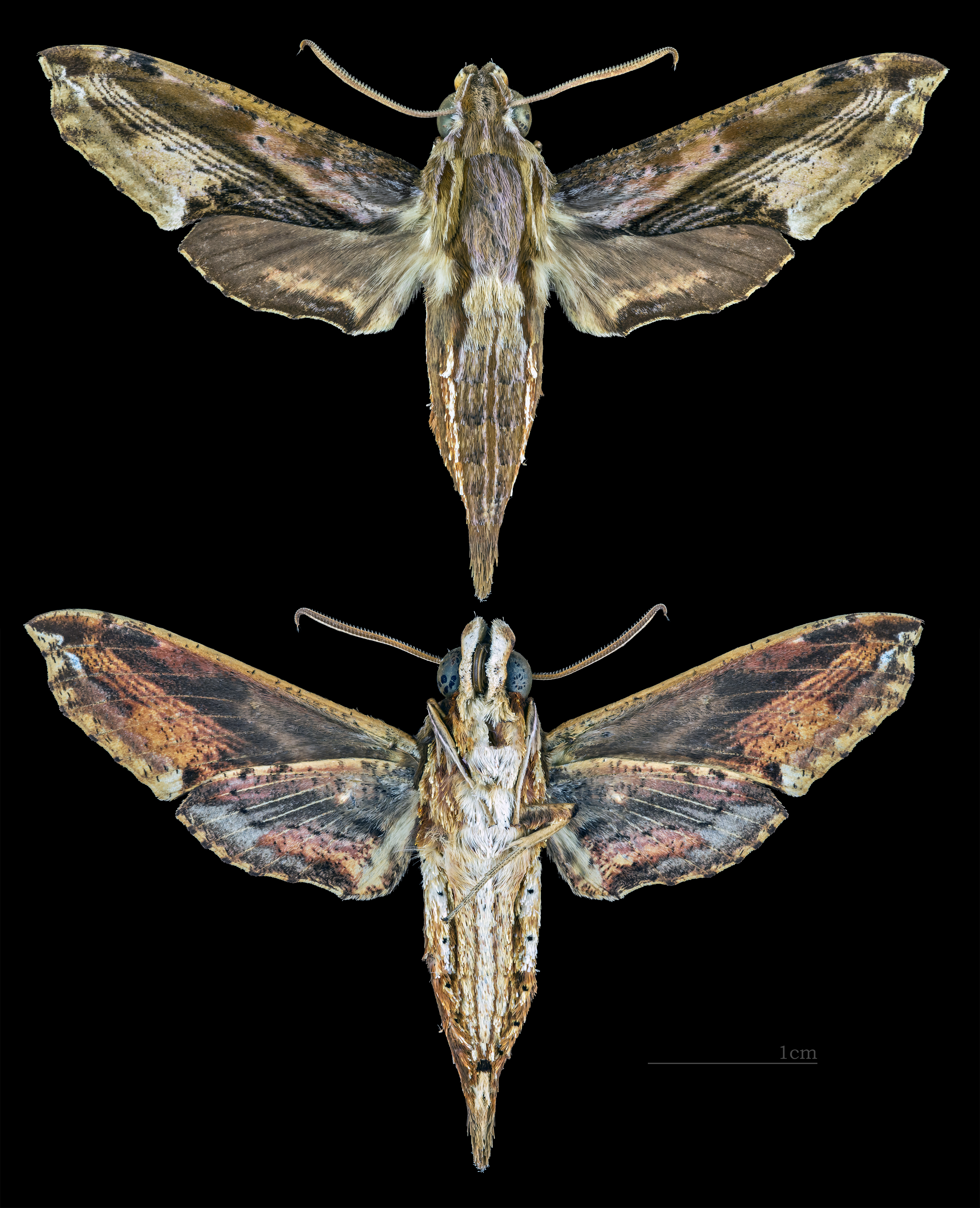
Eupanacra radians

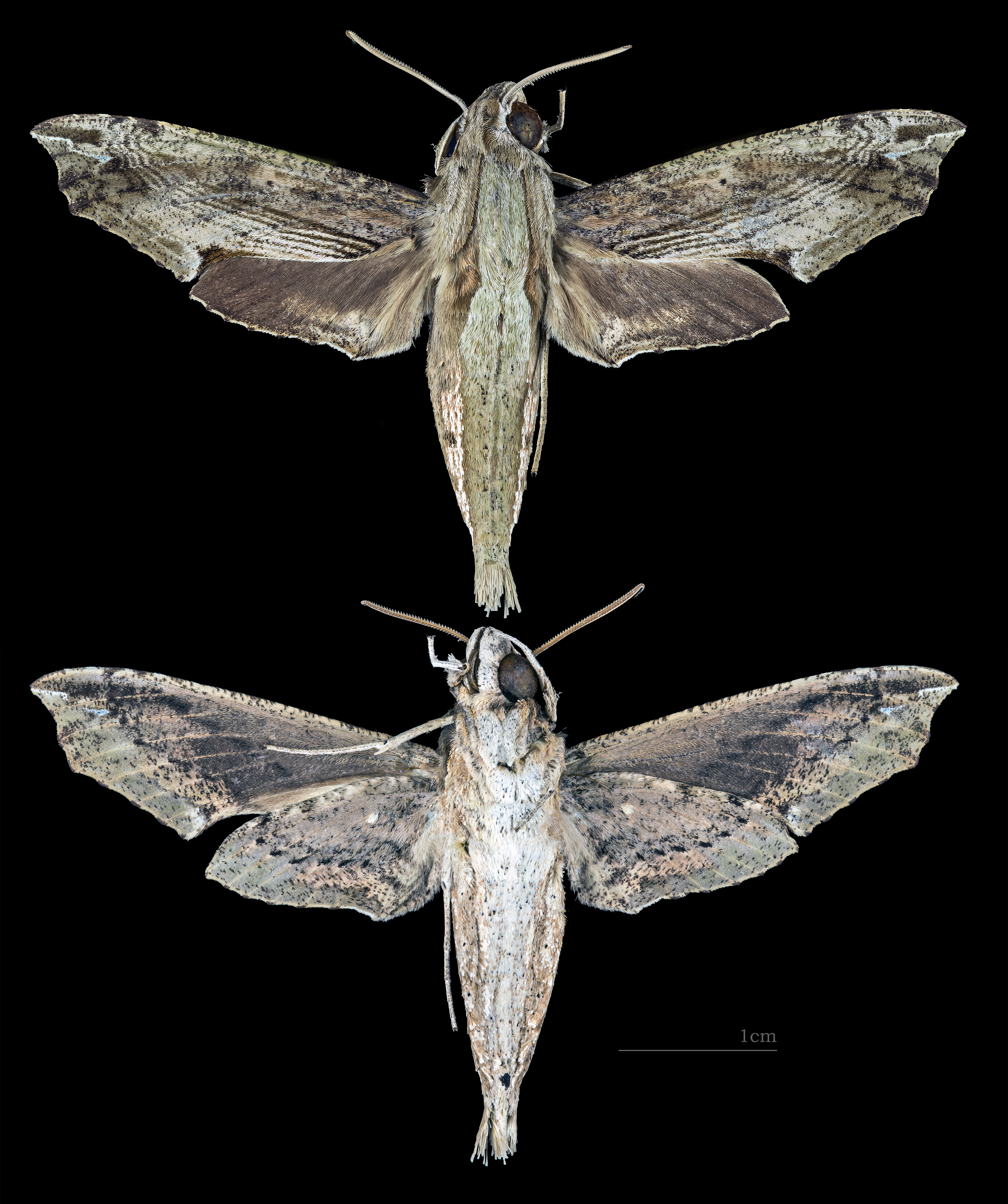
Eupanacra regularis

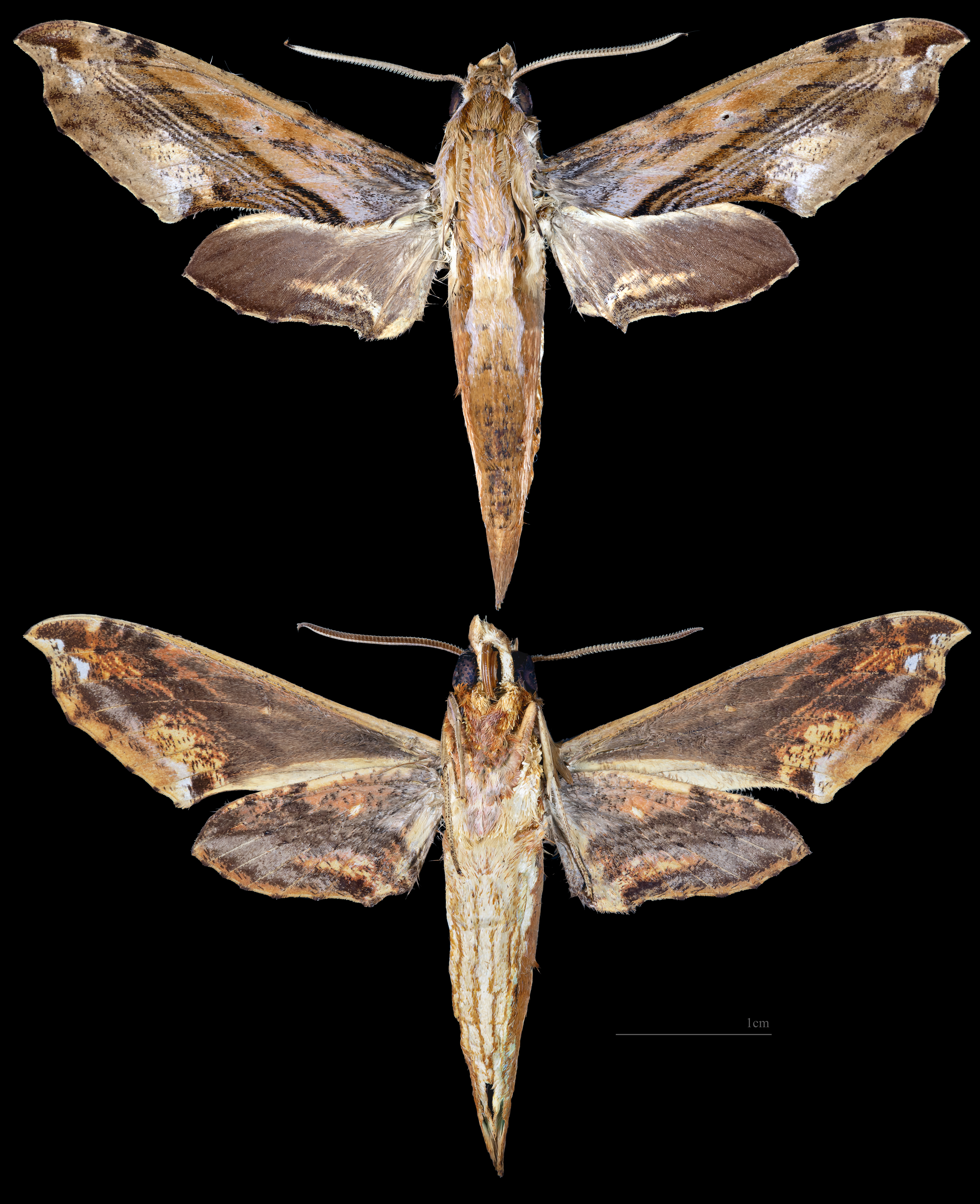
Eupanacra sinuata

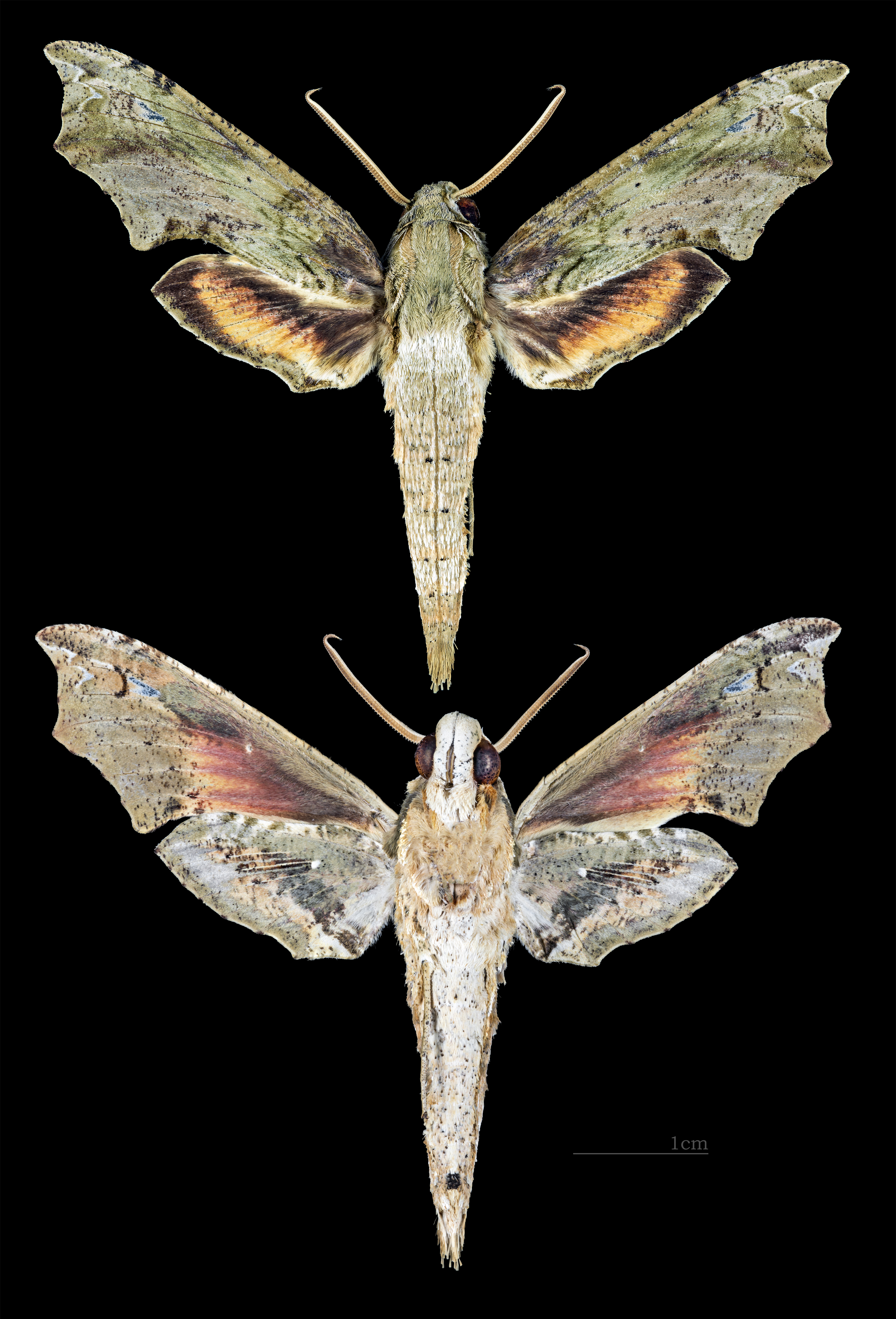
Eupanacra splendens

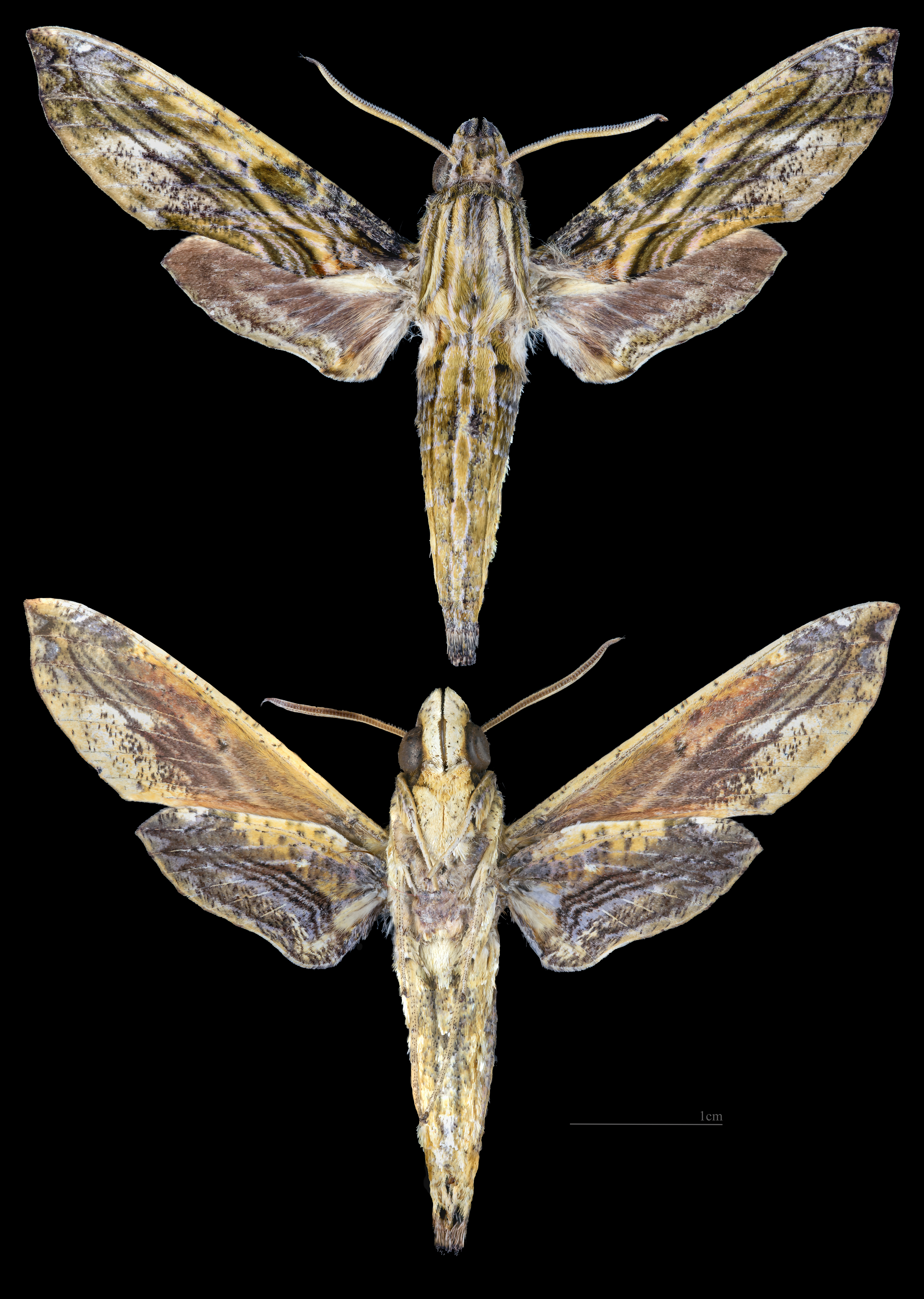
Eupanacra variolosa
