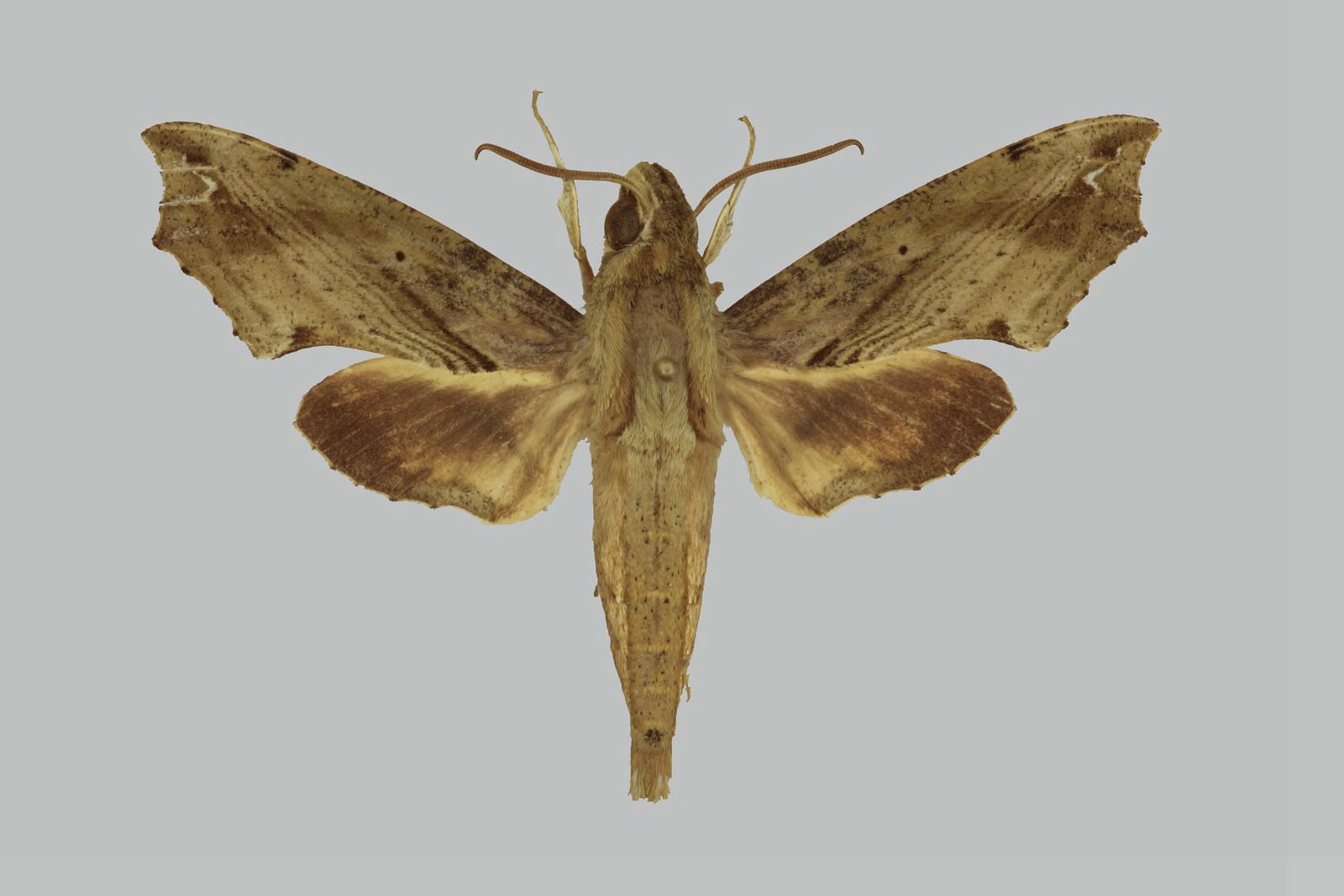

Scientific classification
- Kingdom: Animalia
- Phylum: Arthropoda
- Clade: Pancrustacea
- Class: Insecta
- Order: Lepidoptera
- Family: Sphingidae
- Genus: Eupanacra
- Species: E. greetae

Binomial name
- Eupanacra greetae Cadiou & Holloway, 1989

= Eupanacra greetae =

Species of moth

Eupanacra greetae is a moth of the family Sphingidae. It is known from Sulawesi.
