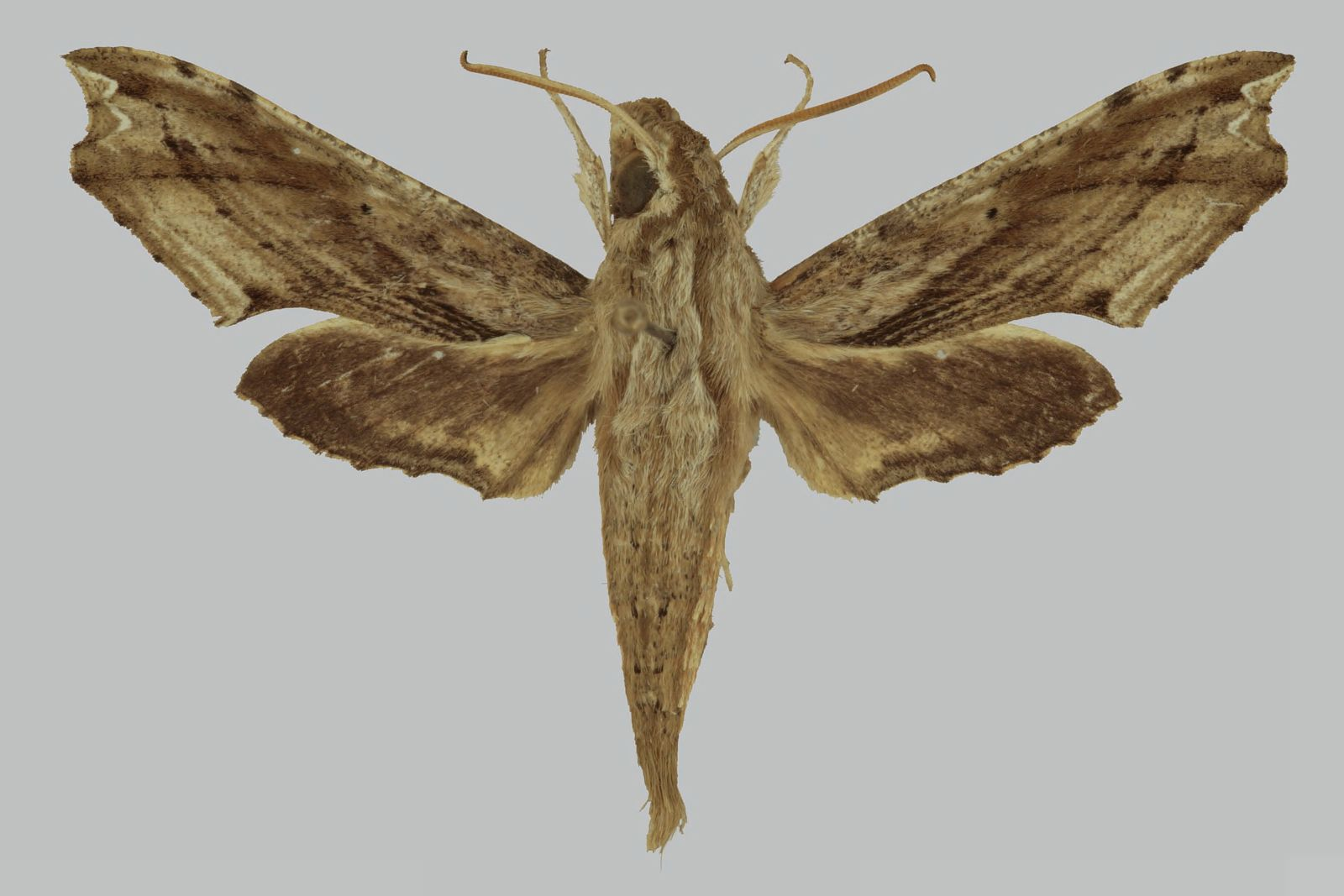

Scientific classification
- Kingdom: Animalia
- Phylum: Arthropoda
- Clade: Pancrustacea
- Class: Insecta
- Order: Lepidoptera
- Family: Sphingidae
- Genus: Eupanacra
- Species: E. waloensis

Binomial name
- Eupanacra waloensis Brechlin, 2000

= Eupanacra waloensis =

Species of moth

Eupanacra waloensis is a moth of the family Sphingidae. It is known from Yunnan in China.

The length of the forewings is 20–23 mm.
