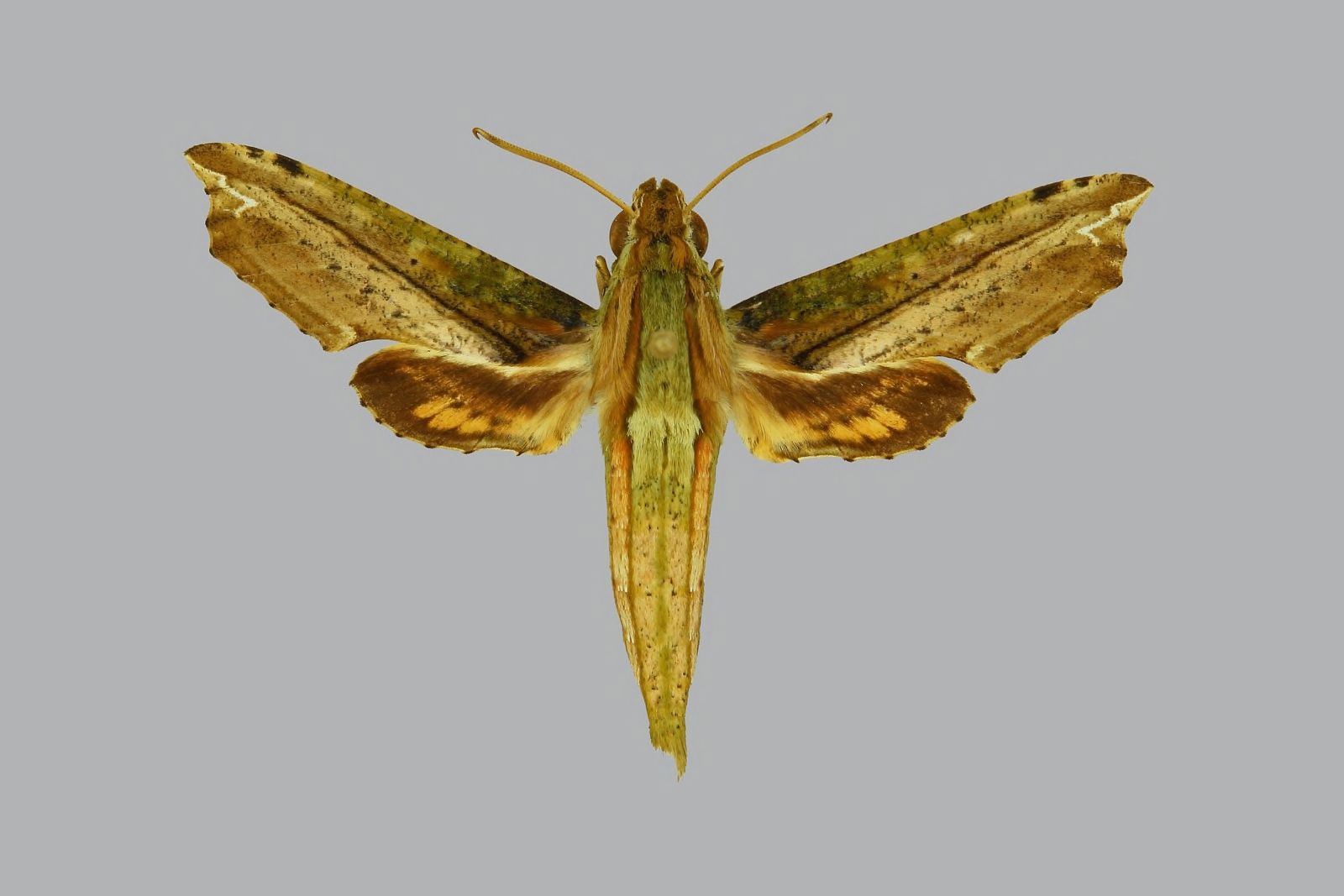

Scientific classification
- Kingdom: Animalia
- Phylum: Arthropoda
- Class: Insecta
- Order: Lepidoptera
- Family: Sphingidae
- Genus: Eupanacra
- Species: E. hollowayi

Binomial name
- Eupanacra hollowayi Tennent, 1991

Synonyms
- Eupanacra hogenesi Haxaire, 1993

= Eupanacra hollowayi =

Species of moth

Eupanacra hollowayi is a moth of the family Sphingidae. It is known from south-east Asia, including Malaysia, Borneo and Thailand.
