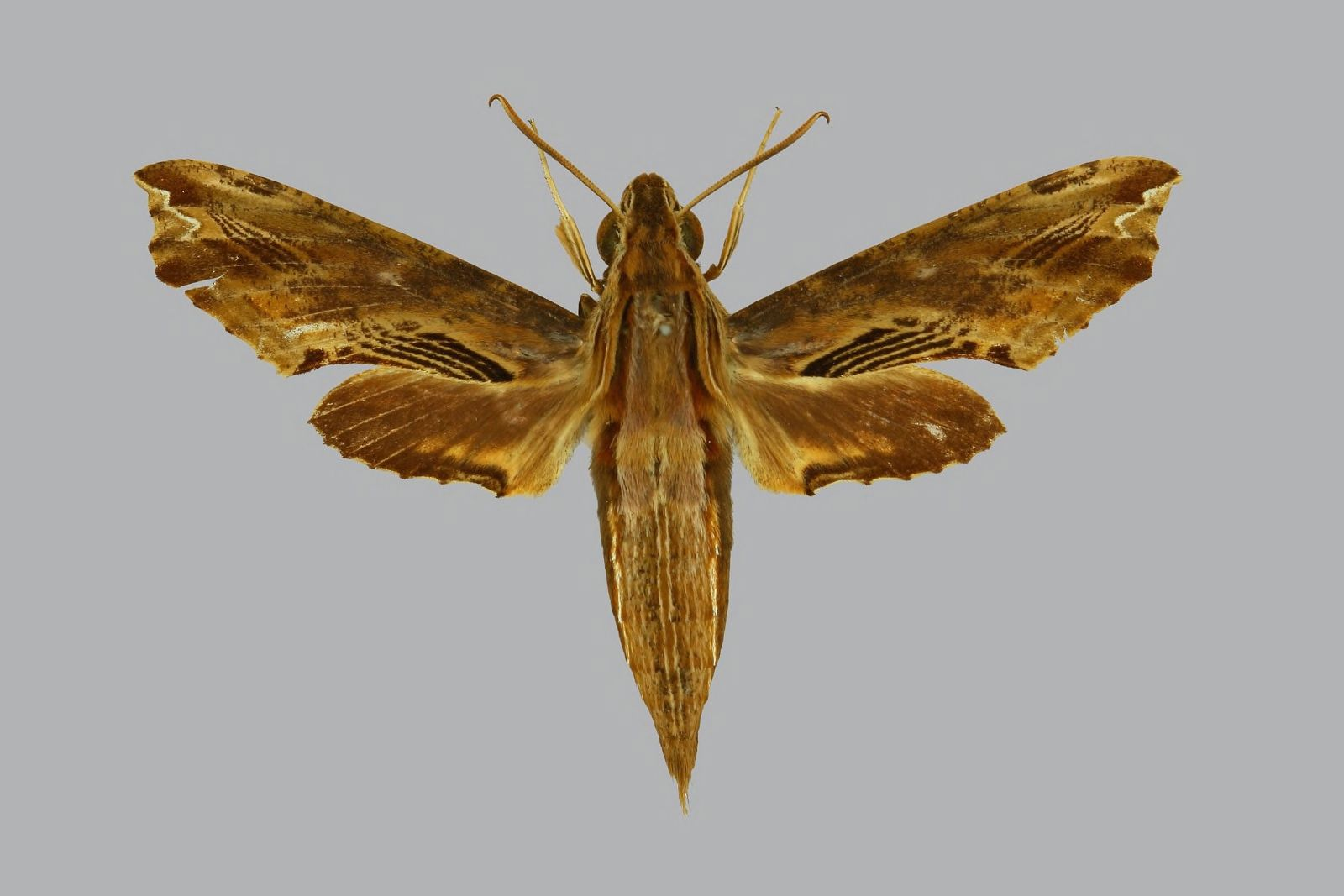

Scientific classification
- Kingdom: Animalia
- Phylum: Arthropoda
- Class: Insecta
- Order: Lepidoptera
- Family: Sphingidae
- Genus: Eupanacra
- Species: E. psaltria

Binomial name
- Eupanacra psaltria (Jordan, 1923)

Synonyms
- Panacra psaltria Jordan, 1923

= Eupanacra psaltria =

Species of moth

Eupanacra psaltria is a moth of the family Sphingidae. It is known from Borneo.
