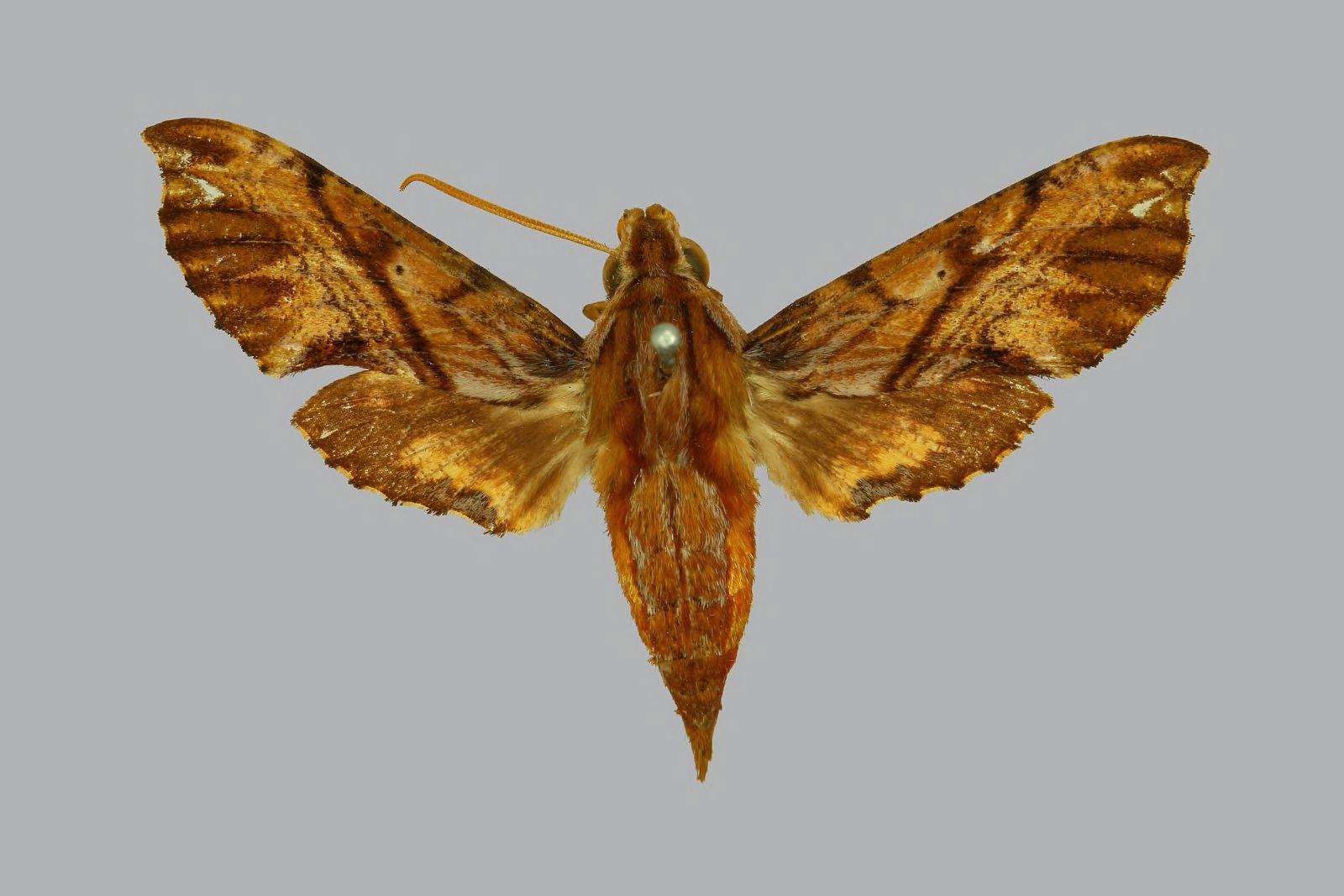

Scientific classification
- Kingdom: Animalia
- Phylum: Arthropoda
- Class: Insecta
- Order: Lepidoptera
- Family: Sphingidae
- Genus: Eupanacra
- Species: E. angulata

Binomial name
- Eupanacra angulata (Clark, 1923)

Synonyms
- Panacra angulata Clark, 1923

= Eupanacra angulata =

Species of moth

Eupanacra angulata is a moth of the family Sphingidae. It is known from Sumatra.

The forewing upperside is brown with darker brown margins. The prominent postmedian band continuous from the inner margin to the costa. There is a large, irregular, triangular area on the outer margin emphasized by darker scaling. The hindwing upperside is brown, with a broad median band which is very diffuse on its proximal edge. There is blue scaling along the outer margin.

== Etymology ==
It is named for the prominent line that arises at right angles to the costa, crosses the discal cell to Cu where it turns approximately 90° basad to run to the inner margin.
