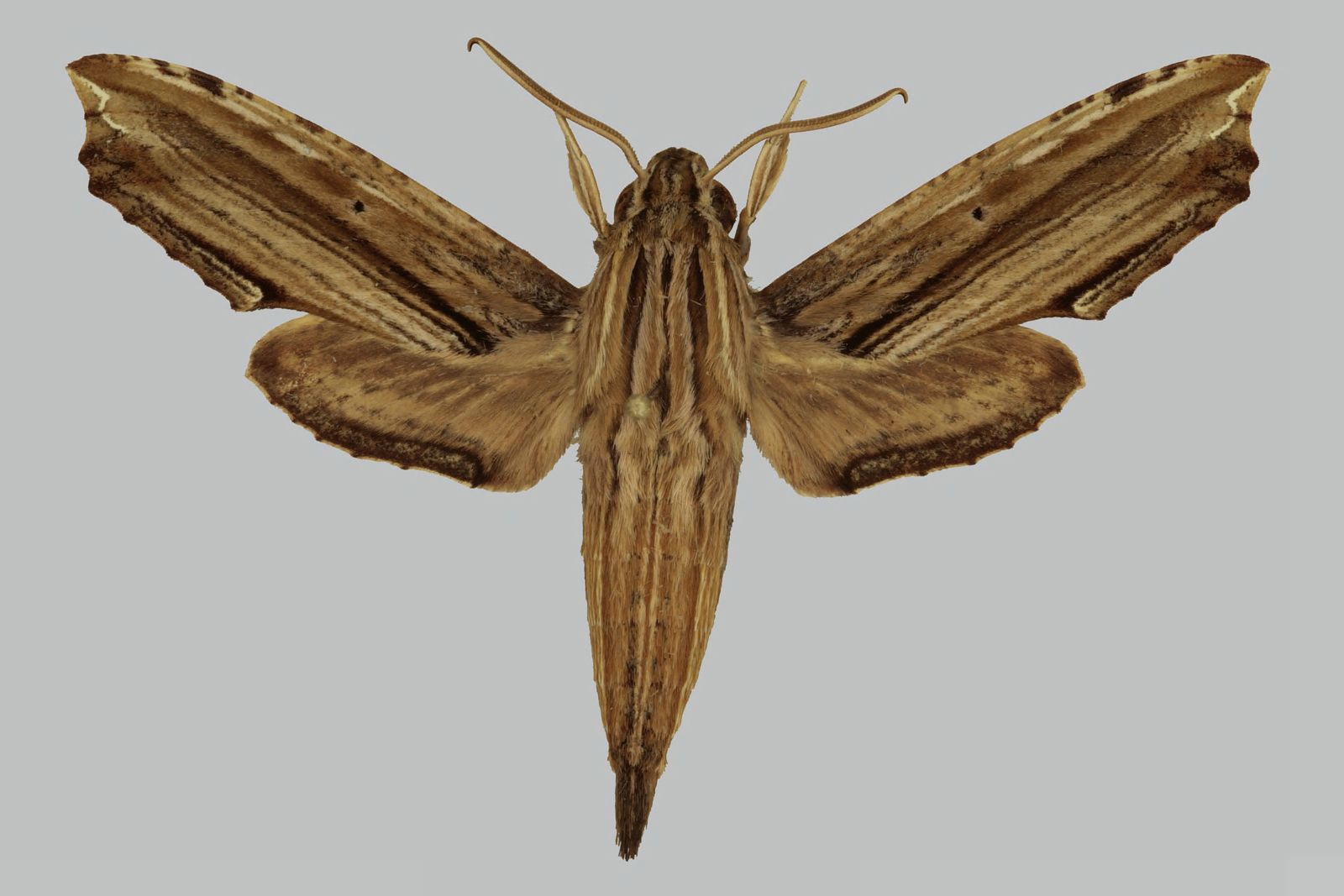

Scientific classification
- Kingdom: Animalia
- Phylum: Arthropoda
- Class: Insecta
- Order: Lepidoptera
- Family: Sphingidae
- Genus: Eupanacra
- Species: E. cadioui

Binomial name
- Eupanacra cadioui Hogenes & Treadaway, 1993

= Eupanacra cadioui =

Species of moth

Eupanacra cadioui is a moth of the family Sphingidae. It is known from the Philippines.
