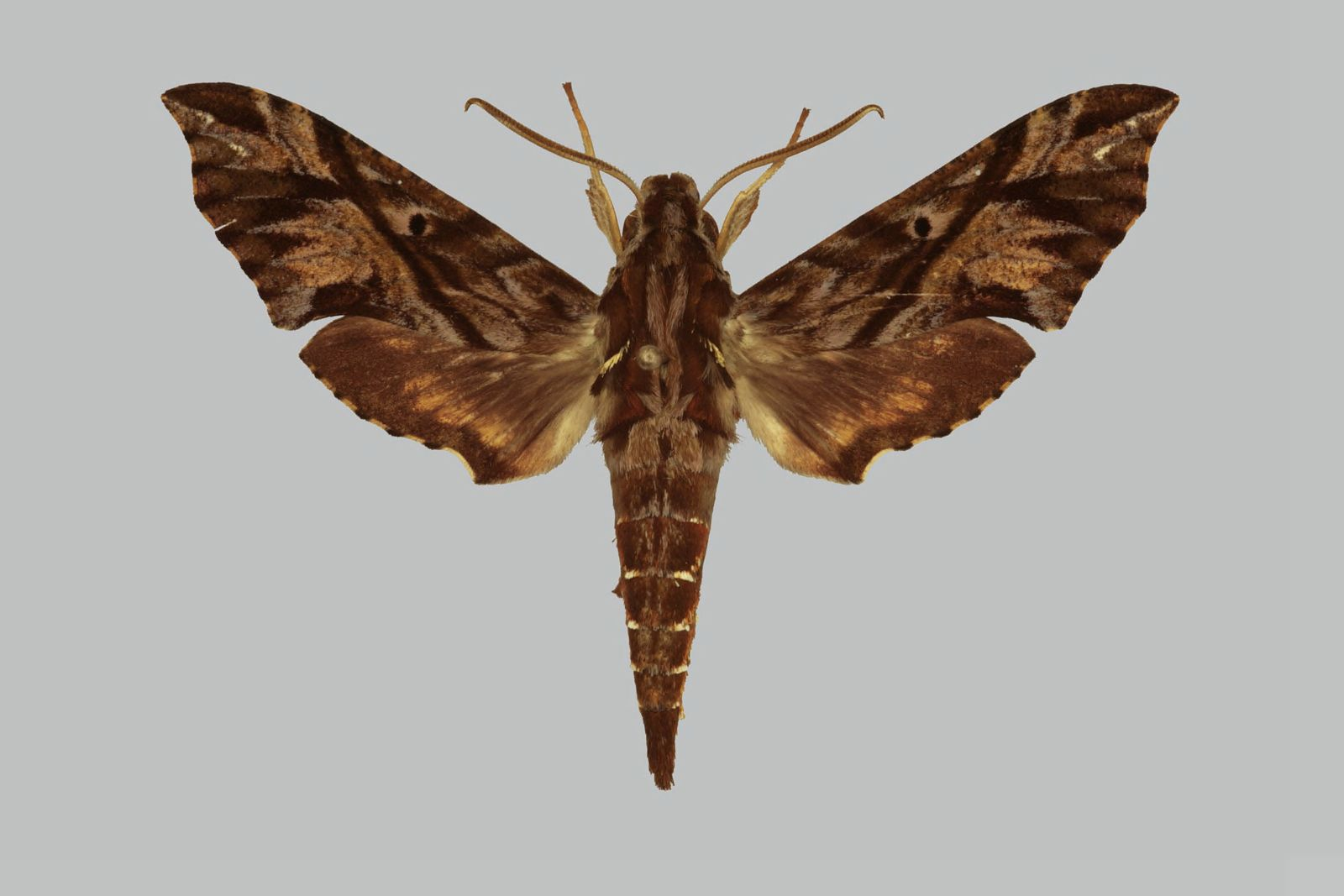

Scientific classification
- Kingdom: Animalia
- Phylum: Arthropoda
- Clade: Pancrustacea
- Class: Insecta
- Order: Lepidoptera
- Family: Sphingidae
- Genus: Eupanacra
- Species: E. treadawayi

Binomial name
- Eupanacra treadawayi Cadiou, 1995

= Eupanacra treadawayi =

Species of moth

Eupanacra treadawayi is a moth of the family Sphingidae. It is known from the Philippines.

The length of the forewings is 26.5–28 mm.
