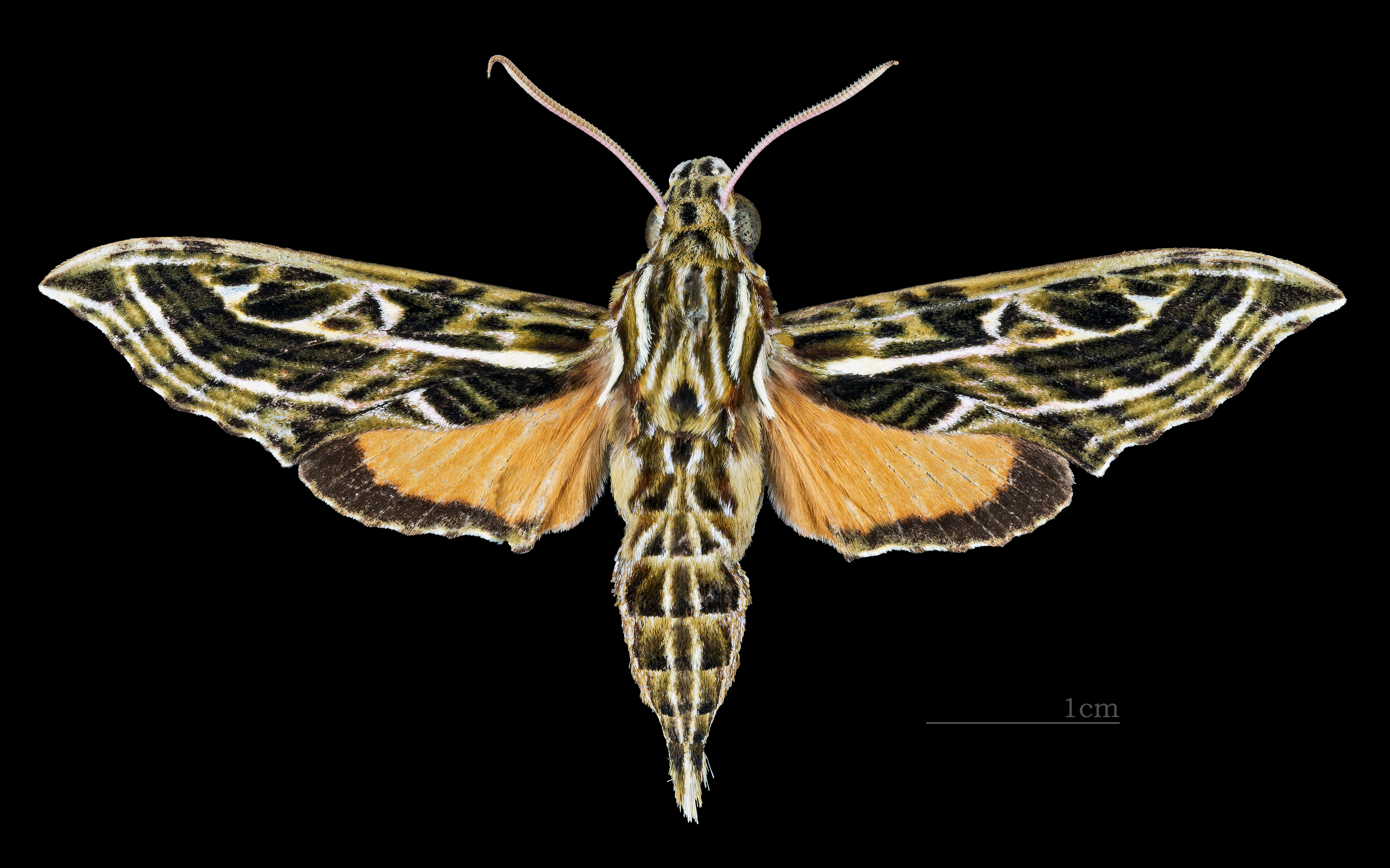
- Eupanacra pulchella Male dorsal
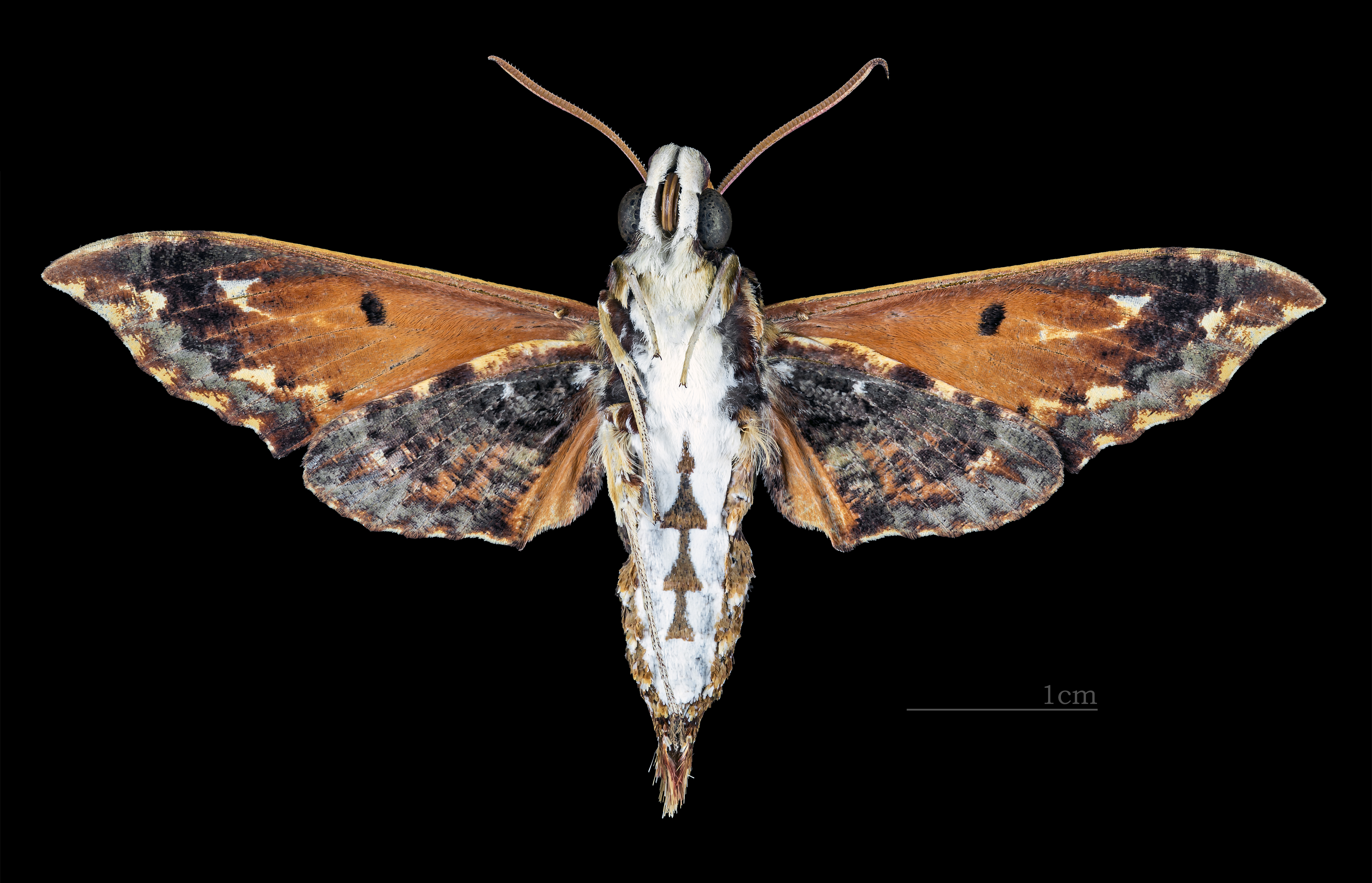
- Eupanacra pulchella Male ventral

Scientific classification
- Kingdom: Animalia
- Phylum: Arthropoda
- Class: Insecta
- Order: Lepidoptera
- Family: Sphingidae
- Genus: Eupanacra
- Species: E. pulchella

Binomial name
- Eupanacra pulchella (Rothschild & Jordan, 1907)

Synonyms
- Panacra pulchella Rothschild & Jordan, 1907

= Eupanacra pulchella =

Species of moth

Eupanacra pulchella is a moth of the family Sphingidae. It is known from Papua New Guinea.

It is similar to Eupanacra micholitzi. Adults have a dark forewing upperside with yellow stripes and an orange hindwing upperside with a dark marginal band. There is a conspicuous discal spot on the forewing underside. The hindwing underside has a pale red inner margin.
