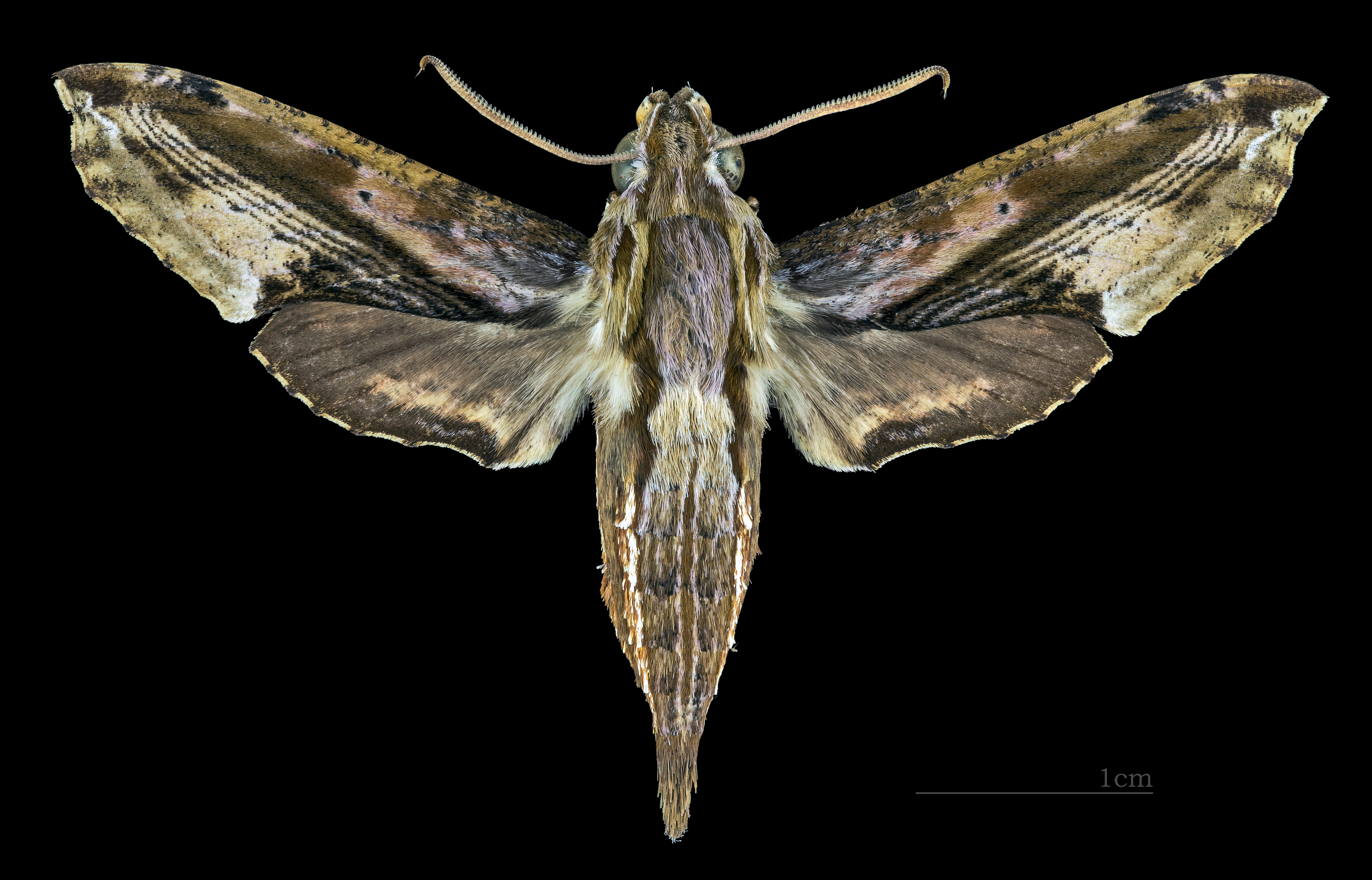
- Eupanacra radians Dorsal (MHNT)
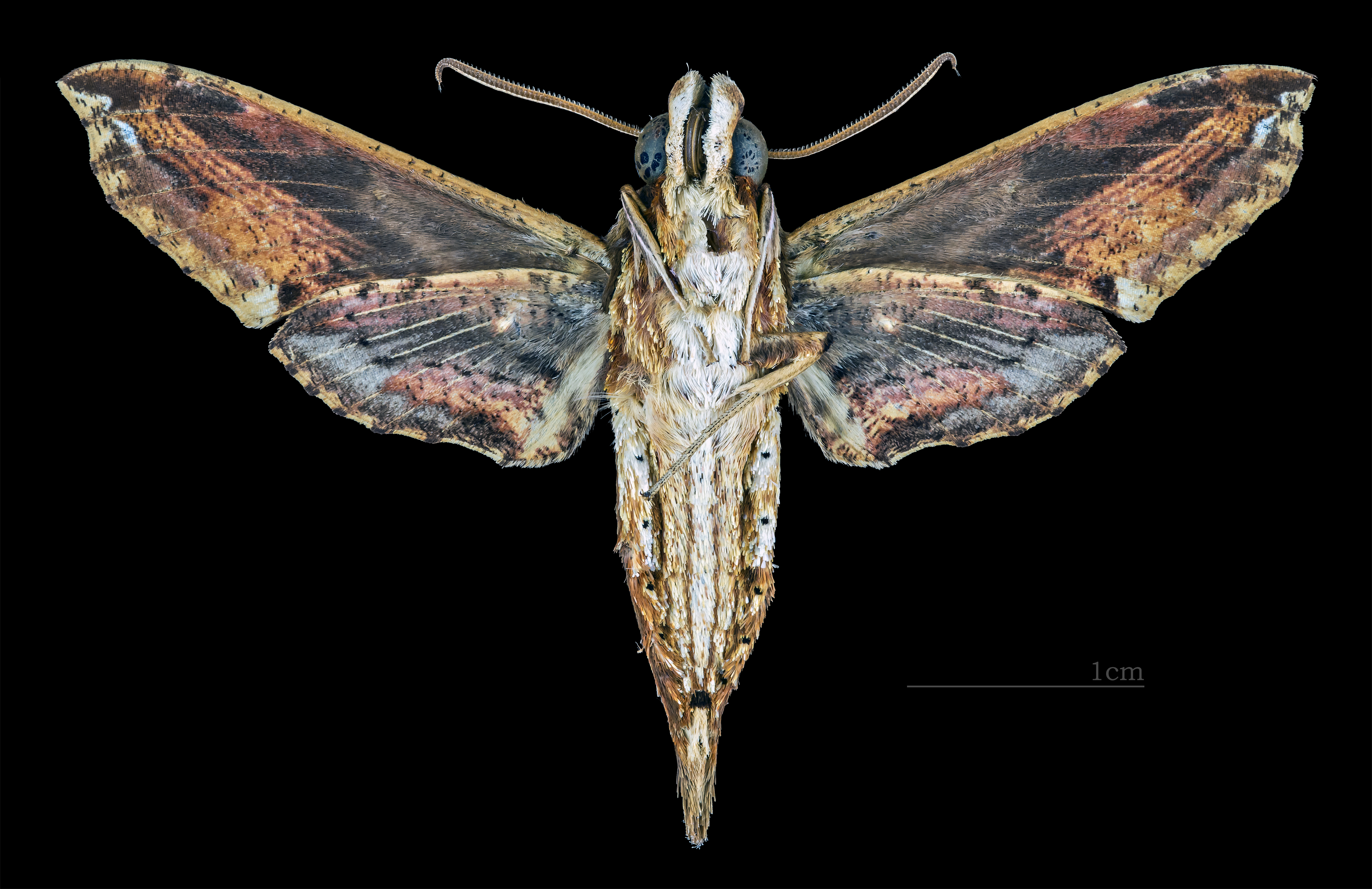
- Eupanacra radians ventral (MHNT)

Scientific classification
- Kingdom: Animalia
- Phylum: Arthropoda
- Class: Insecta
- Order: Lepidoptera
- Family: Sphingidae
- Genus: Eupanacra
- Species: E. radians

Binomial name
- Eupanacra radians (Gehlen, 1930)

Synonyms
- Panacra radians Gehlen, 1930

= Eupanacra radians =

Species of moth

Eupanacra radians is a moth of the family Sphingidae. It is known from Sumatra.

The length of the forewings is about 24.5 mm. It is similar to Eupanacra sinuata, but smaller, with a clearer pattern and narrower hindwings. The outer half of the underside of the forewings is reddish brown and the inner half is dark brown.
