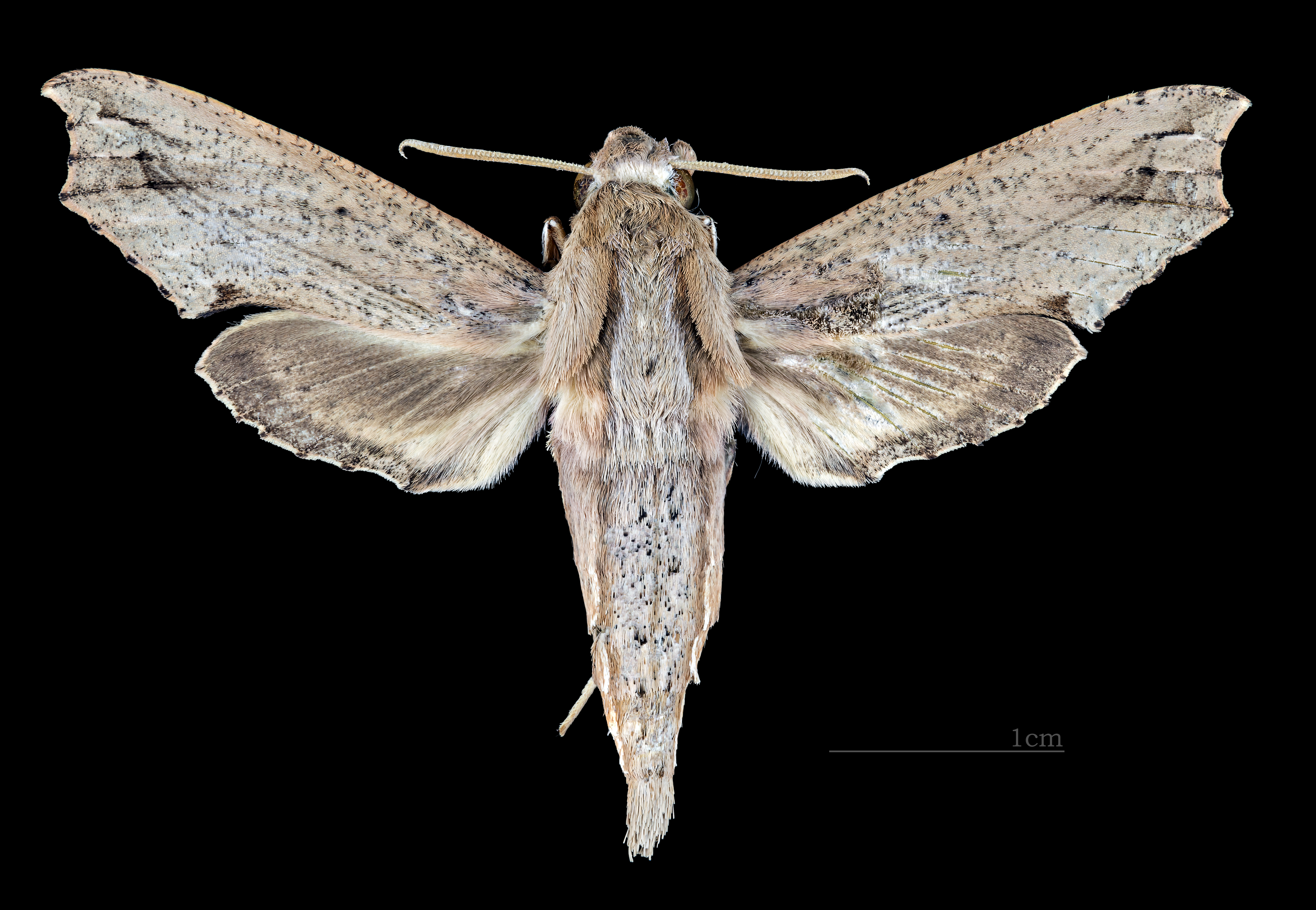
- Eupanacra automedon male dorsal
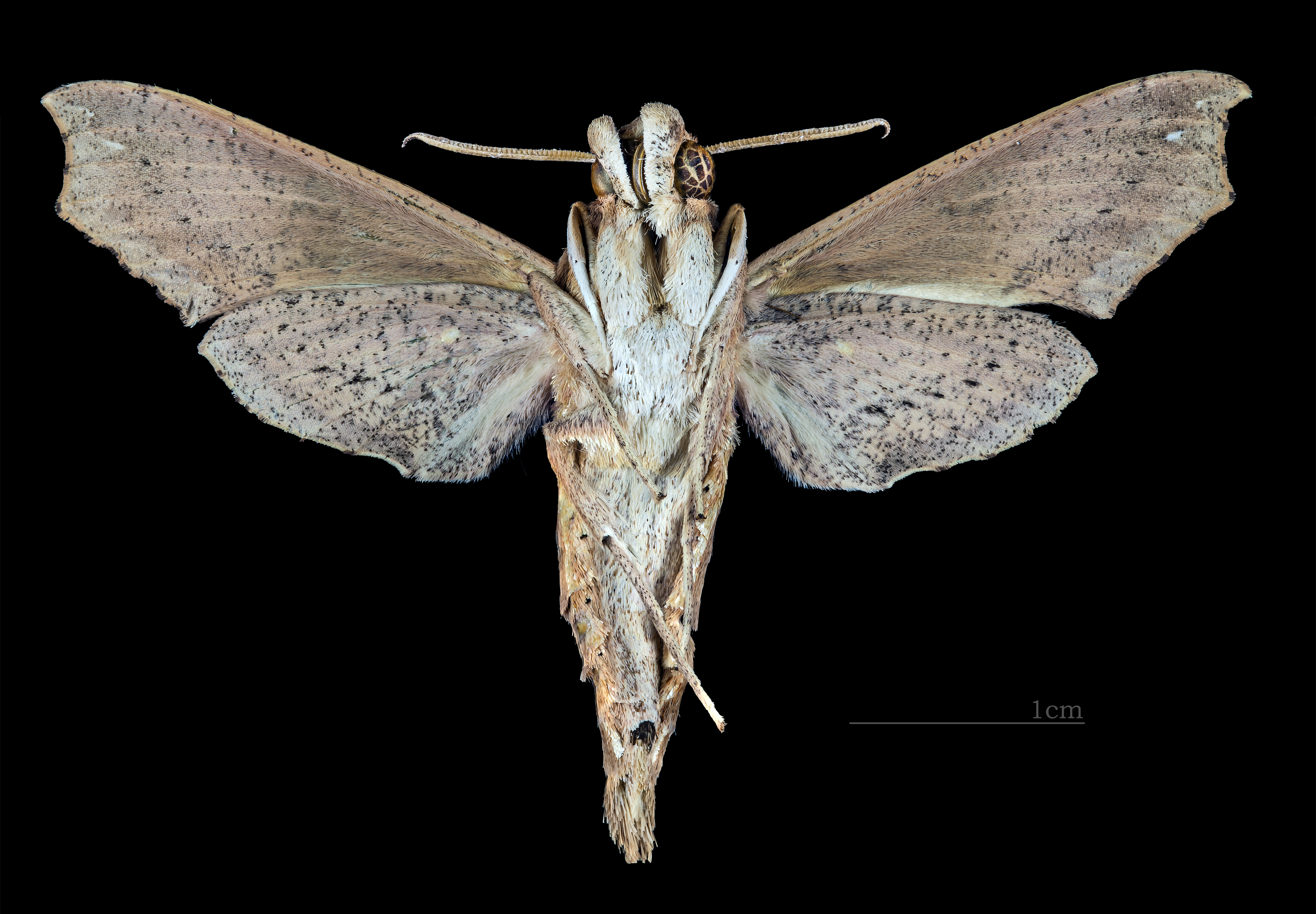
- Eupanacra automedon male ventral

Scientific classification
- Kingdom: Animalia
- Phylum: Arthropoda
- Class: Insecta
- Order: Lepidoptera
- Family: Sphingidae
- Genus: Eupanacra
- Species: E. automedon

Binomial name
- Eupanacra automedon (Walker, 1856)

Synonyms
- Panacra automedon Walker, 1856; Panacra kualalumpuri Clark, 1935; Panacra niasana Clark, 1923; Panacra truncata Walker, 1856

= Eupanacra automedon =

Species of moth

Eupanacra automedon is a moth of the family Sphingidae.

== Distribution ==
It is known from north-eastern India, Nepal, Myanmar, Thailand, Peninsular Malaysia, Sumatra, Nias, Java and Borneo.

== Description ==
It is very similar to Eupanacra malayana.

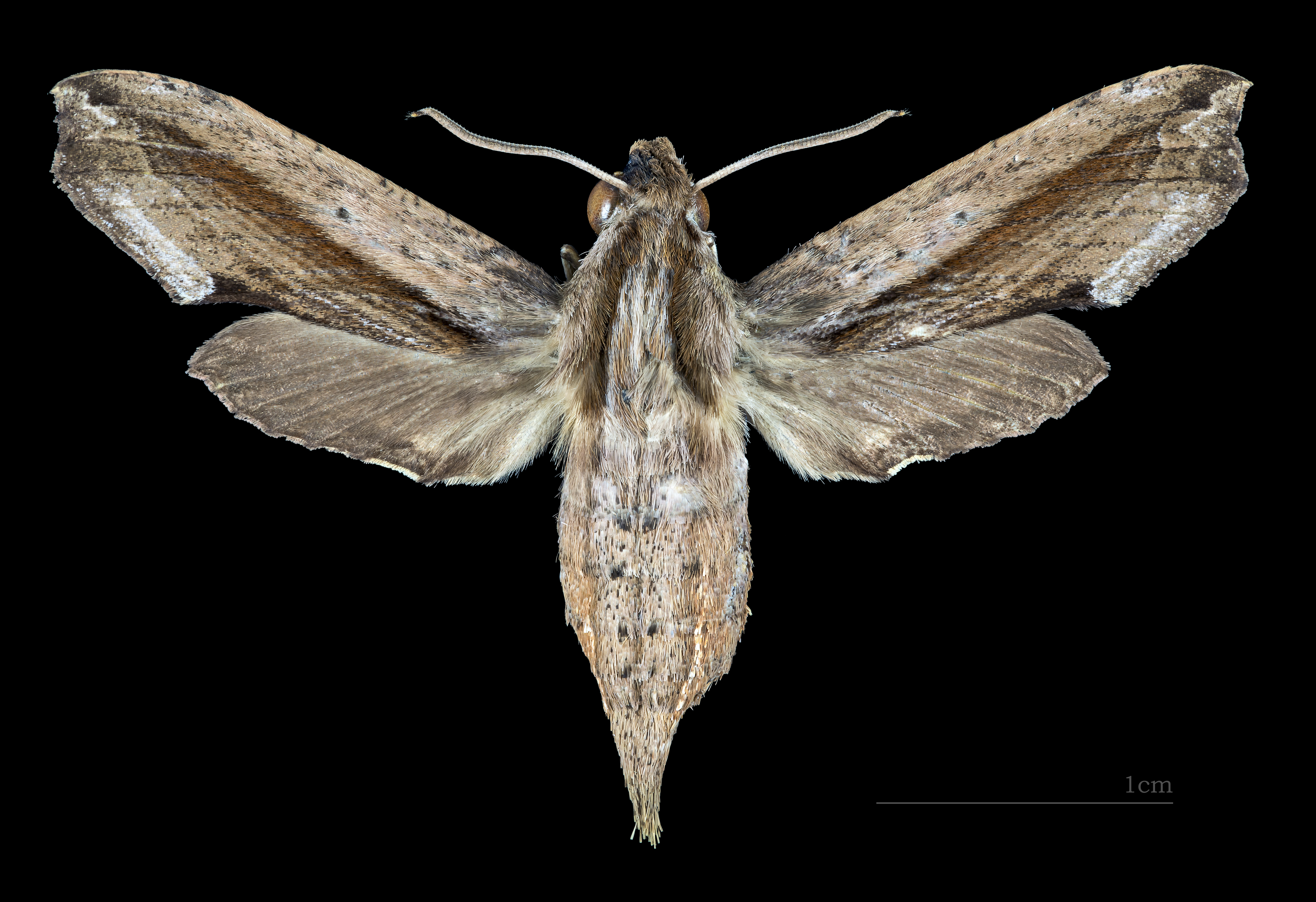
Female dorsal

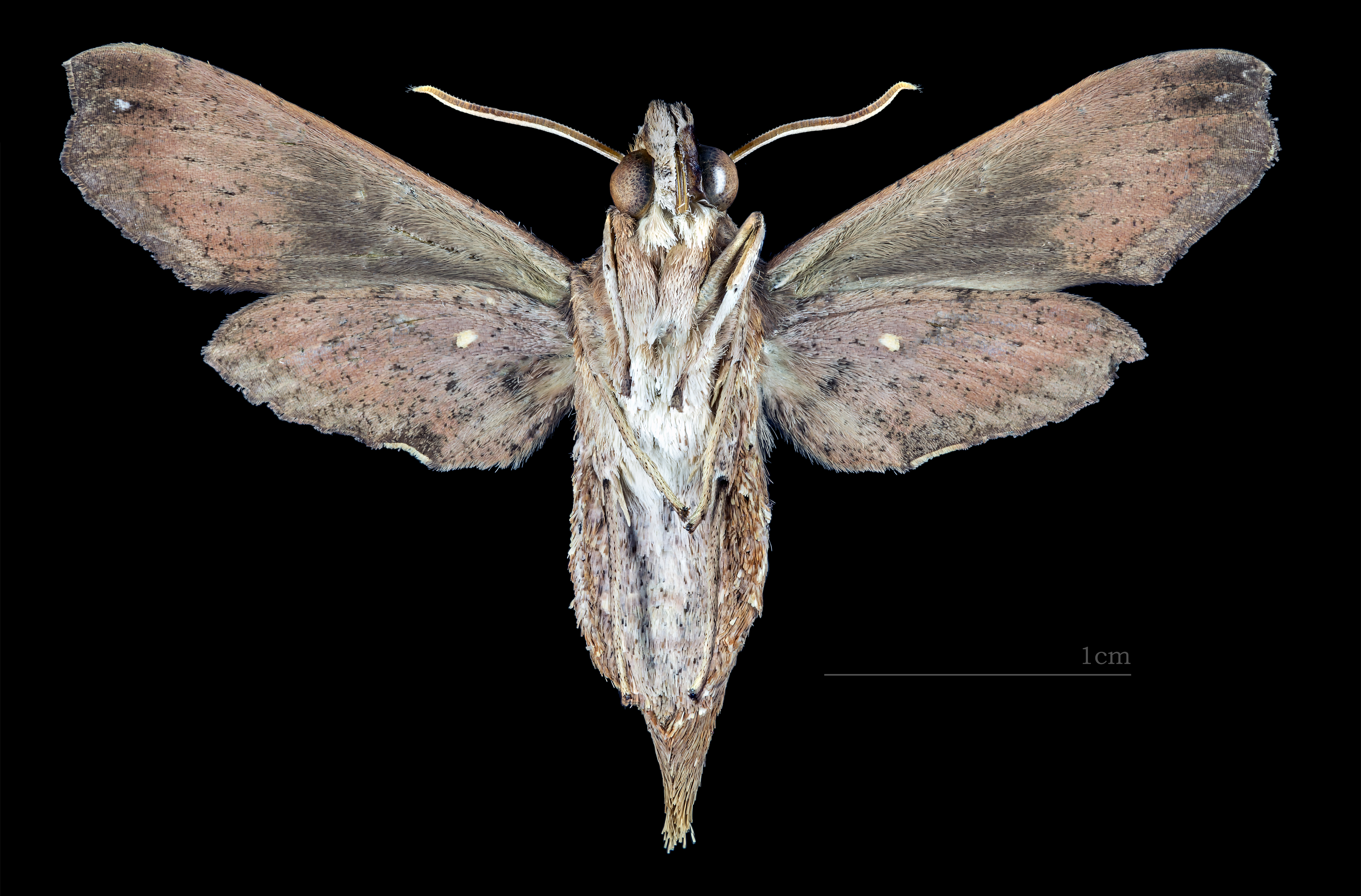
Female ventral

== Biology ==
The larvae have been recorded on Lasia spinosa.
