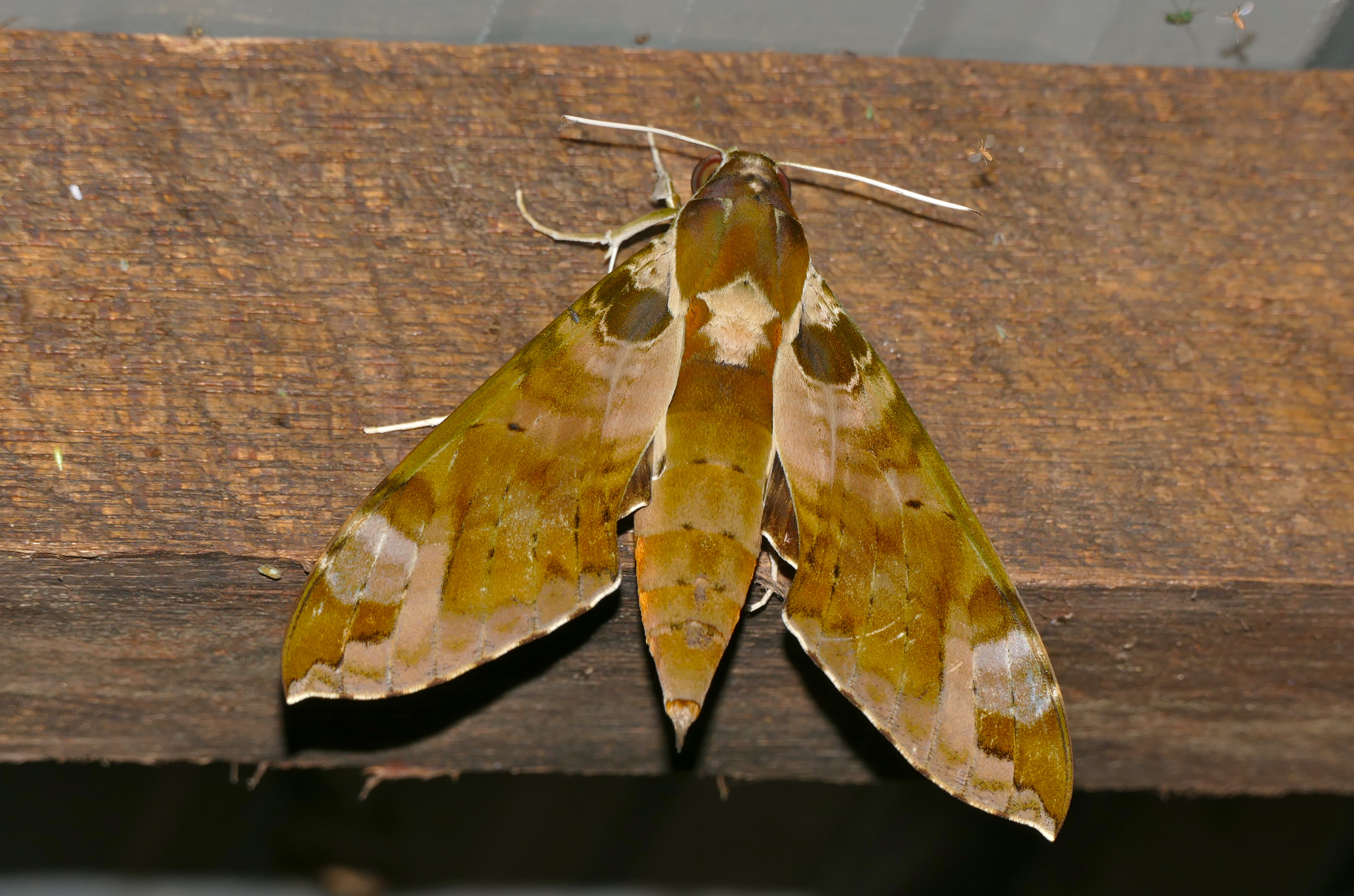
- Cechenena helops

Scientific classification
- Domain: Eukaryota
- Kingdom: Animalia
- Phylum: Arthropoda
- Class: Insecta
- Order: Lepidoptera
- Family: Sphingidae
- Subfamily: Macroglossinae
- Tribe: Macroglossini
- Genus: Cechenena; Rothschild & Jordan, 1903

= Cechenena =

Genus of moths

Cechenena is a genus of moths in the family Sphingidae first described by Walter Rothschild and Karl Jordan in 1903.

== Species ==
- Cechenena aegrota (Butler 1875)
- Cechenena catori (Rothschild, 1894)
- Cechenena chimaera (Rothschild, 1894)
- Cechenena helops (Walker 1856)
- Cechenena lineosa (Walker 1856)
- Cechenena minor (Butler 1875)
- Cechenena mirabilis (Butler 1875)
- Cechenena pollux (Boisduval 1875)
- Cechenena scotti Rothschild 1920
- Cechenena sperlingi Eitschberger, 2007
- Cechenena subangustata Rothschild 1920
- Cechenena transpacifica Clark 1923

== Gallery ==
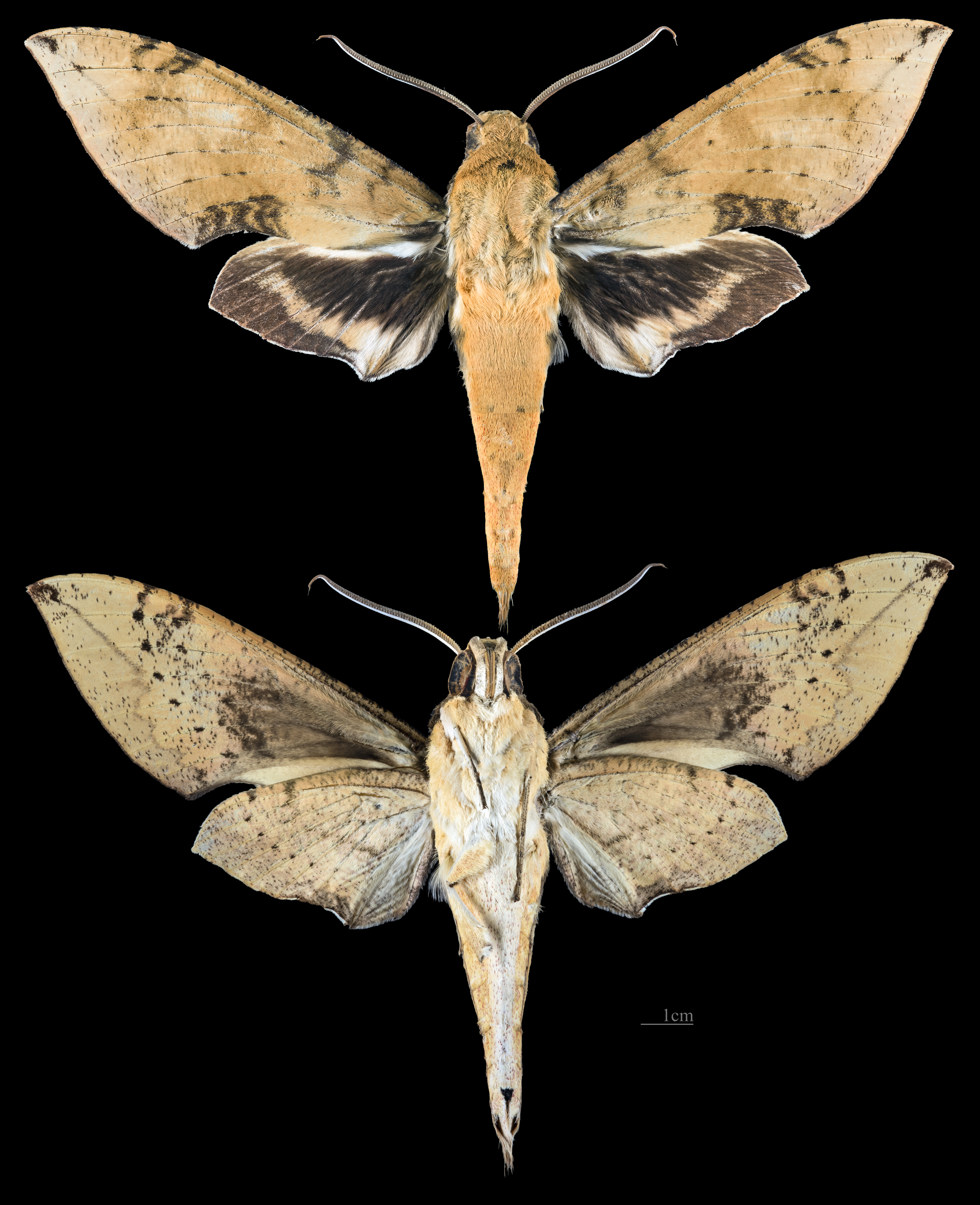
Cechenena aegrota

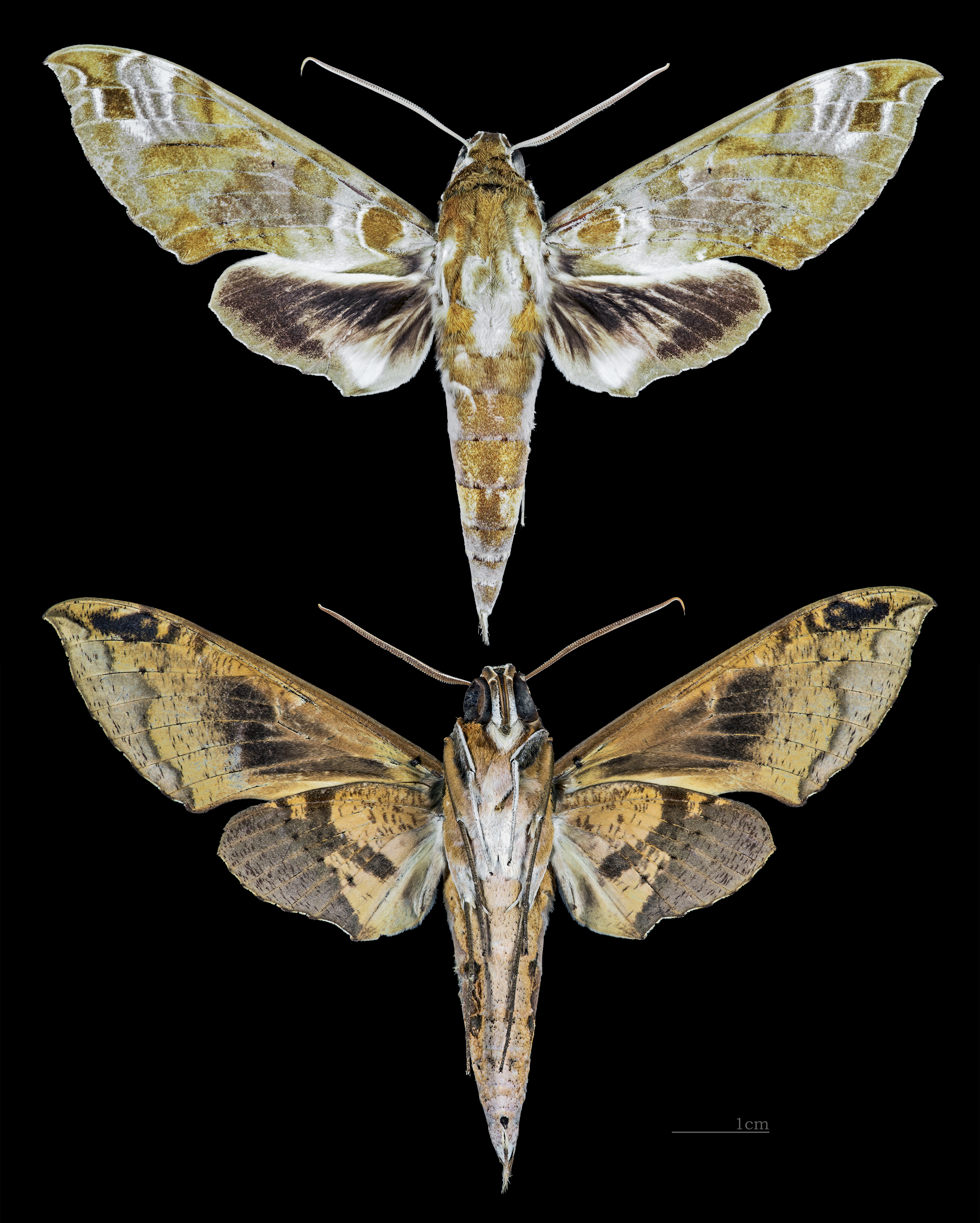
Cechenena helops

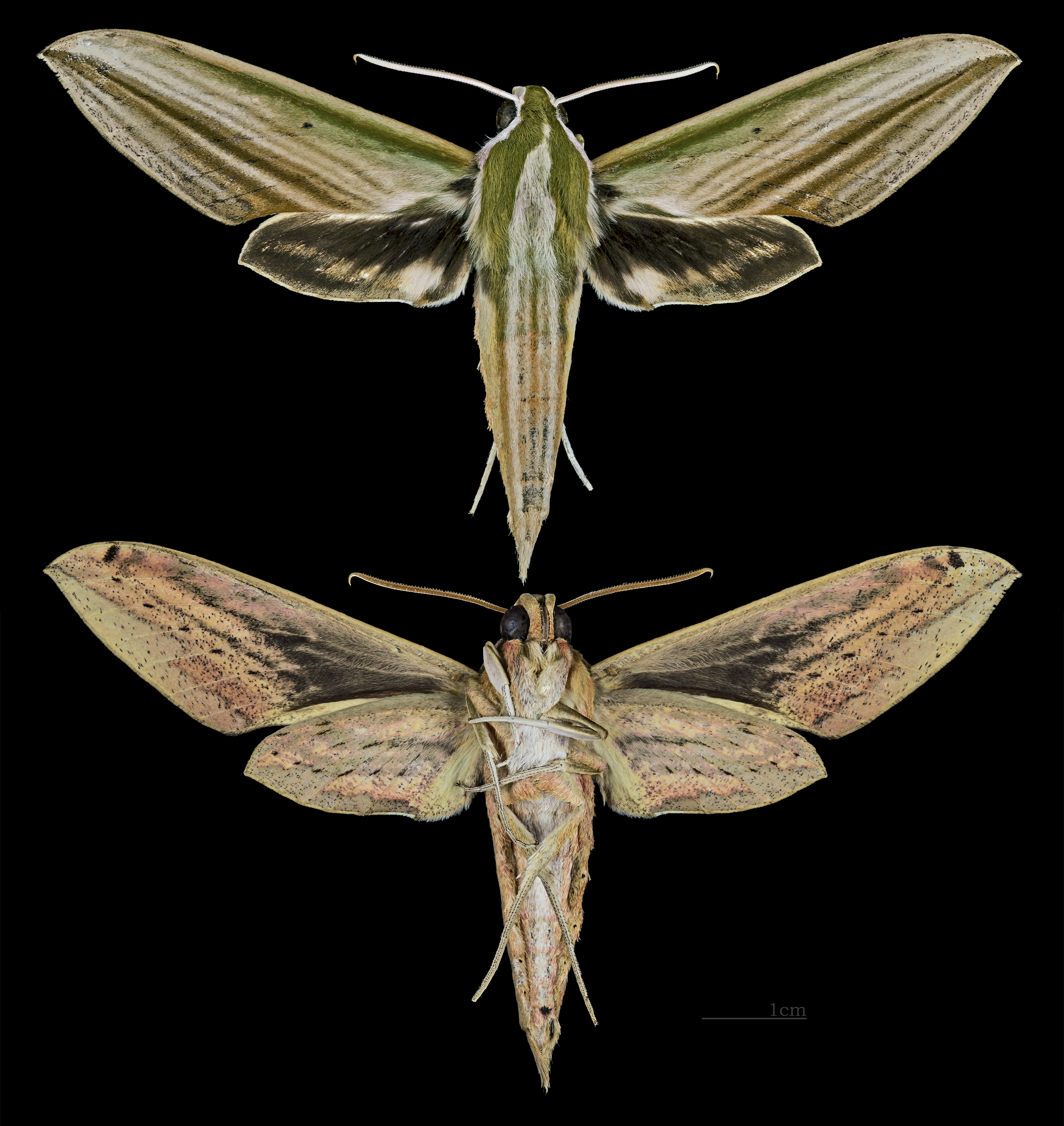
Cechenena lineosa

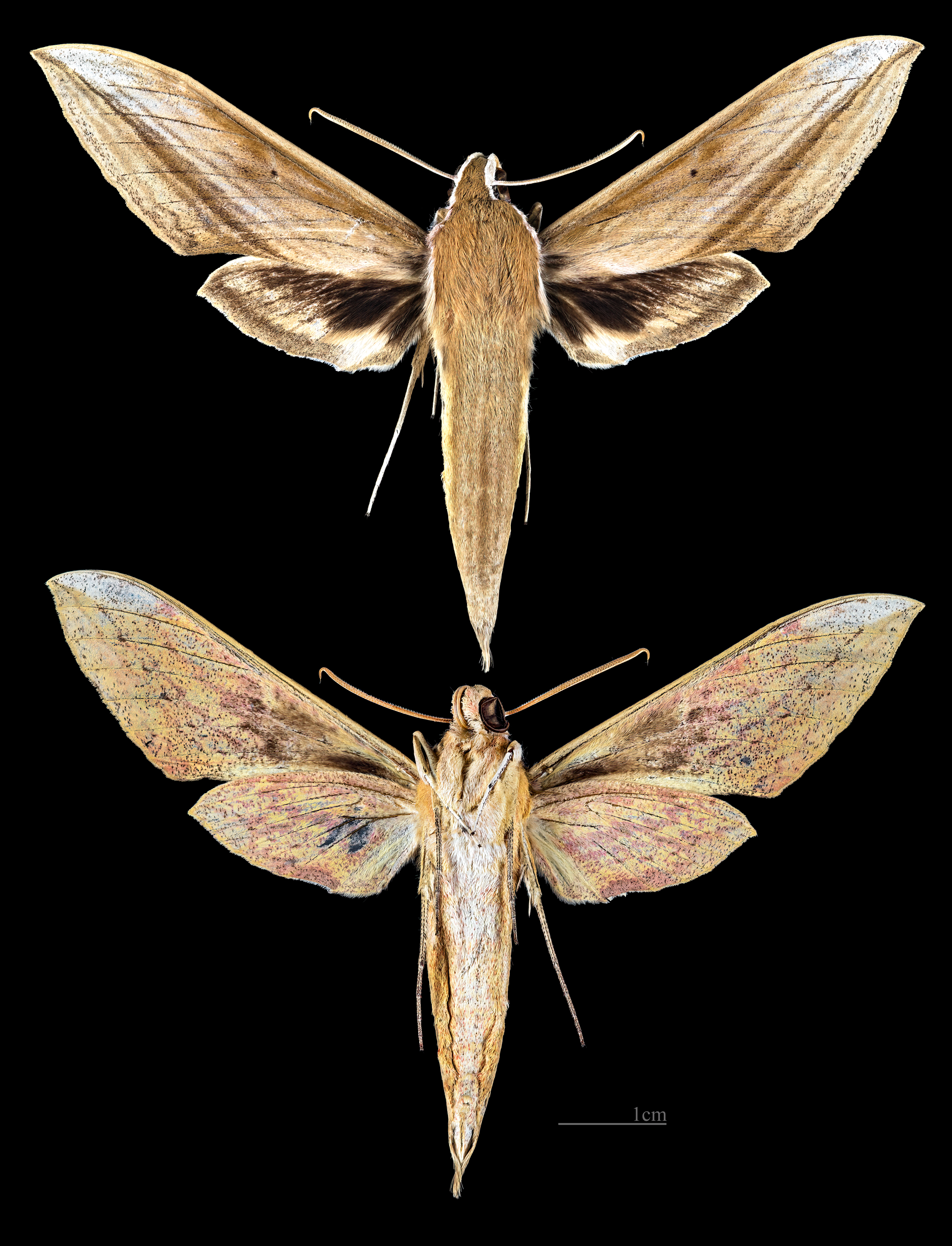
Cechenena minor

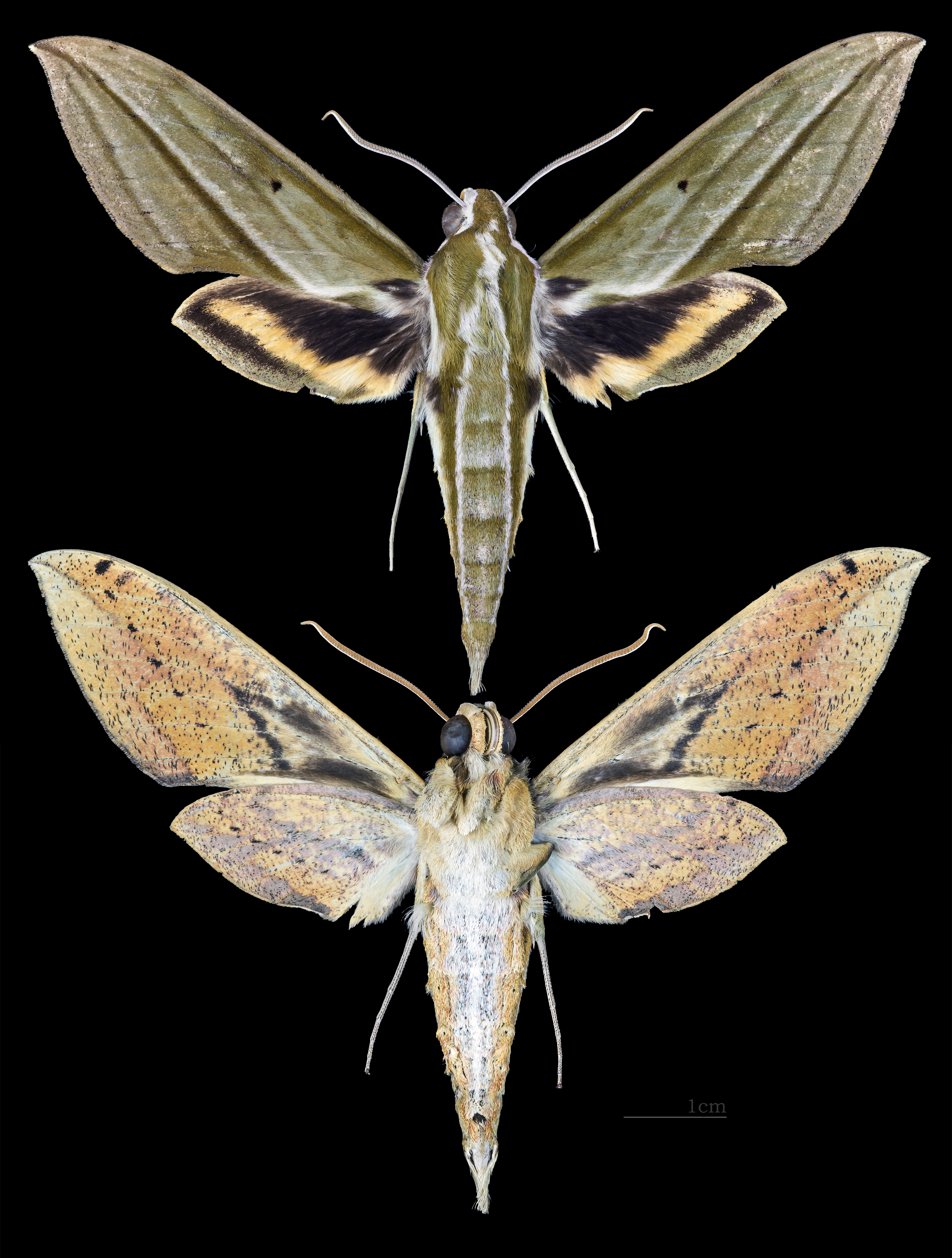
Cechenena pollux

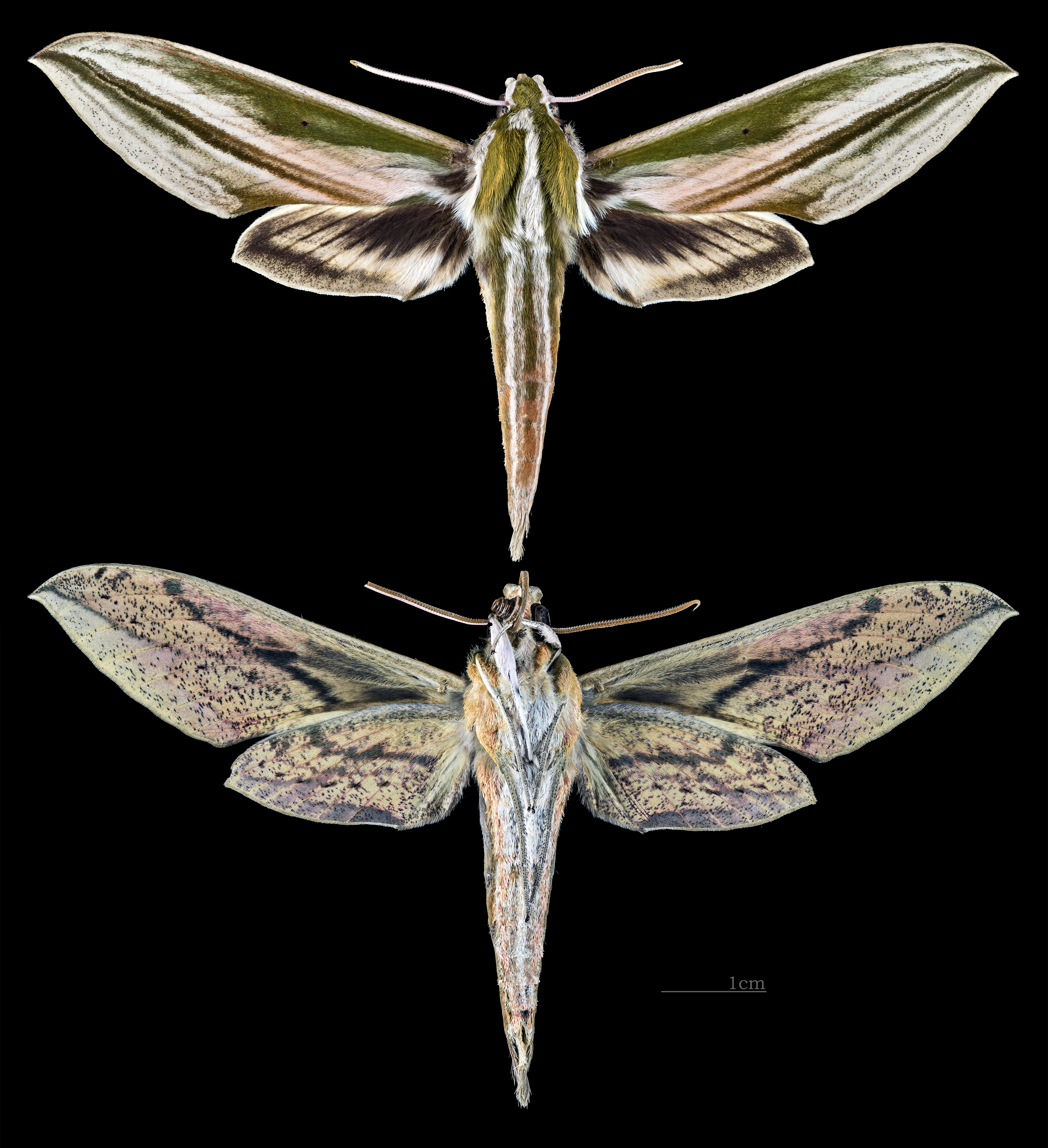
Cechenena scotti

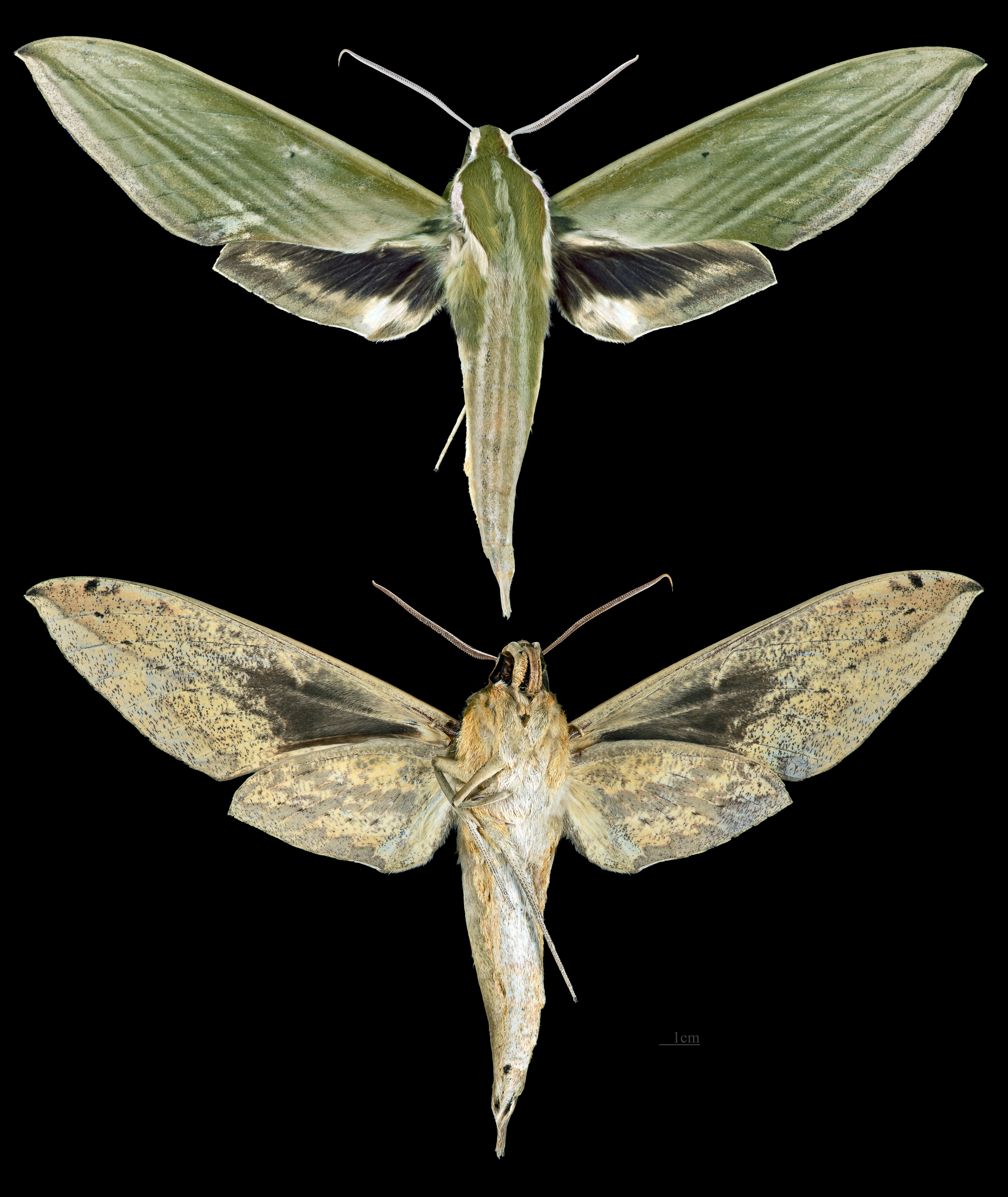
Cechenena subangustata

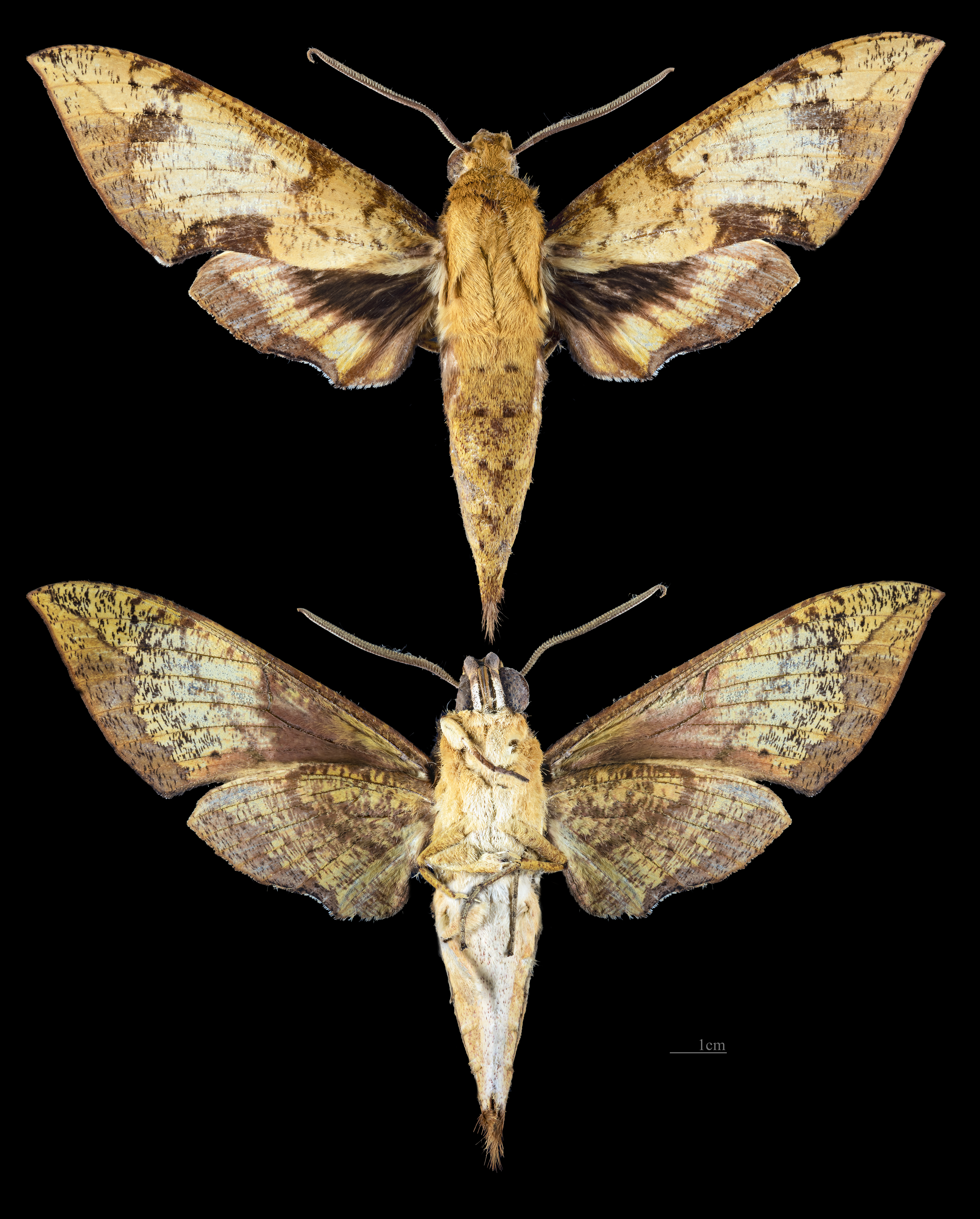
Cechenena transpacifica
