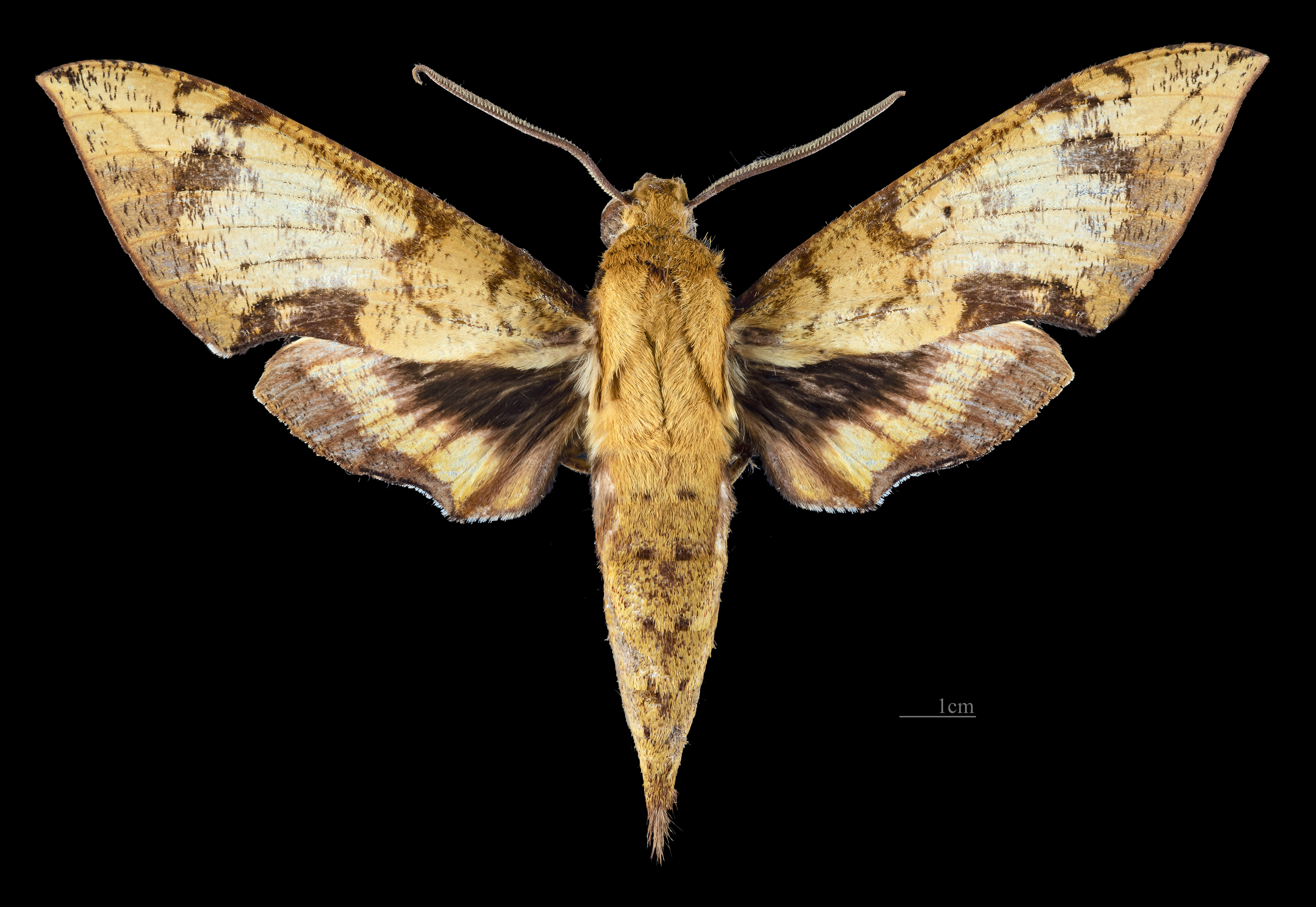
- Male dorsal
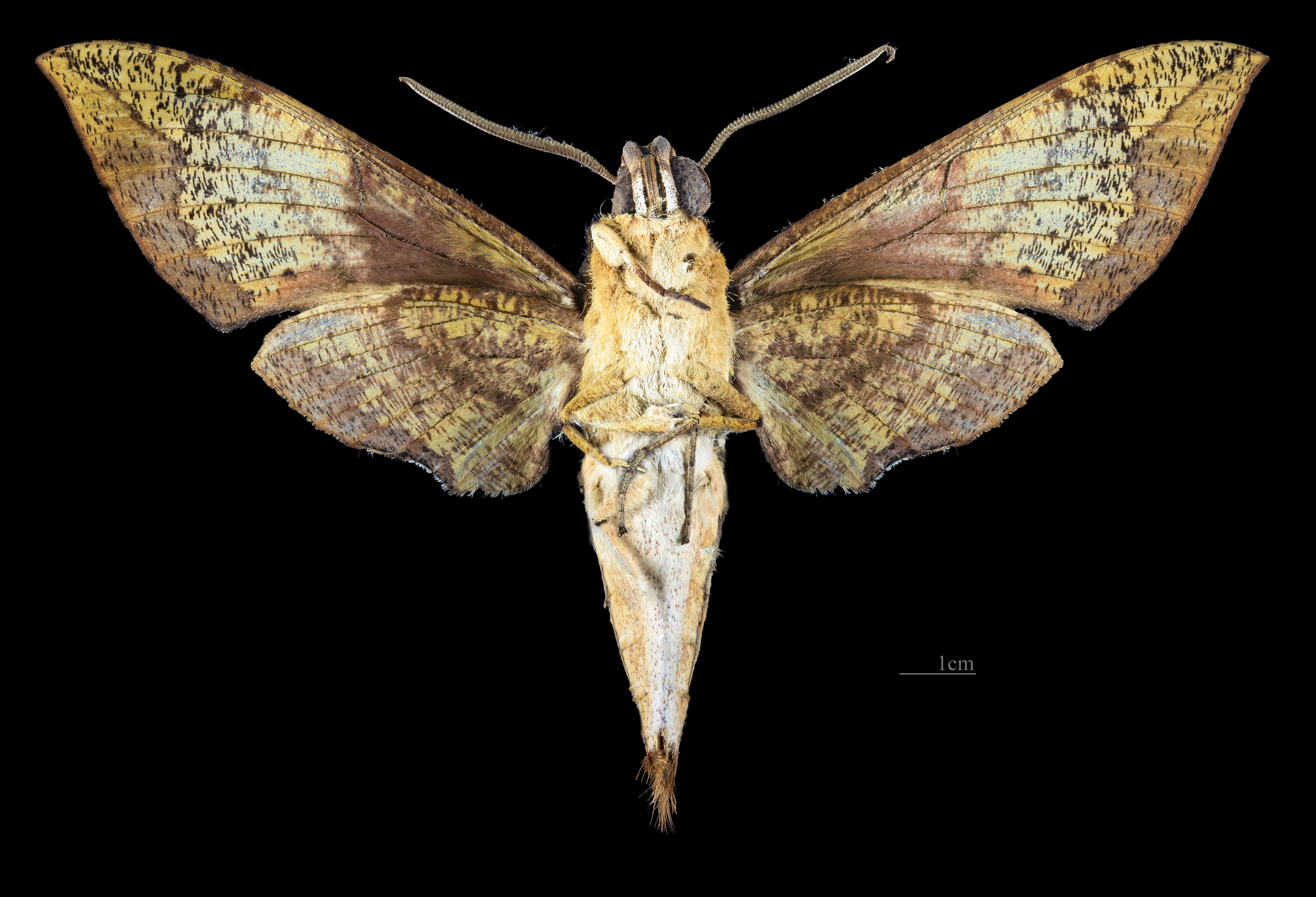
- Male ventral

Scientific classification
- Kingdom: Animalia
- Phylum: Arthropoda
- Class: Insecta
- Order: Lepidoptera
- Family: Sphingidae
- Genus: Cechenena
- Species: C. transpacifica

Binomial name
- Cechenena transpacifica Clark, 1923

= Cechenena transpacifica =

Species of moth

Cechenena transpacifica is a moth of the family Sphingidae. It is known from the Philippines.

This moth is similar to Cechenena chimaera, but the basal area of the forewing underside is reddish-ochre. Adults are sexually dimorphic. The intensity of the dark pattern of the forewing upperside in males is highly variable, ranging from very heavily marked to nearly unmarked.
