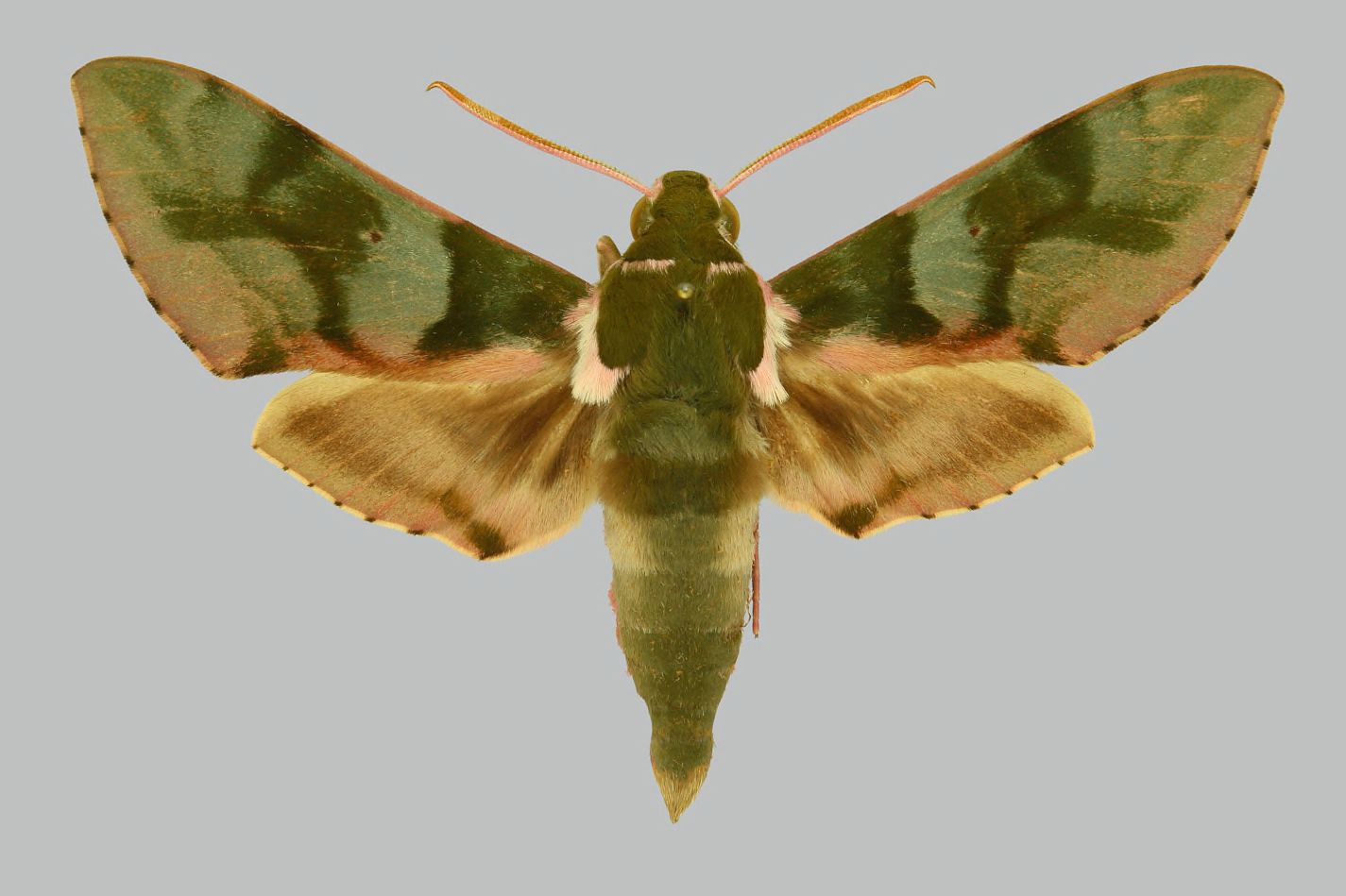

Scientific classification
- Kingdom: Animalia
- Phylum: Arthropoda
- Class: Insecta
- Order: Lepidoptera
- Family: Sphingidae
- Genus: Cechenena
- Species: C. mirabilis

Binomial name
- Cechenena mirabilis (Butler, 1875)

Synonyms
- Chaerocampa mirabilis Butler, 1875

= Cechenena mirabilis =

Species of moth

Cechenena mirabilis is a moth of the family Sphingidae. It is known from the Himalayas in India.

It differs from all other Cechenena species by the blue-green ground colour of the forewing upperside which is overlain by a dark green basal and median pattern. There is a H-shaped patch just distal to the small and indistinct pale discal spot. The thorax upperside is dark green and there are no dorsal lines on the abdomen.
