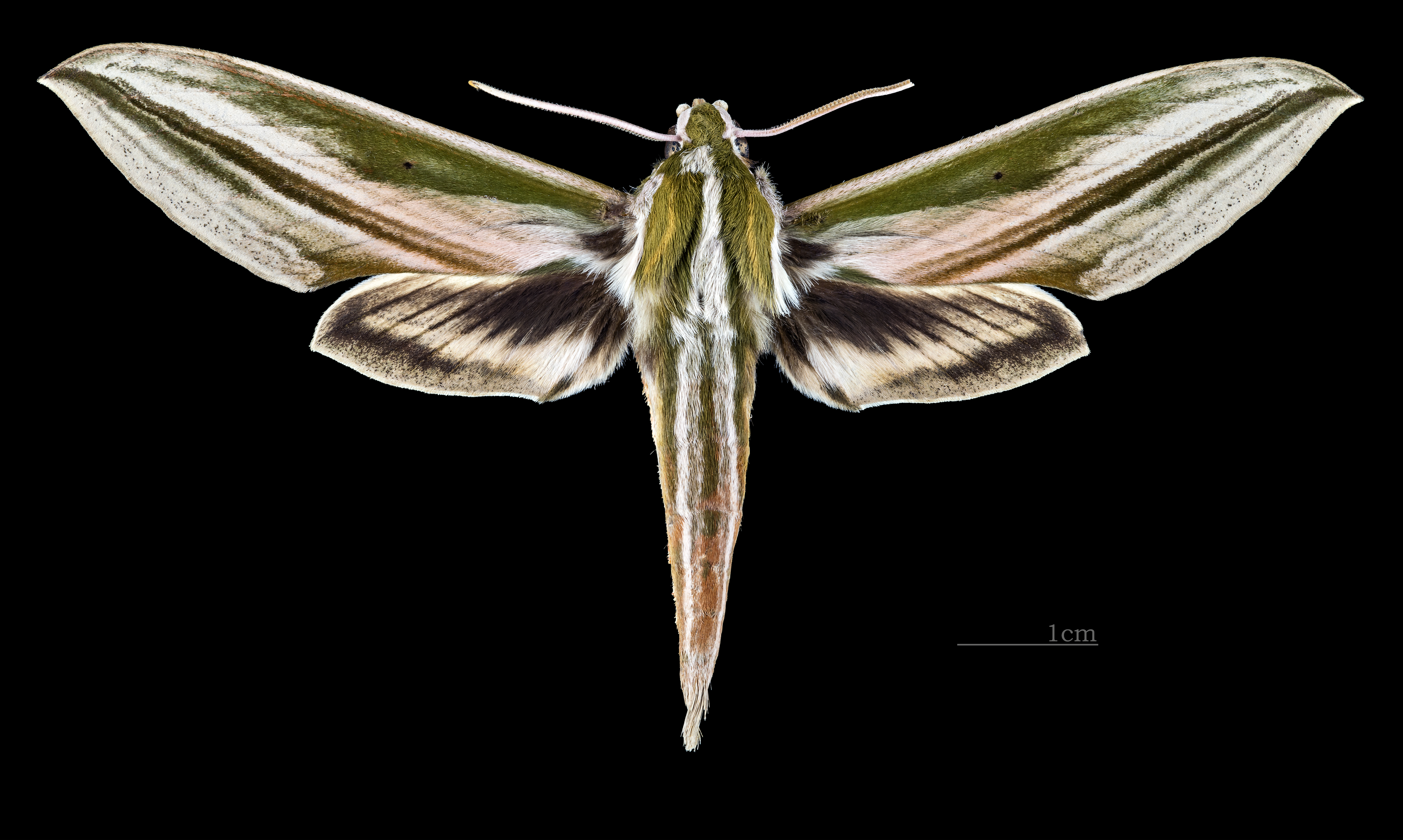
- Male dorsal
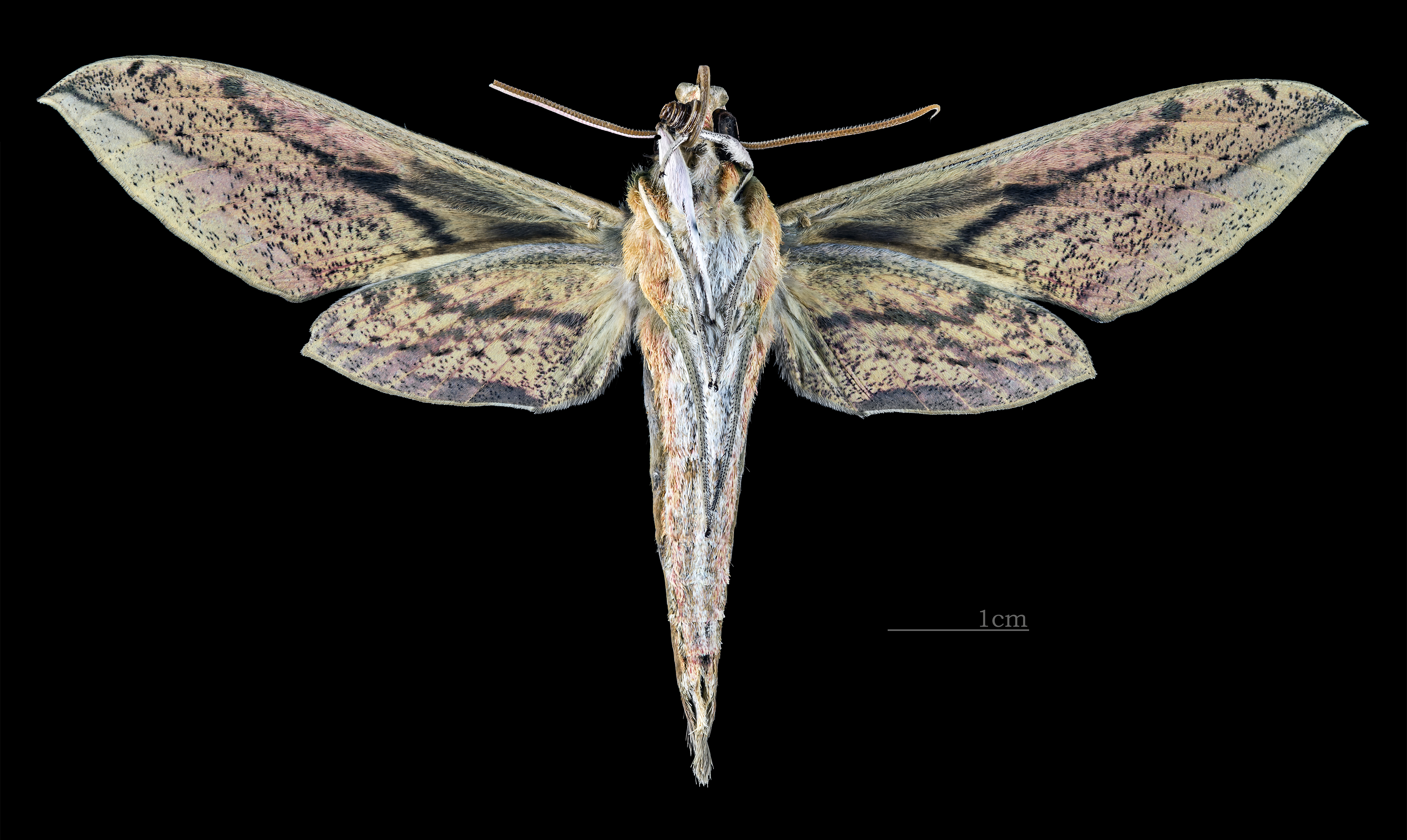
- Male ventral

Scientific classification
- Kingdom: Animalia
- Phylum: Arthropoda
- Class: Insecta
- Order: Lepidoptera
- Family: Sphingidae
- Genus: Cechenena
- Species: C. scotti

Binomial name
- Cechenena scotti Rothschild, 1920

Synonyms
- Cechenena pundjabensis Gehlen, 1931

= Cechenena scotti =

Species of moth

Cechenena scotti is a moth of the family Sphingidae. It is known from India, Nepal and Vietnam.

It is similar to Cechenena lineosa, but there is pink dorsal scaling on the antenna and there is an olive-green band running along the costa that contrasts strongly with the almost white ground colour of the remainder of the wing, which is flushed pink basally.
