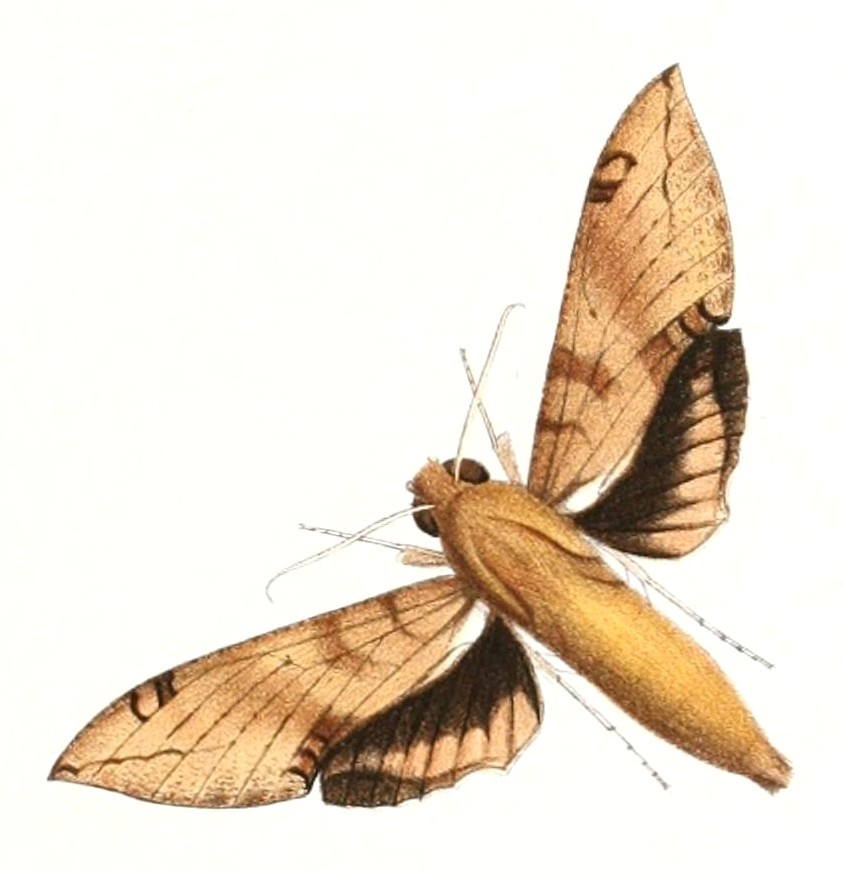

Scientific classification
- Kingdom: Animalia
- Phylum: Arthropoda
- Class: Insecta
- Order: Lepidoptera
- Family: Sphingidae
- Genus: Cechenena
- Species: C. chimaera

Binomial name
- Cechenena chimaera (Rothschild, 1894)

Synonyms
- Daphnis chimaera Rothschild, 1894

= Cechenena chimaera =

Species of moth

Cechenena chimaera is a moth of the family Sphingidae. It is known from south-east Asia, including Malaysia, Thailand, Indonesia and the Philippines.

The wingspan is about 84 mm. Adults are sexually dimorphic. It is very similar to Cechenena aegrota, but larger and there is a difference in the pattern on the forewing upperside.
