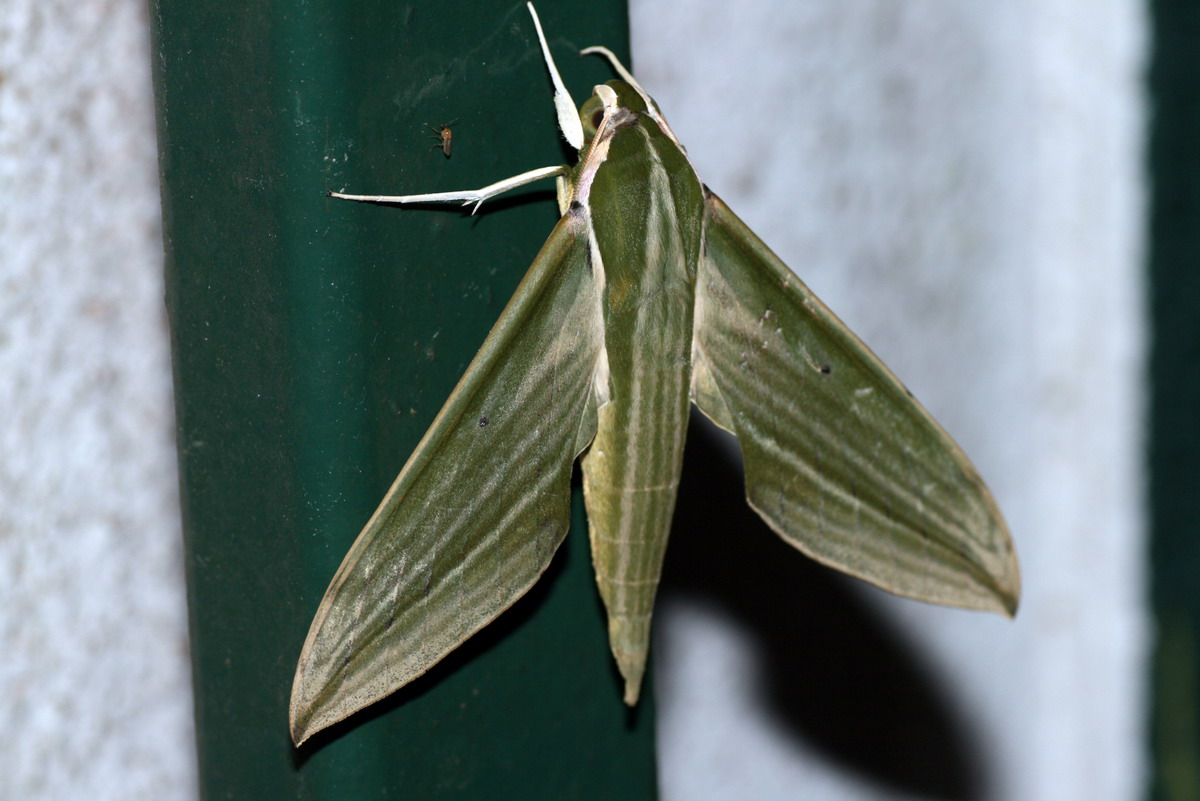

Scientific classification
- Kingdom: Animalia
- Phylum: Arthropoda
- Class: Insecta
- Order: Lepidoptera
- Family: Sphingidae
- Genus: Cechenena
- Species: C. subangustata

Binomial name
- Cechenena subangustata Rothschild, 1920

= Cechenena subangustata =

Species of moth

Cechenena subangustata is a moth of the family Sphingidae.

== Distribution ==
It is known from Nepal, north-eastern India, Thailand, south-western China, Taiwan, Malaysia (Peninsular, Sarawak) and Indonesia (Sumatra, Java, Kalimantan).

== Description ==
It is very similar to Cechenena lineosa.

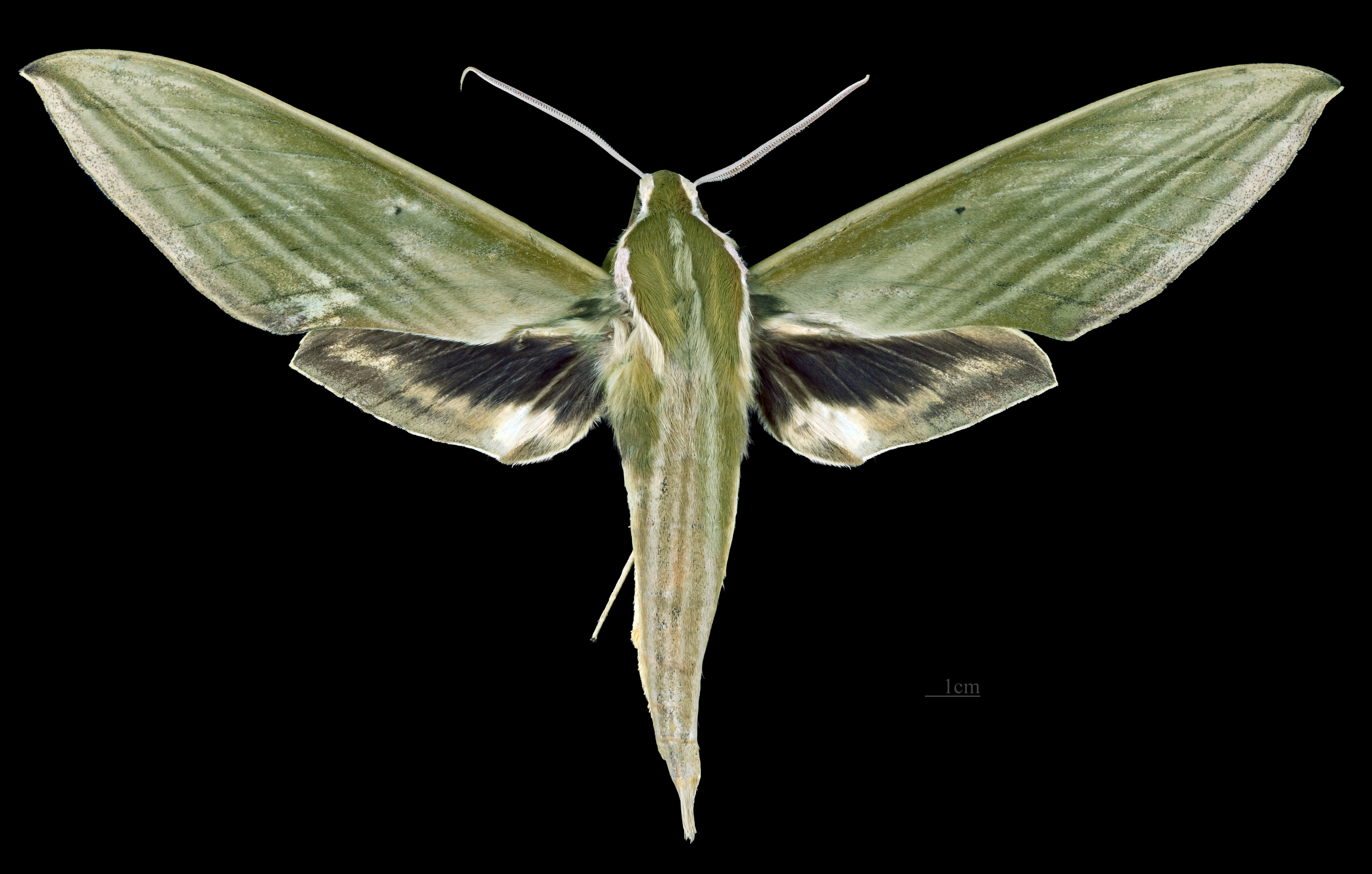
Male dorsal view

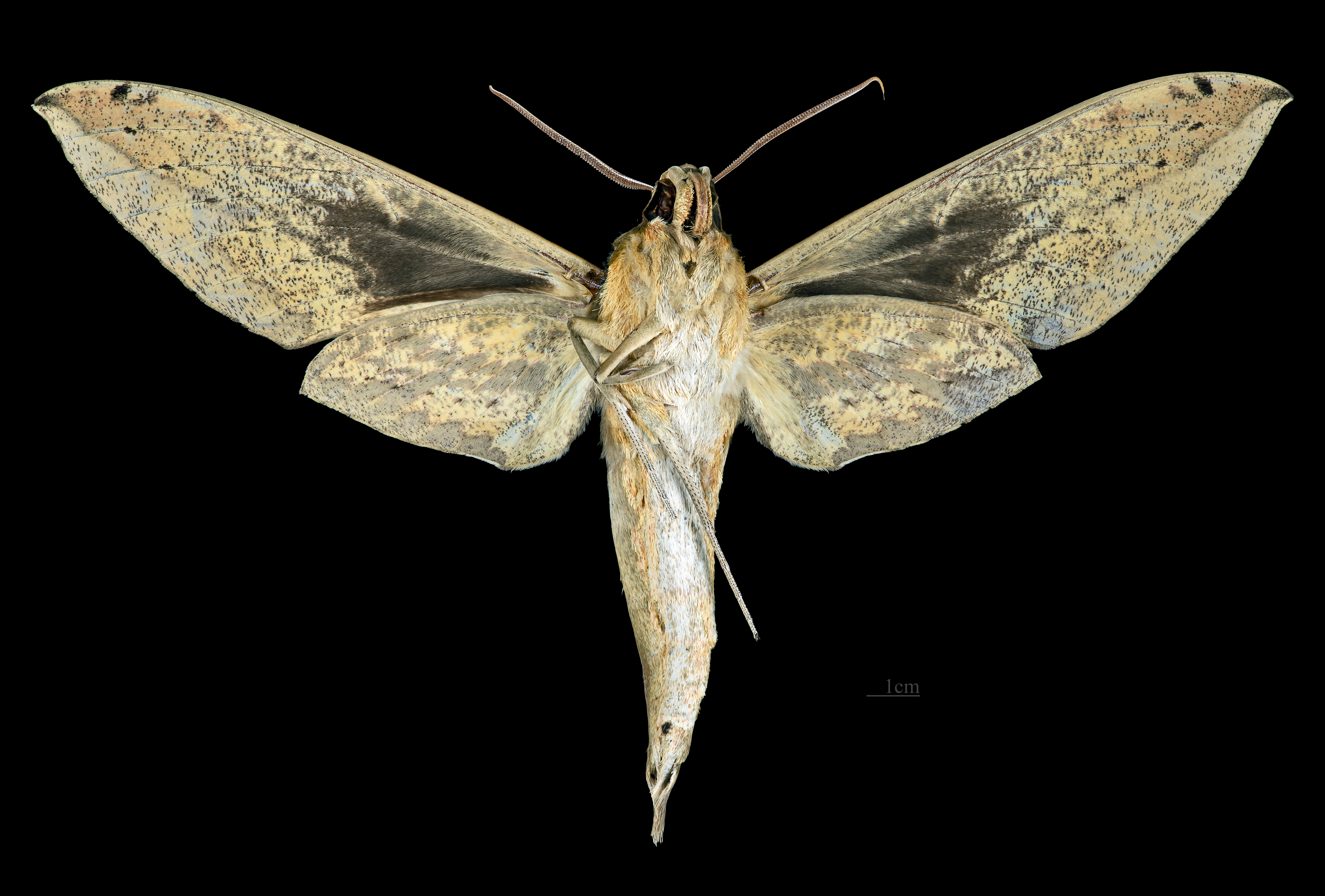
Male ventral view

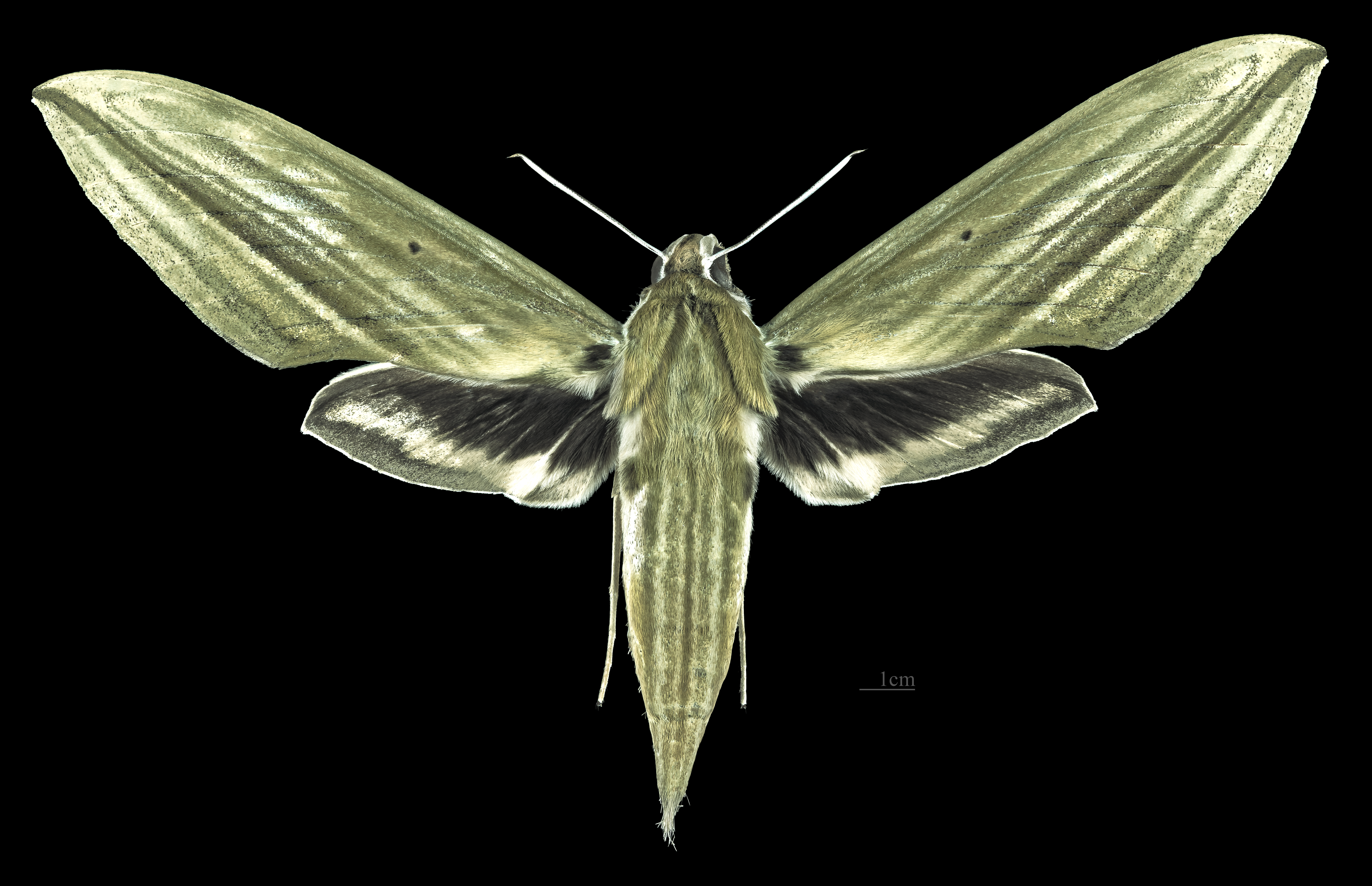
Female dorsal view

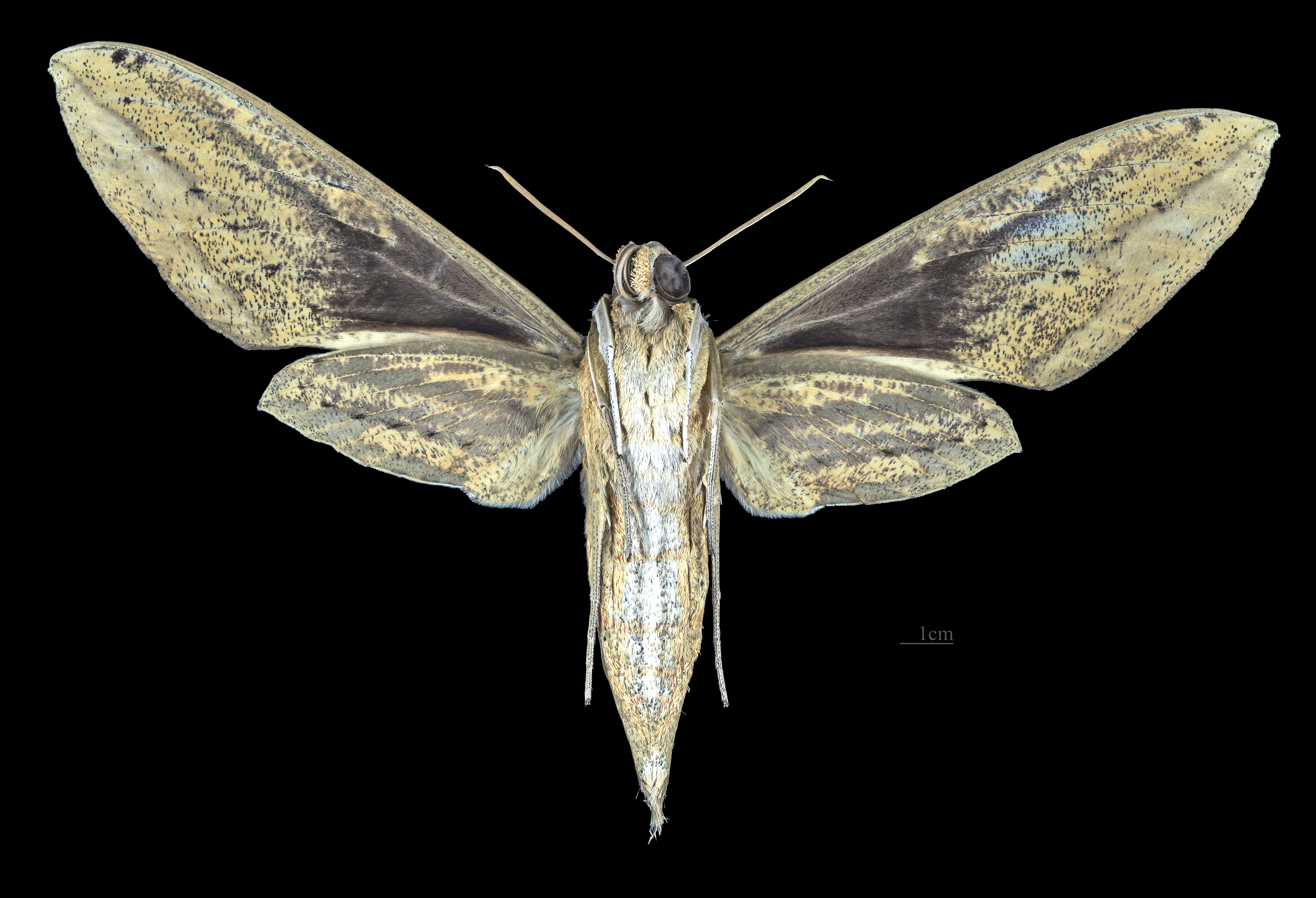
Female ventral wing
