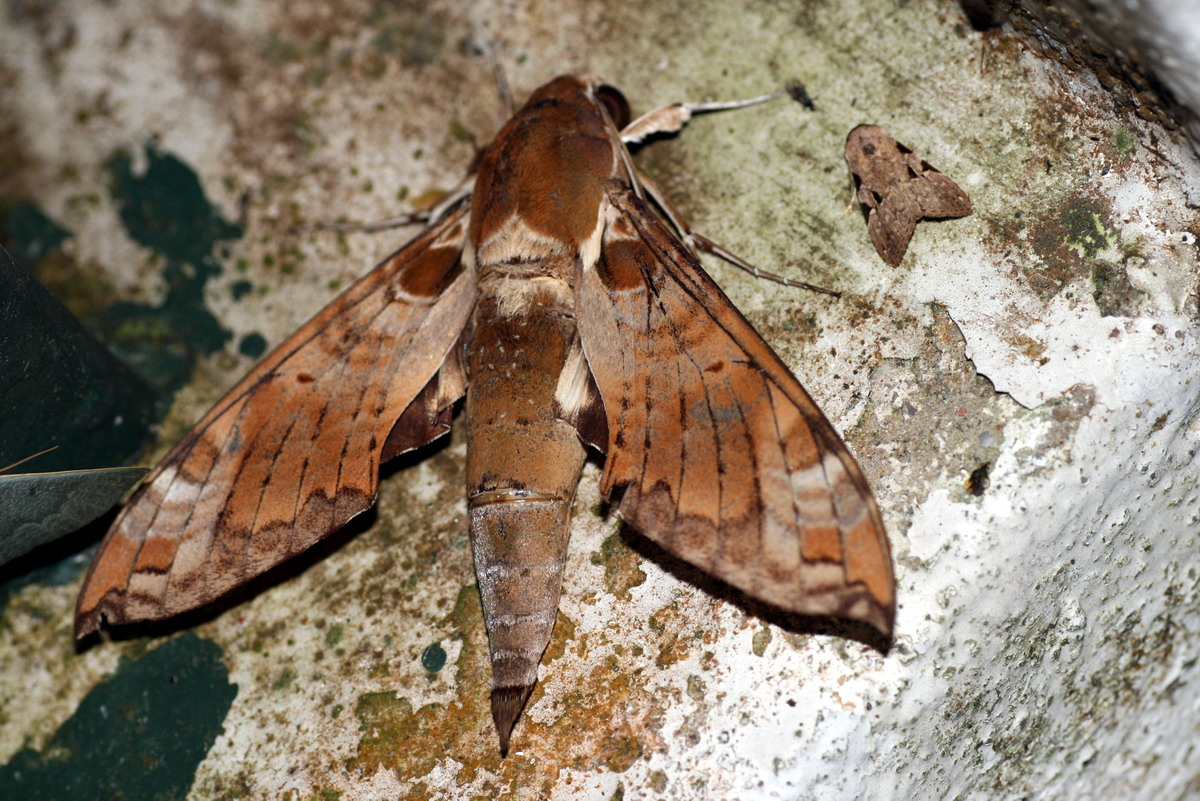

Scientific classification
- Kingdom: Animalia
- Phylum: Arthropoda
- Class: Insecta
- Order: Lepidoptera
- Family: Sphingidae
- Genus: Cechenena
- Species: C. helops

Binomial name
- Cechenena helops Walker, 1856

Synonyms
- Philampelus orientalis R. Felder, 1874

= Cechenena helops =

Species of moth

Cechenena helops is a moth of the family Sphingidae first described by Francis Walker in 1856. It is found in Malaysia (Peninsular, Sarawak, Sabah), Indonesia (Sumatra, Java, Kalimantan, Seram, Papua New Guinea), the Philippines (Palawan, Balabac), Nepal, north-eastern India, Thailand, south-western China and Vietnam.

== Description ==
Their wingspan is 104 to 126 millimetres (4.1 to 5.0 in). Adults are grey green with a large oval olive-brown spot at the base of the forewing upperside.

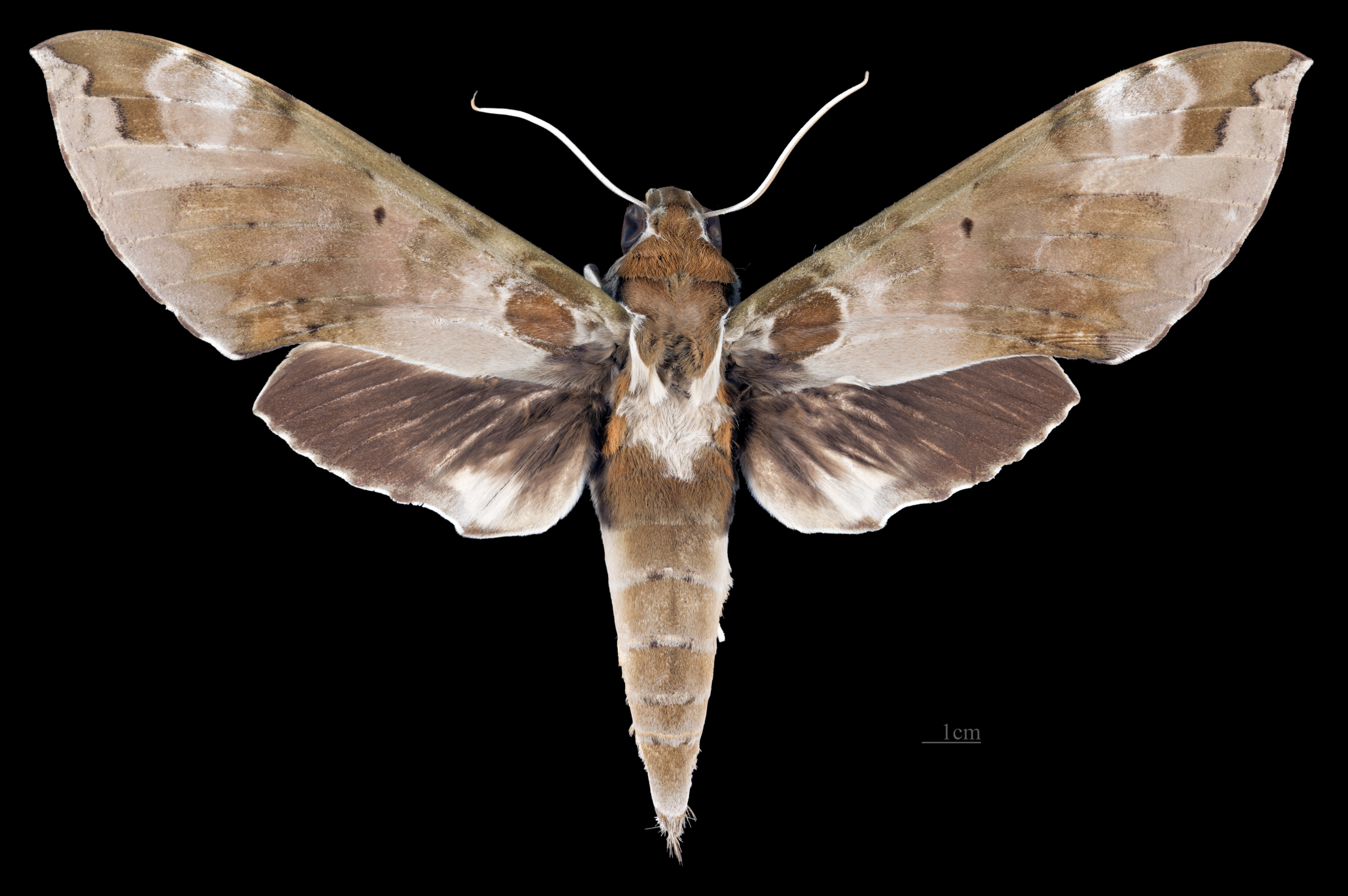
Cechenena helops helops, female dorsal view

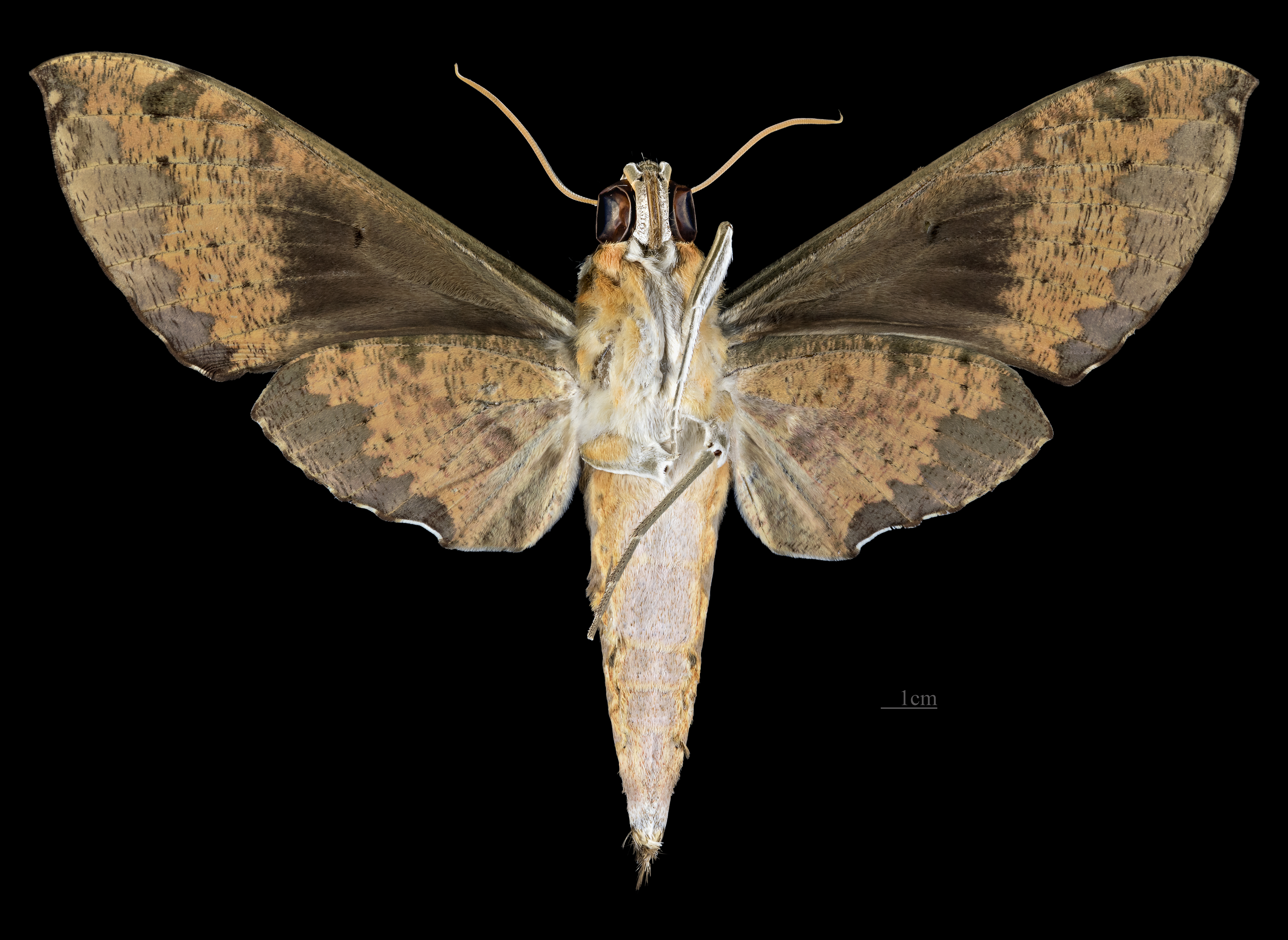
Cechenena helops helops, female ventral view

== Biology ==
Larvae have been recorded feeding on Tetracera species.

== Subspecies ==
- Cechenena helops helops (Malaysia (Peninsular, Sarawak, Sabah), Indonesia (Sumatra, Java, Kalimantan), the Philippines (Palawan, Balabac), Nepal, north-eastern India, Thailand, south-western China, Vietnam)
- Cechenena helops interposita Joicey & Talbot, 1921 (Seram)
- Cechenena helops papuana Rothschild & Jordan, 1903 (Papua Barat and Papua New Guinea)
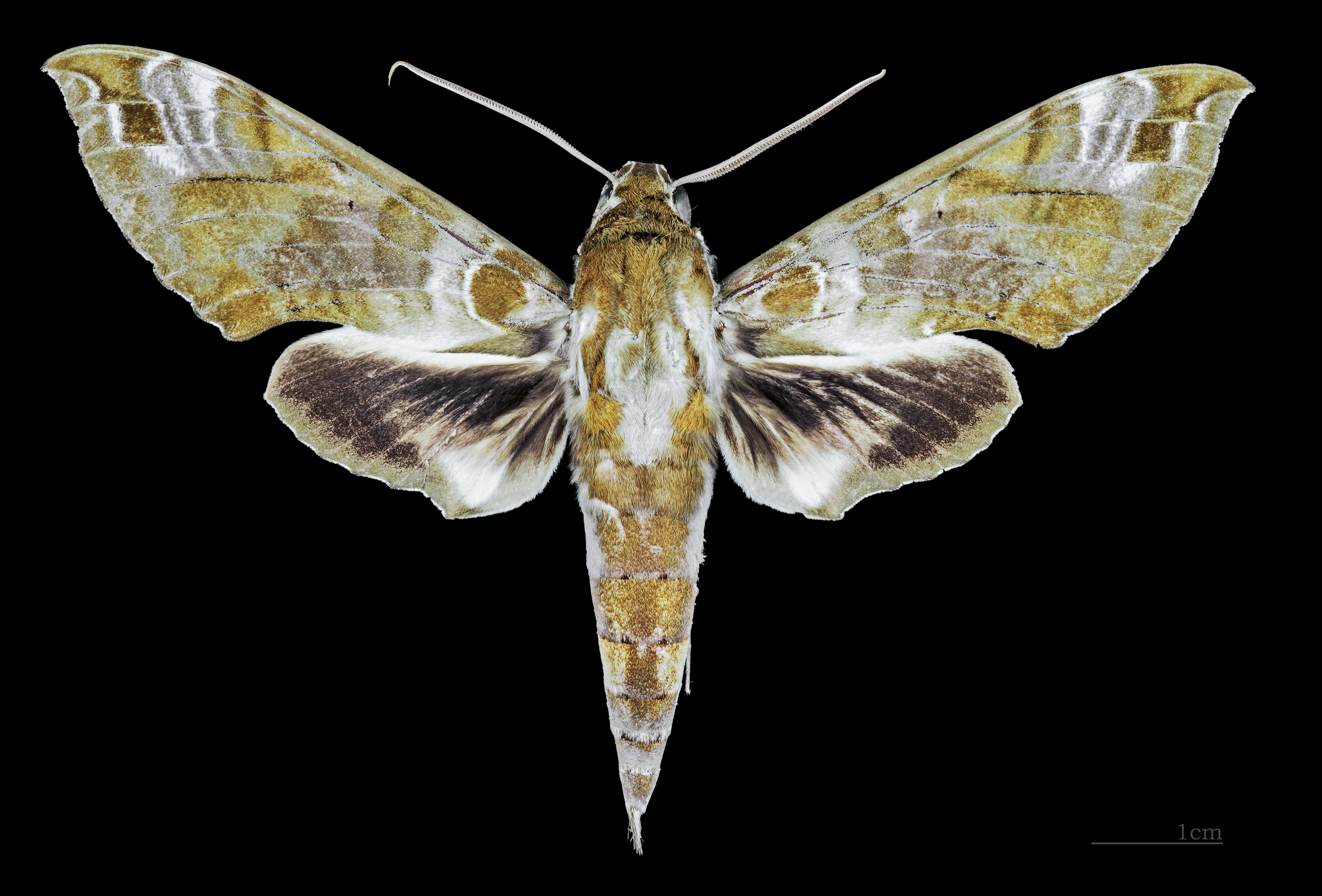
Cechenena helops papuana, female dorsal view

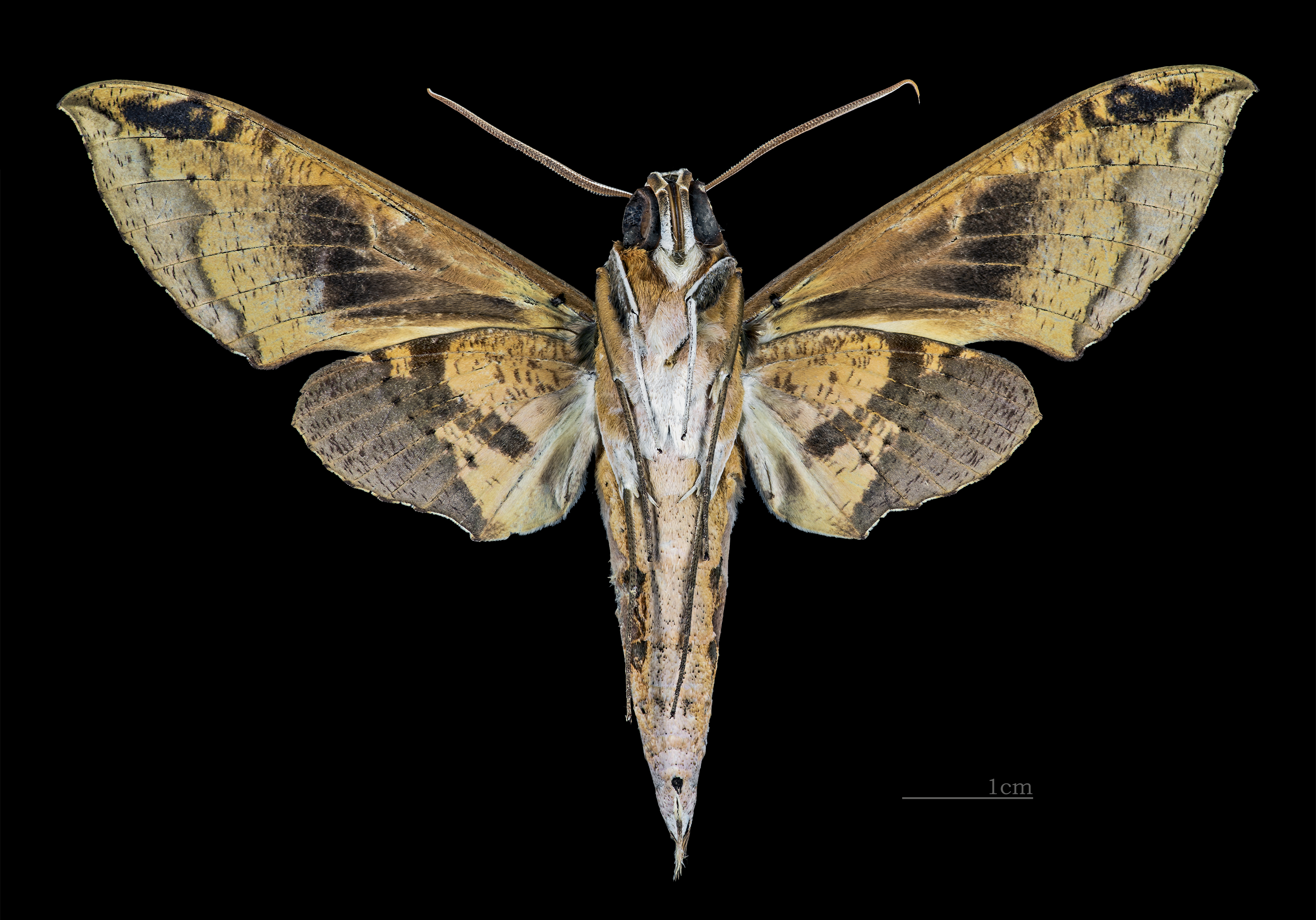
Cechenena helops papuana, female ventral view
