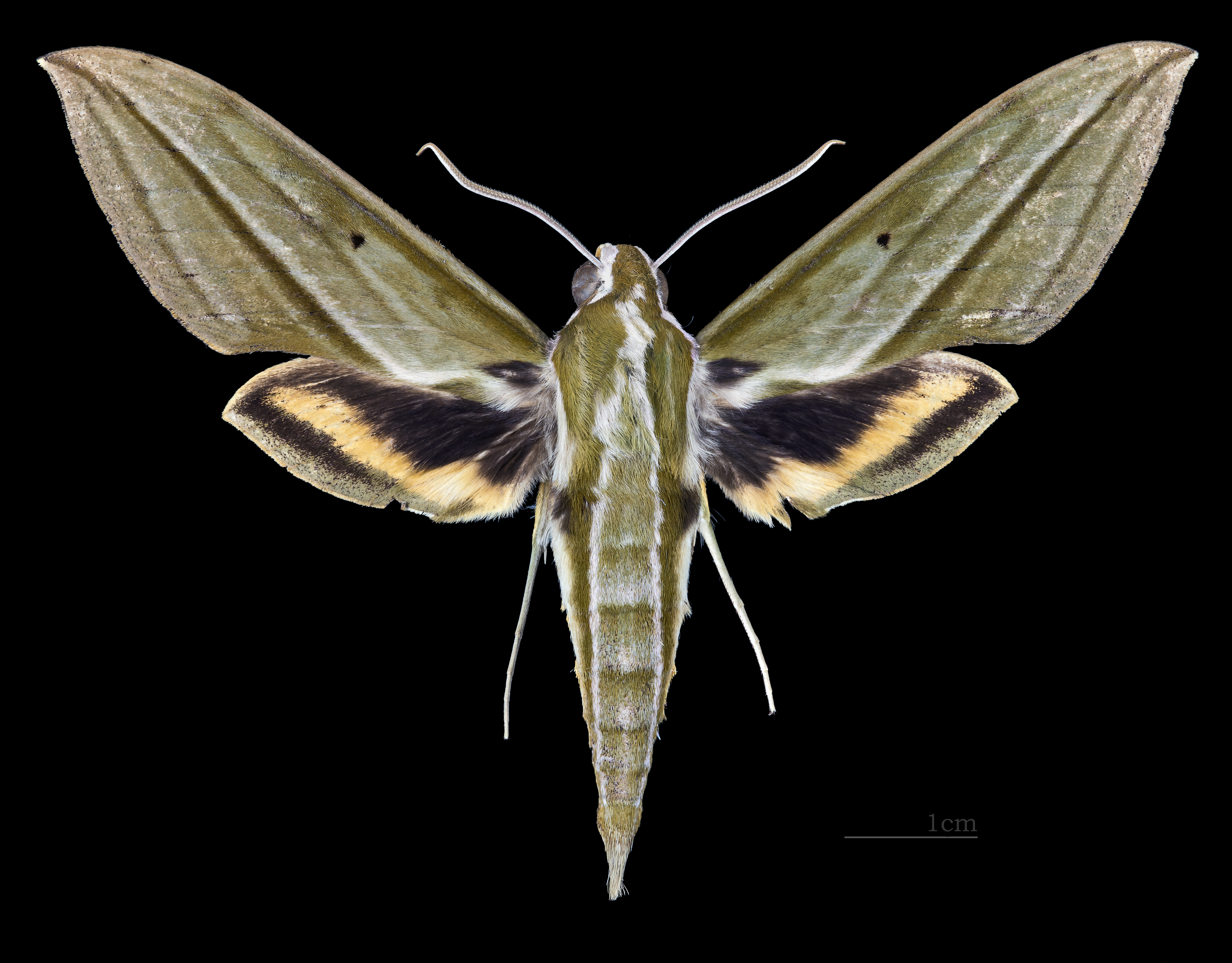
- Cechenena pollux Male dorsal
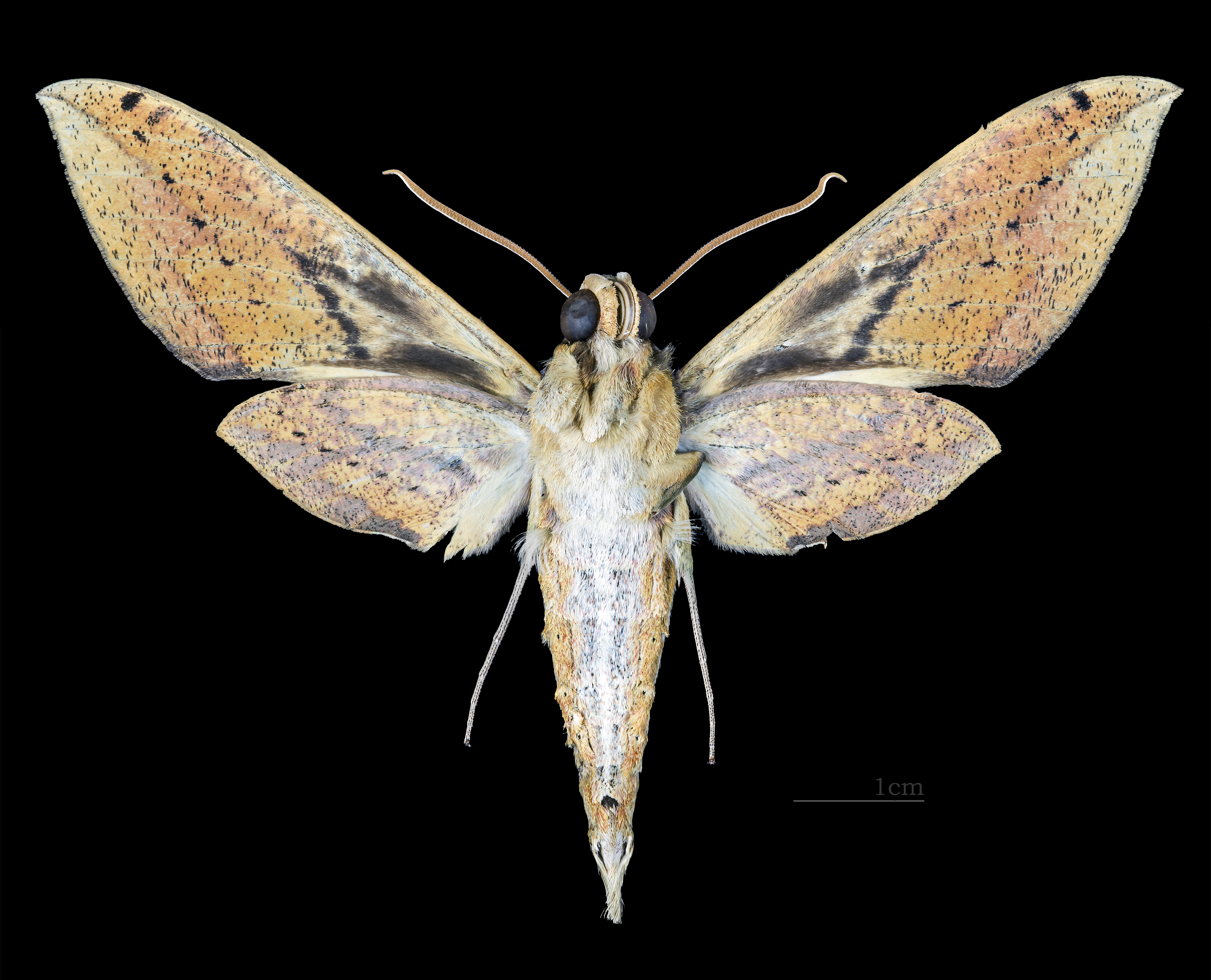
- Cechenena pollux Male ventral

Scientific classification
- Kingdom: Animalia
- Phylum: Arthropoda
- Class: Insecta
- Order: Lepidoptera
- Family: Sphingidae
- Genus: Cechenena
- Species: C. pollux

Binomial name
- Cechenena pollux (Boisduval, 1875)

Synonyms
- Choerocampa pollux Boisduval, 1875; Theretra pseudonessus Rothschild, 1894; Cechenena pollux rubrescens Clark, 1923

= Cechenena pollux =

Species of moth

Cechenena pollux is a moth of the family Sphingidae.

== Distribution ==
It is known from Indonesia (Java).

== Description ==
It is similar to green forms of Cechenena lineosa but the median band of the hindwing upperside is yellow. The forewing ground colour ranges from rust-brown to green.

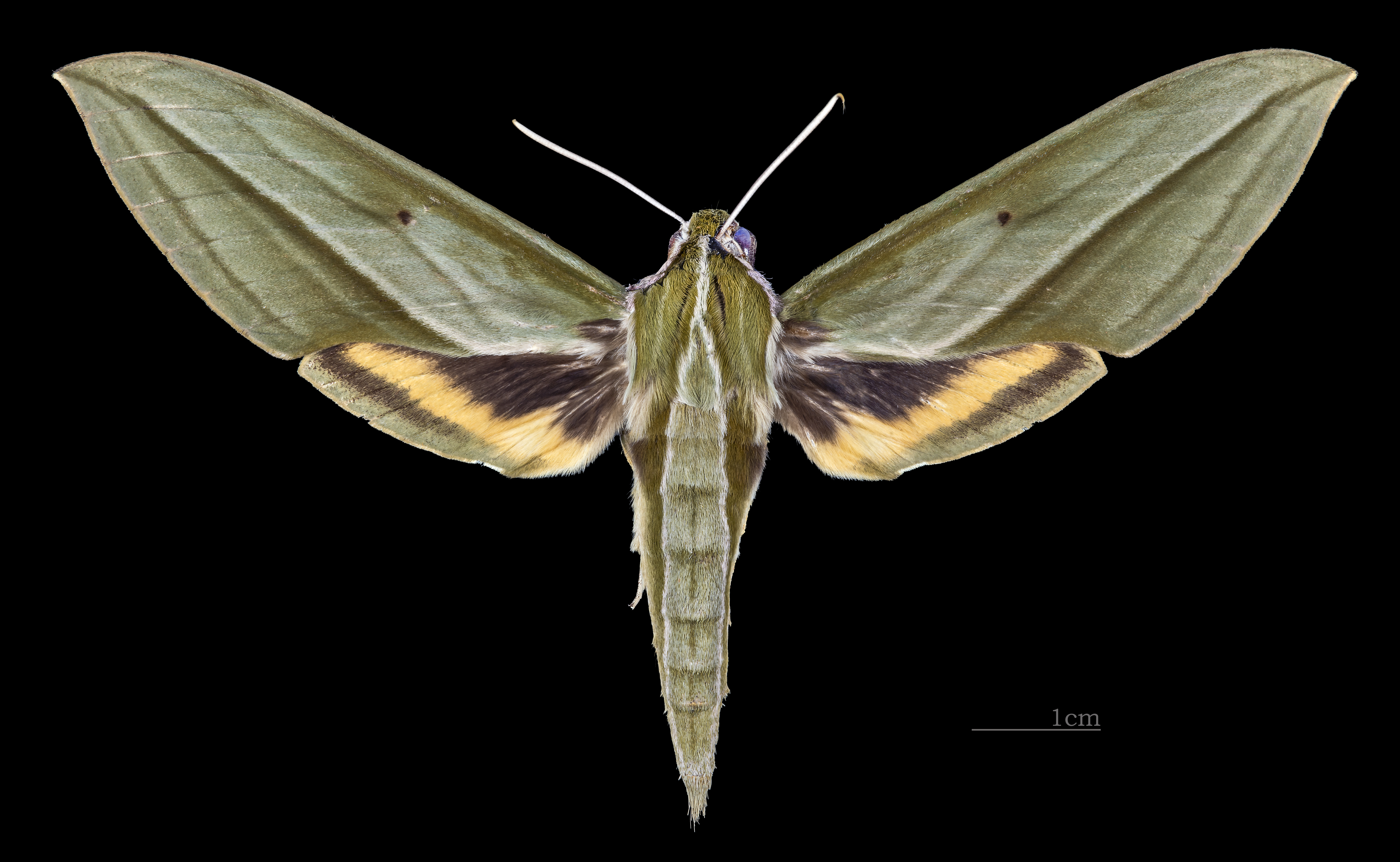
Female dorsal

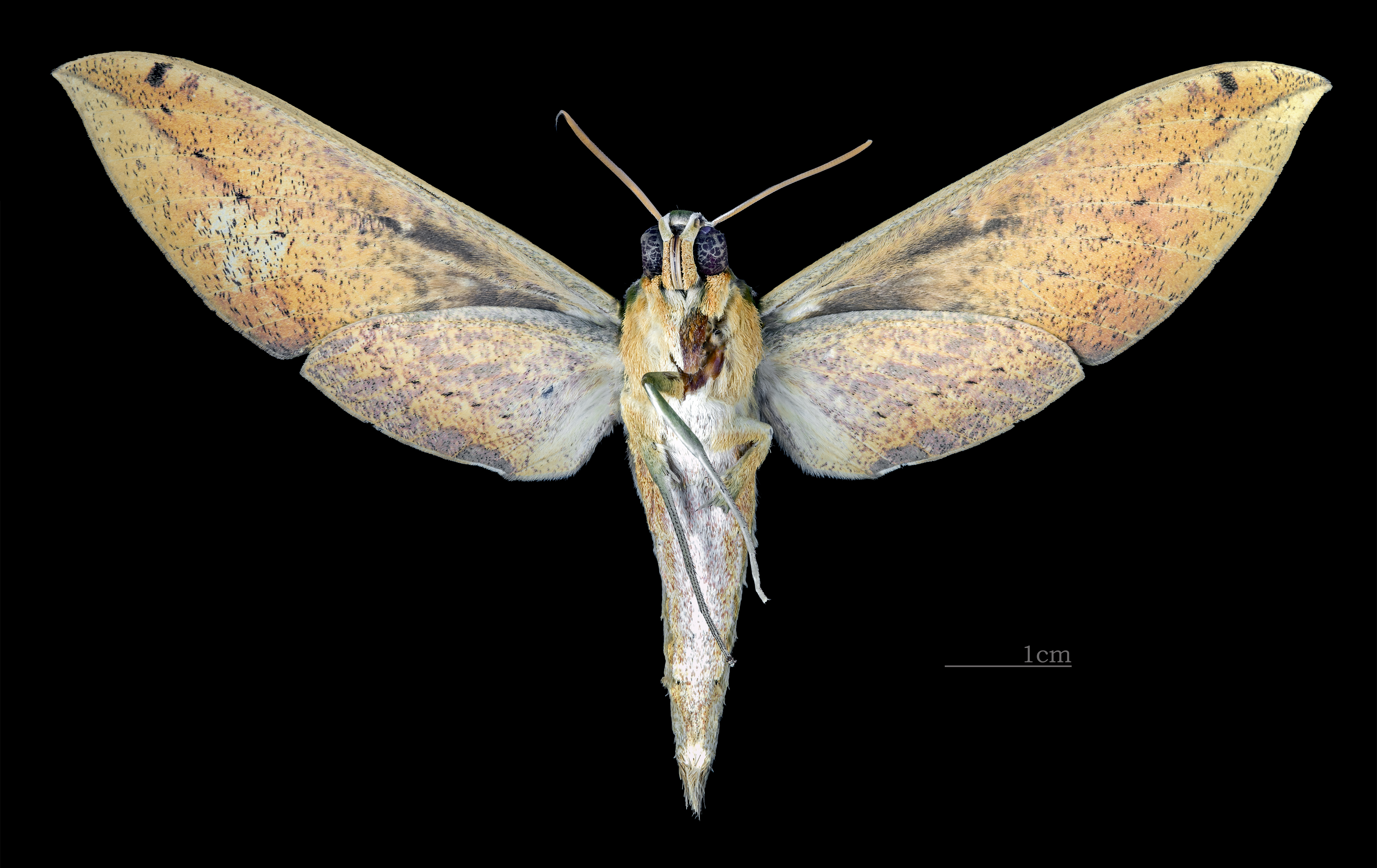
Female ventral
