= Cechenena sperlingi =

Scientific classification
- Kingdom: Animalia
- Phylum: Arthropoda
- Class: Insecta
- Order: Lepidoptera
- Family: Sphingidae
- Genus: Cechenena
- Species: C. sperlingi

Binomial name
- Cechenena sperlingi Eitschberger, 2007

Species of moth

Cechenena sperlingi is a moth of the family Sphingidae. It is known from the Philippines.
