= Cechenena catori =

Scientific classification
- Kingdom: Animalia
- Phylum: Arthropoda
- Class: Insecta
- Order: Lepidoptera
- Family: Sphingidae
- Genus: Cechenena
- Species: C. catori

Binomial name
- Cechenena catori (Rothschild, 1894)

Synonyms
- Theretra catori Rothschild, 1894

Species of moth

Cechenena catori is a moth of the family Sphingidae that occurs in Indonesia. They are nocturnal.
