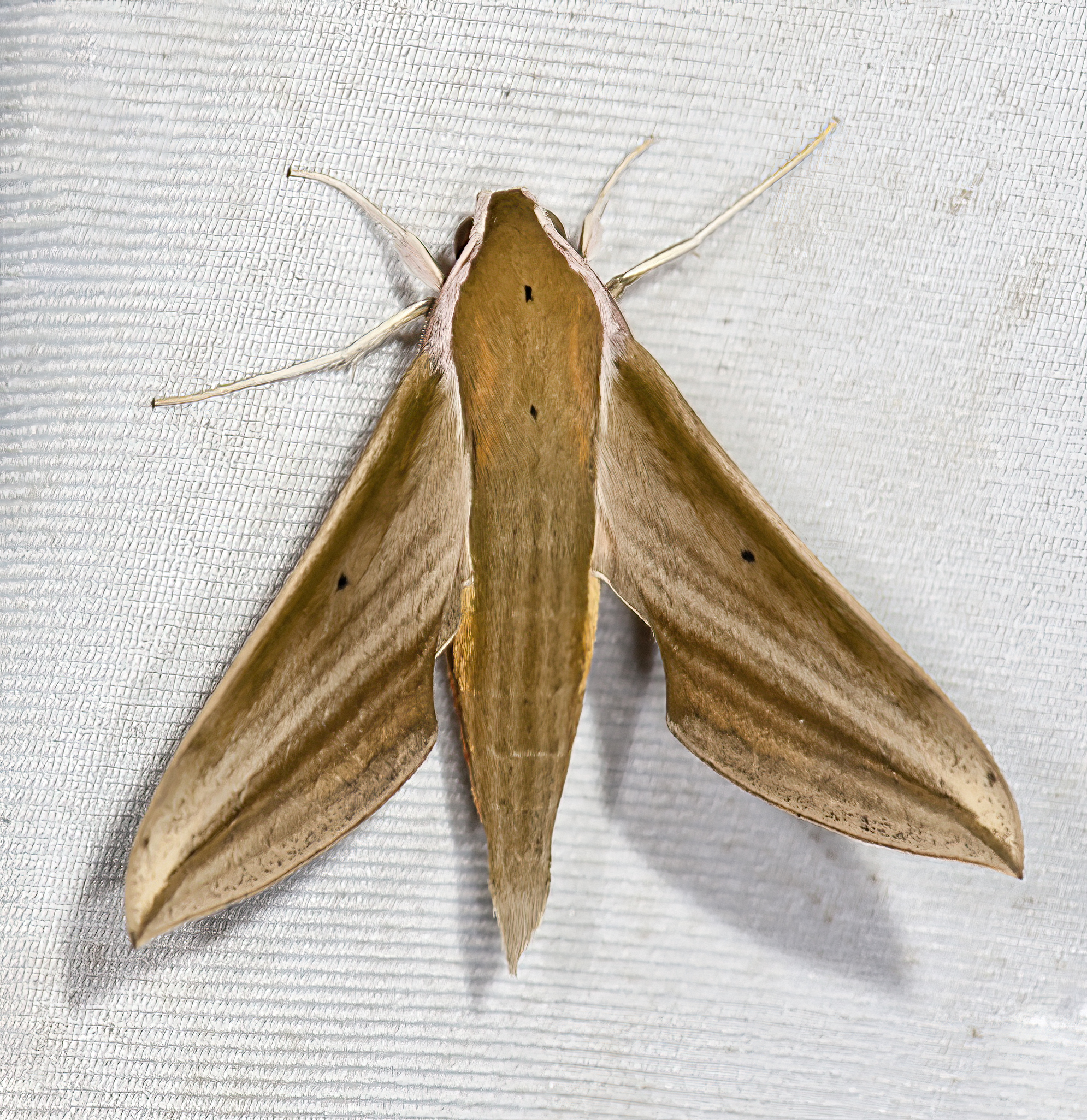

Scientific classification
- Kingdom: Animalia
- Phylum: Arthropoda
- Clade: Pancrustacea
- Class: Insecta
- Order: Lepidoptera
- Family: Sphingidae
- Genus: Cechetra
- Species: C. minor

Binomial name
- Cechetra minor (Butler, 1875)

Synonyms
- Chaerocampa minor Butler, 1875; Theretra striata Rothschild, 1894; Cechenena minor (Butler, 1875); Cechenena minor olivascens (Mell, 1922)

= Cechetra minor =

Species of moth

Cechetra minor, the lesser green hawkmoth, is a moth of the family Sphingidae.

== Distribution ==
It is known from northern India, Nepal, Thailand, eastern and southern China, Taiwan, southern Japan and Vietnam.

== Description ==
The wingspan is 90–98 mm. The upperside of the thorax is lacking a pale medial band. There are seven postmedian lines on the forewing upperside and seven lines on the distal half of the wing. The forewing underside ground colour is orange-beige.

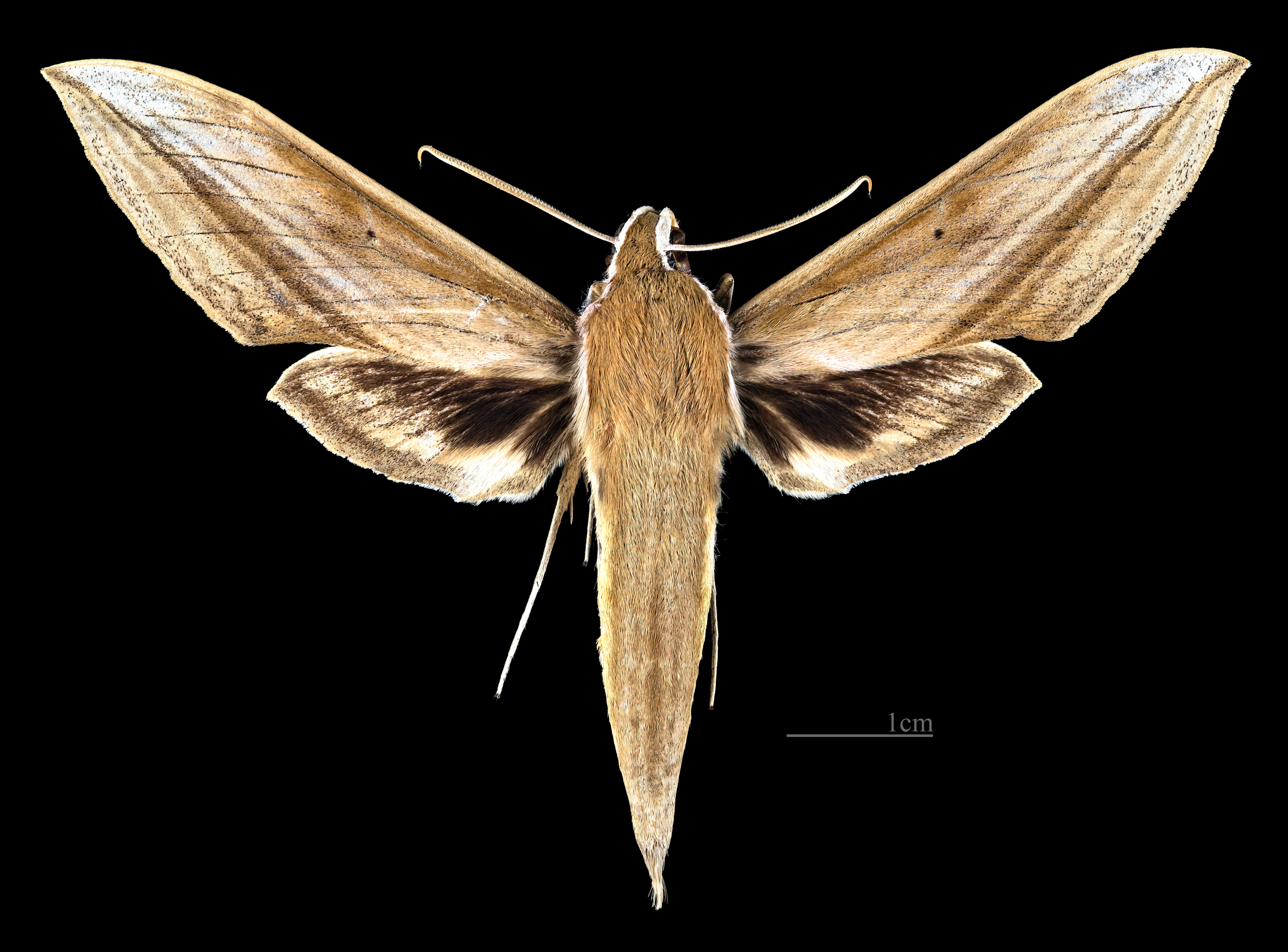
Cechenena minor ♂

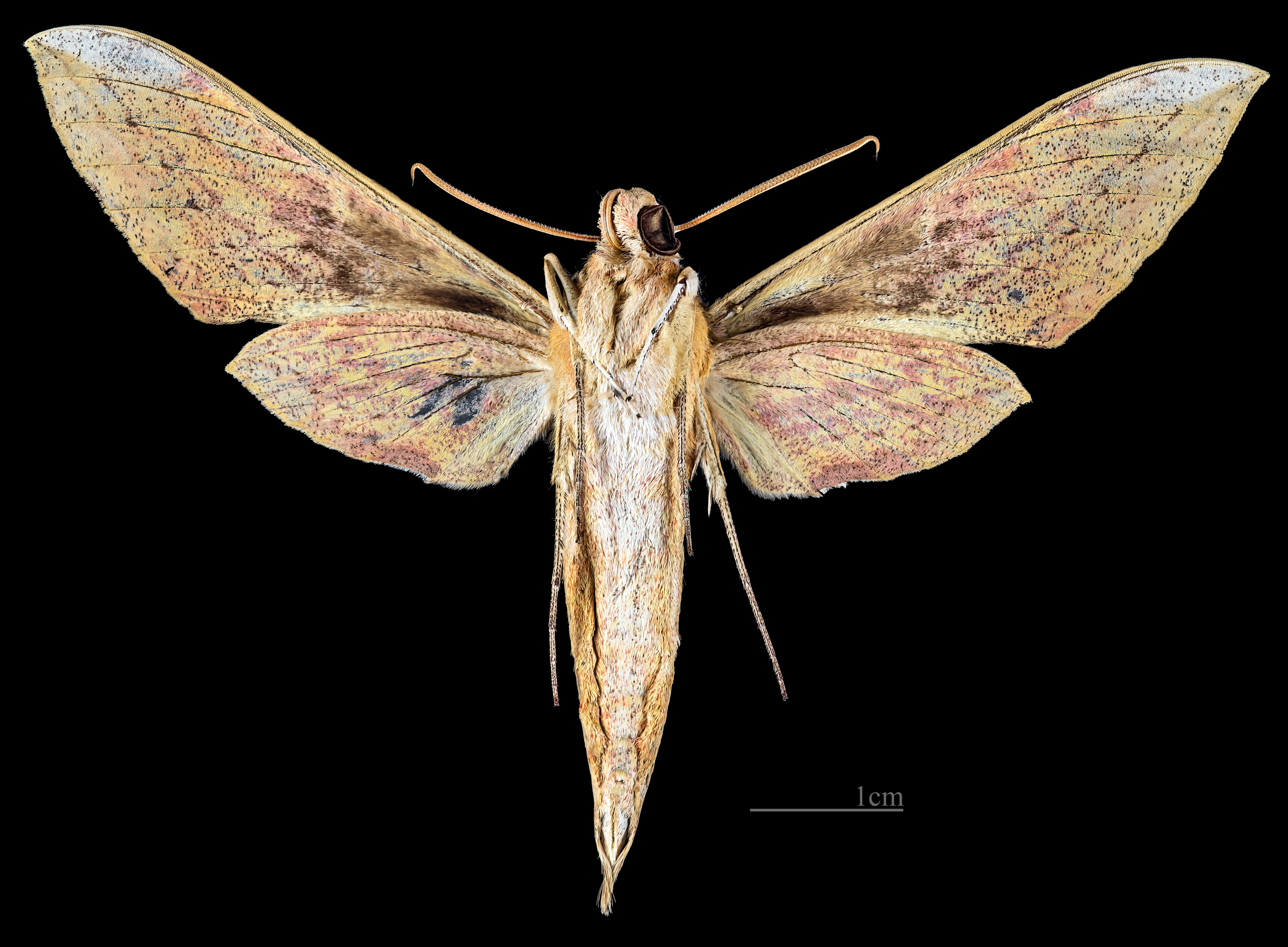
Cechenena minor ♂ △

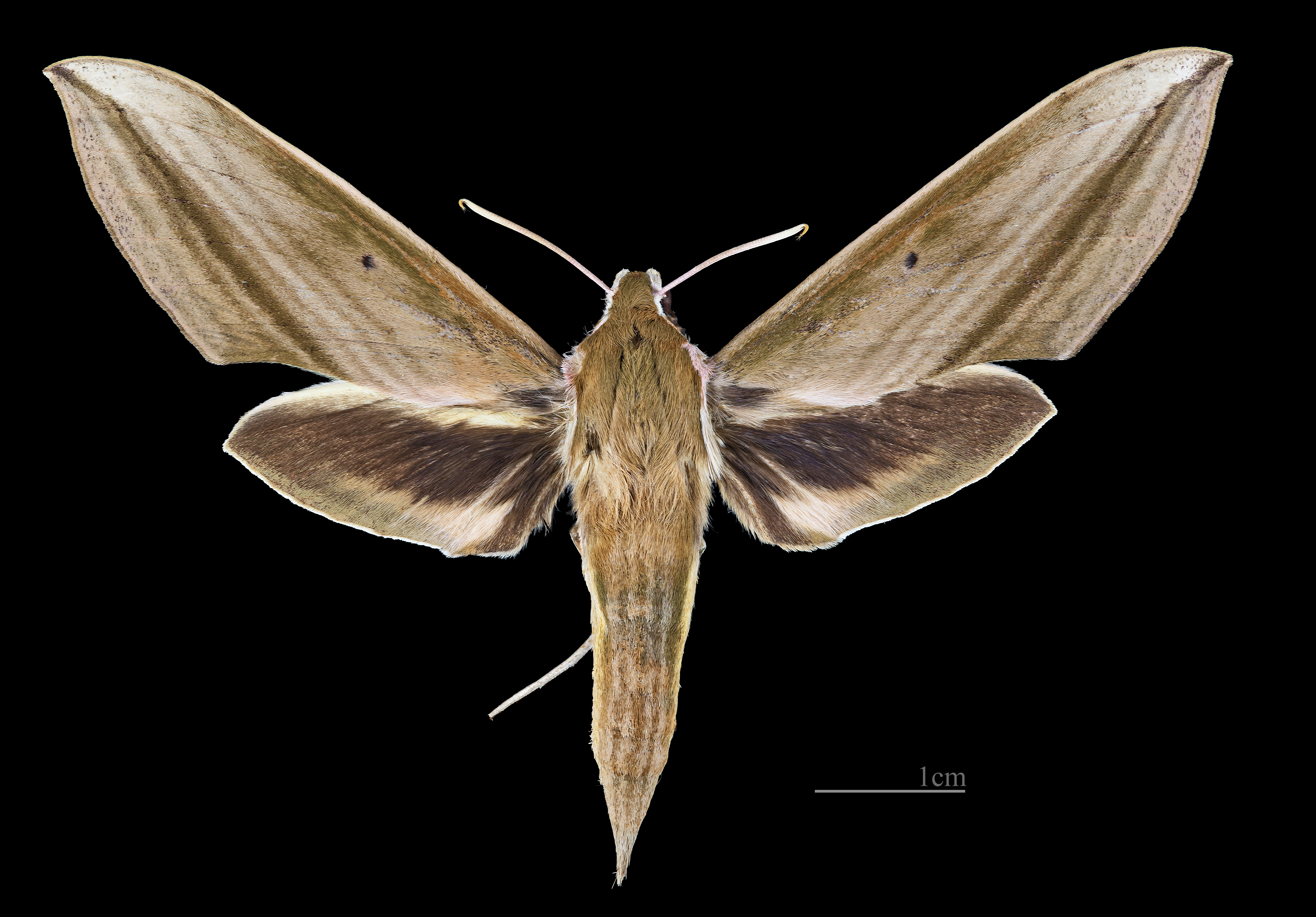
Cechenena minor ♀

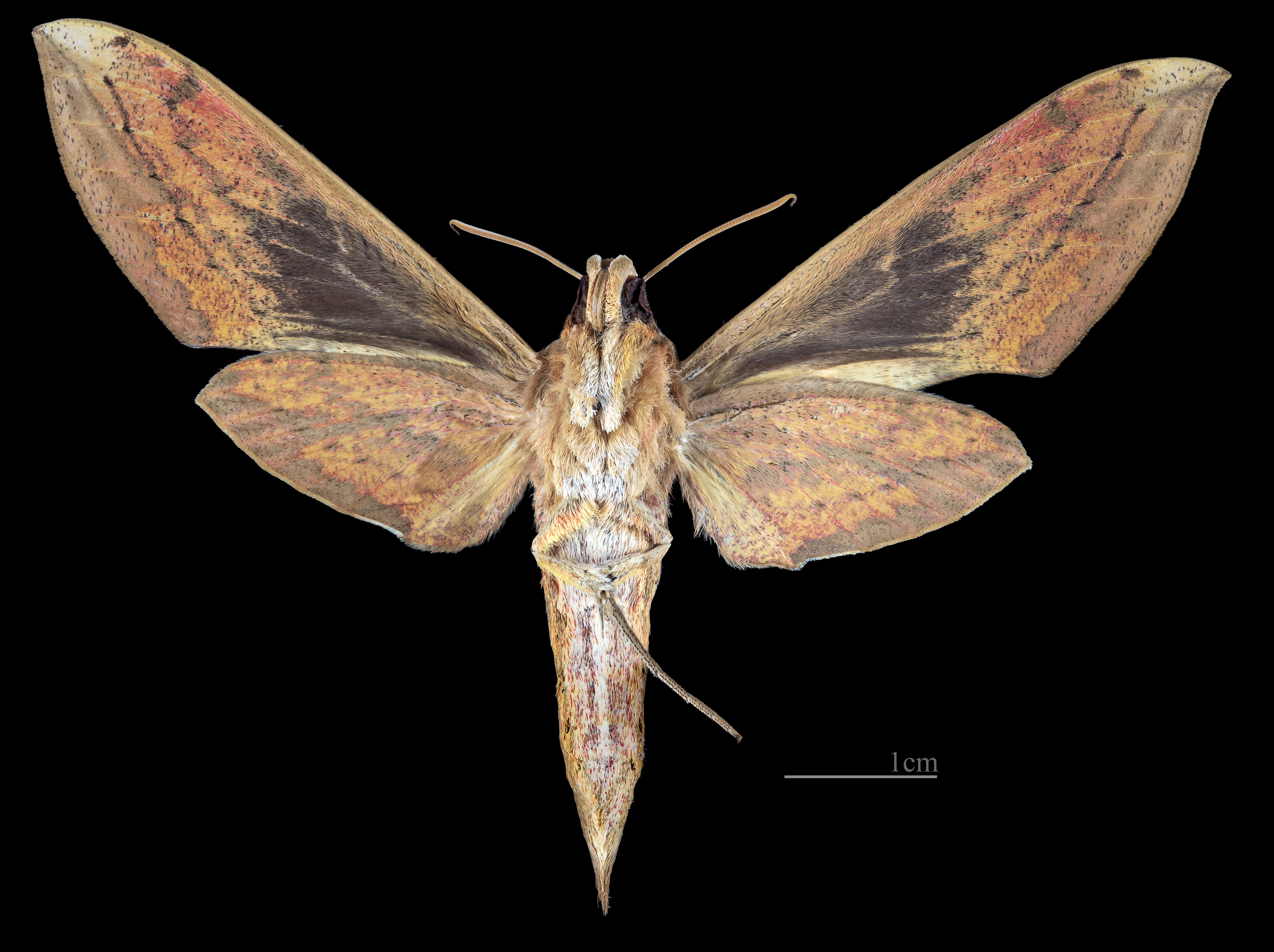
Cechenena minor ♀ △

== Biology ==
The larvae have been recorded feeding on Saurauia pundiana, Vitis and Amorphophallus species in India and Cayratia japonica in China.
