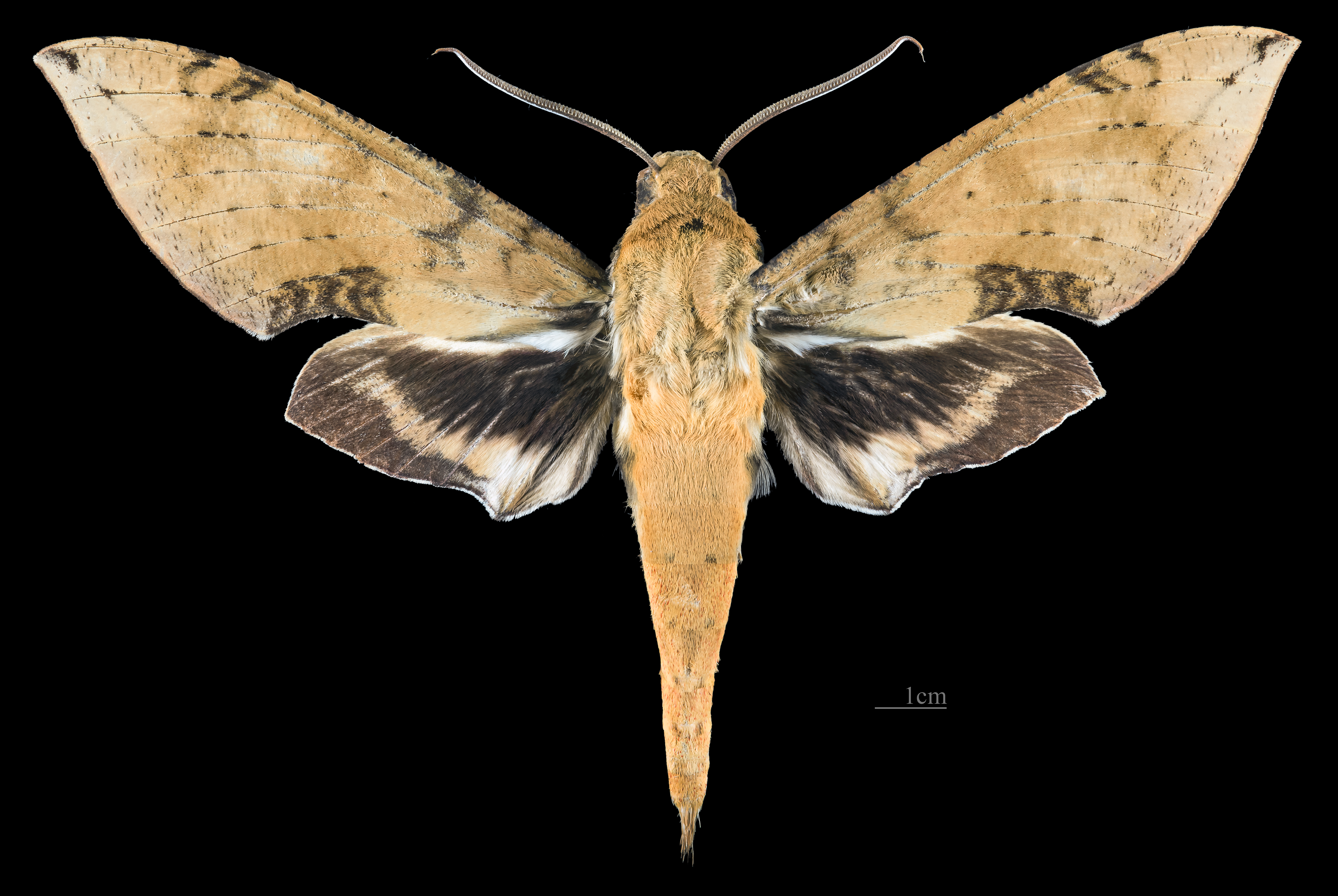
- Male dorsal
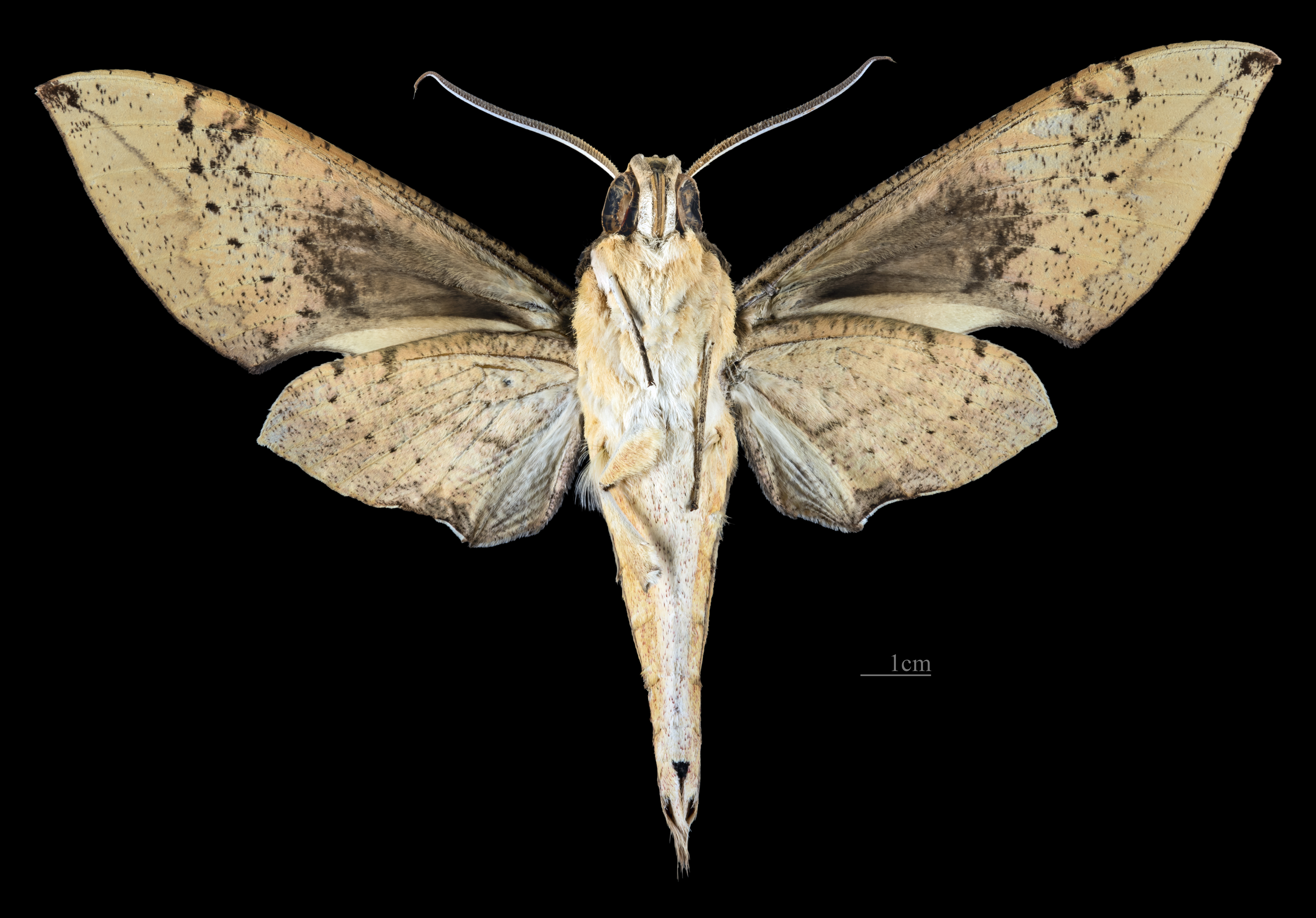
- Male ventral

Scientific classification
- Kingdom: Animalia
- Phylum: Arthropoda
- Class: Insecta
- Order: Lepidoptera
- Family: Sphingidae
- Genus: Cechenena
- Species: C. aegrota

Binomial name
- Cechenena aegrota (Butler, 1875)

Synonyms
- Pergesa aegrota Butler, 1875; Cechenena albicosta Tutt, 1904; Cechenena aegrota occidentalis Clark, 1935

= Cechenena aegrota =

Species of moth

Cechenena aegrota, the mottled green hawkmoth, is a species of moth in the family Sphingidae. It was described by Arthur Gardiner Butler in 1875. It is known from Nepal, north-eastern India (Sikkim, Meghalaya), Bangladesh, Thailand, Laos, southern China (Hainan, Hong Kong) and Vietnam.

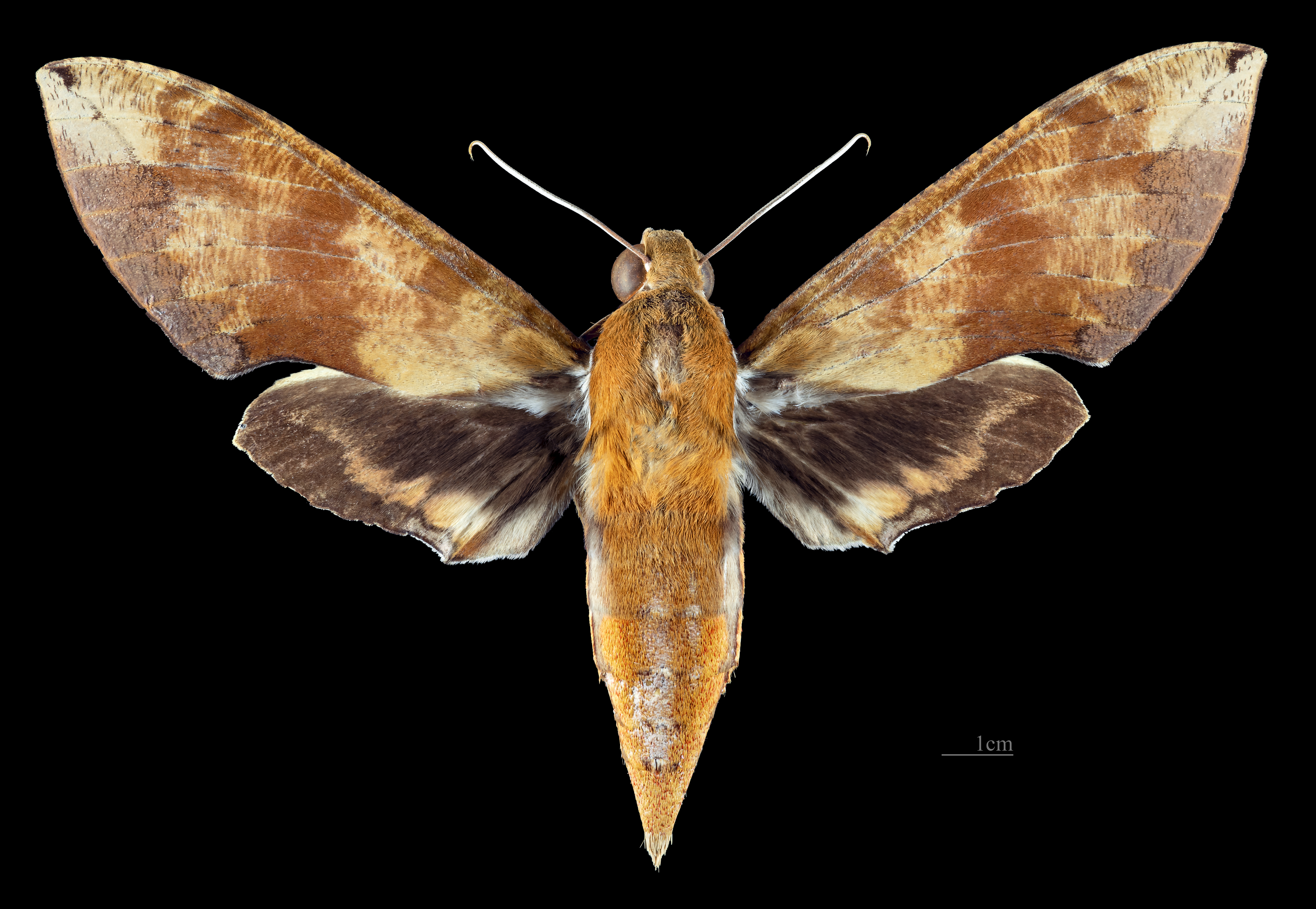
Female dorsal

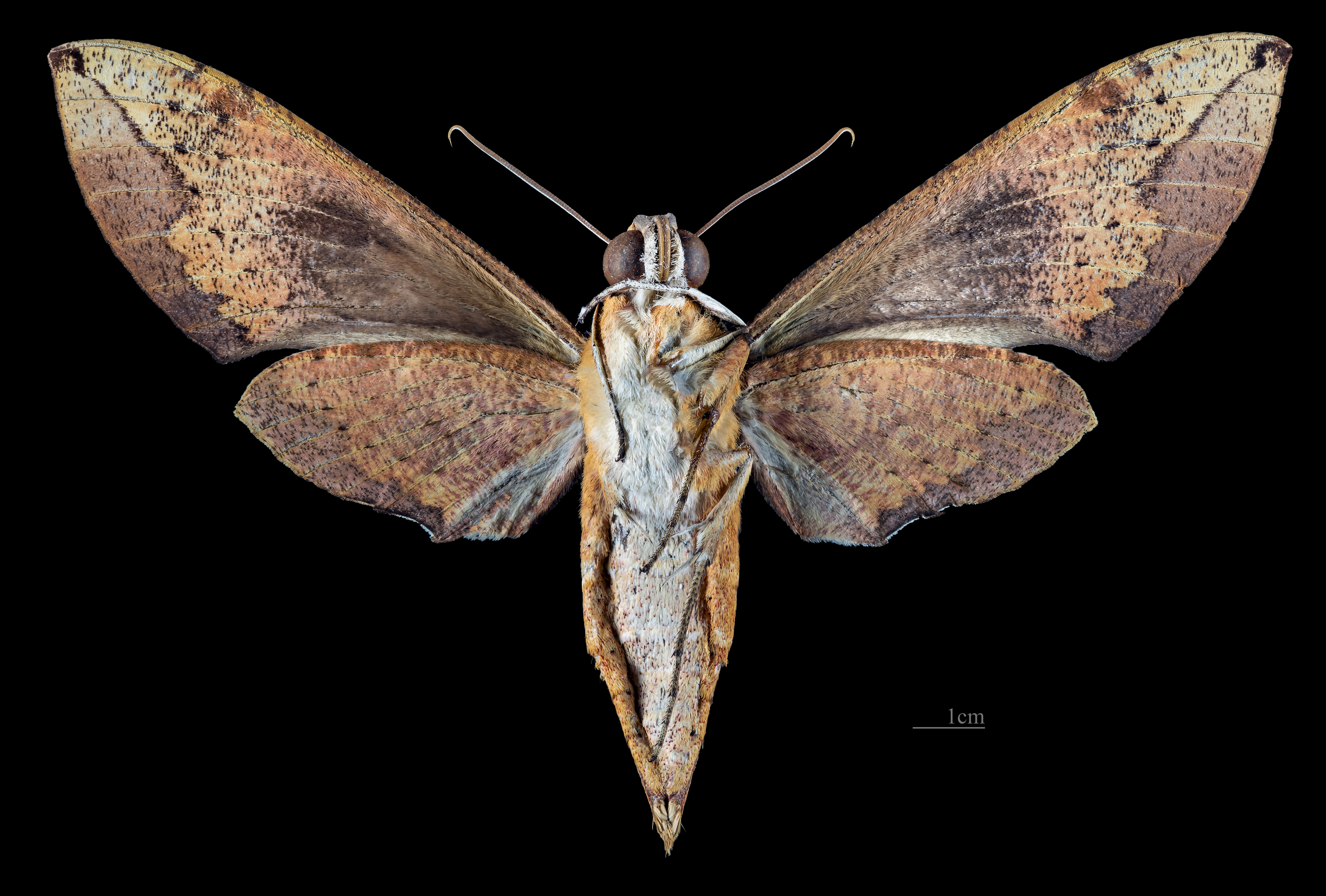
Female ventral

Males in this species have a wingspan of 72-76 millimetres, while females have a wingspan of 88-92 millimetres. This species is sexually dichromatic, with females being darker and browner than males. Adults are on wing from March to December, with a main peak in April in Hong Kong.

The larvae feed on Psychotria species.

== Subspecies ==
- Cechenena aegrota aegrota
- Cechenena aegrota kueppersi Eitschberger, 2007 (northern Vietnam)
