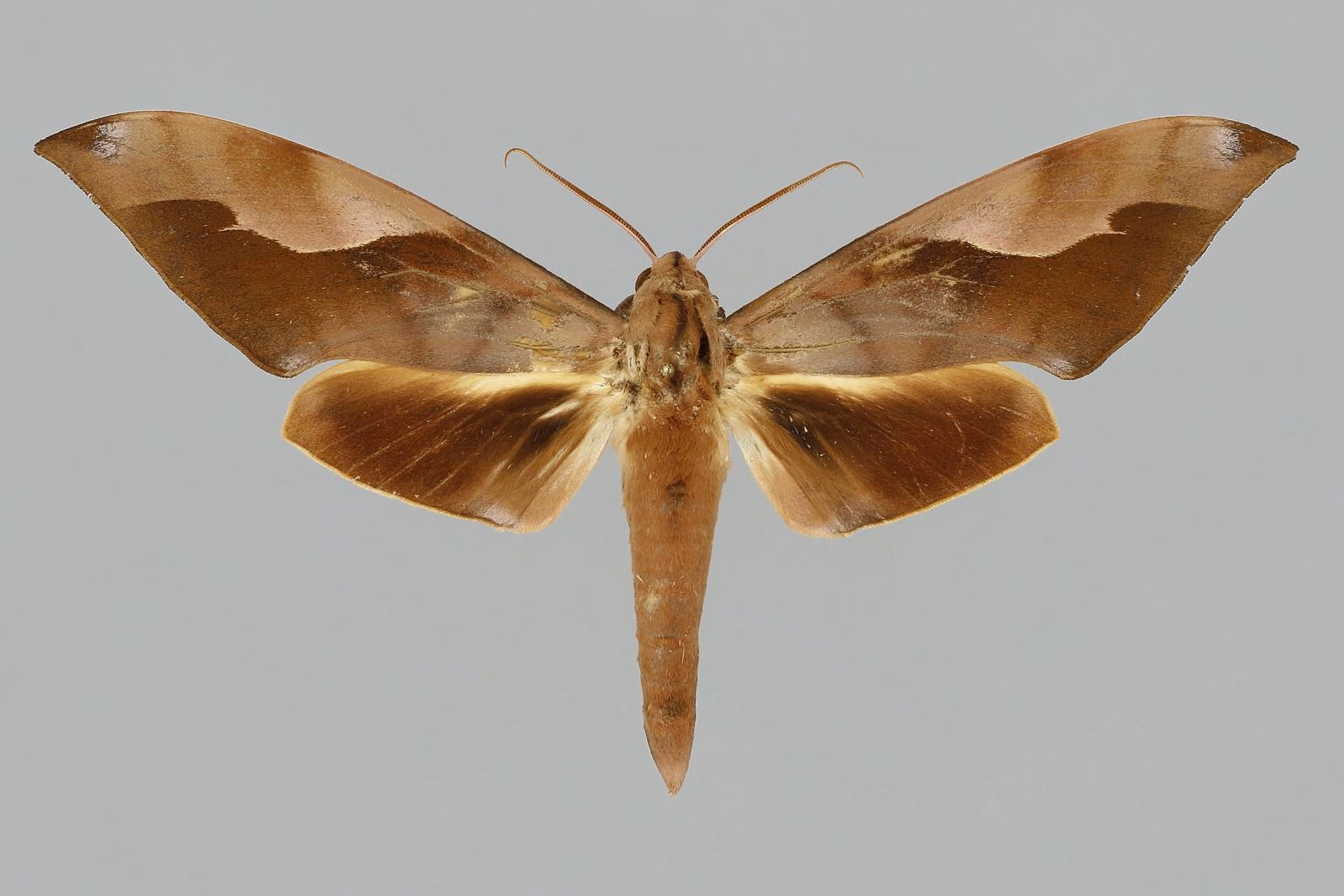
- Male

Scientific classification
- Domain: Eukaryota
- Kingdom: Animalia
- Phylum: Arthropoda
- Class: Insecta
- Order: Lepidoptera
- Family: Sphingidae
- Genus: Clanis
- Species: C. surigaoensis

Binomial name
- Clanis surigaoensis Clark, 1928

= Clanis surigaoensis =

Species of moth

Clanis surigaoensis is a species of moth of the family Sphingidae. It is known from the Philippines.

The wingspan is about 78 mm. It is very similar to Clanis titan but the forewing apex is more attenuated and slightly falcate. There is a large cinnamon-coloured costal patch on forewing upperside.
