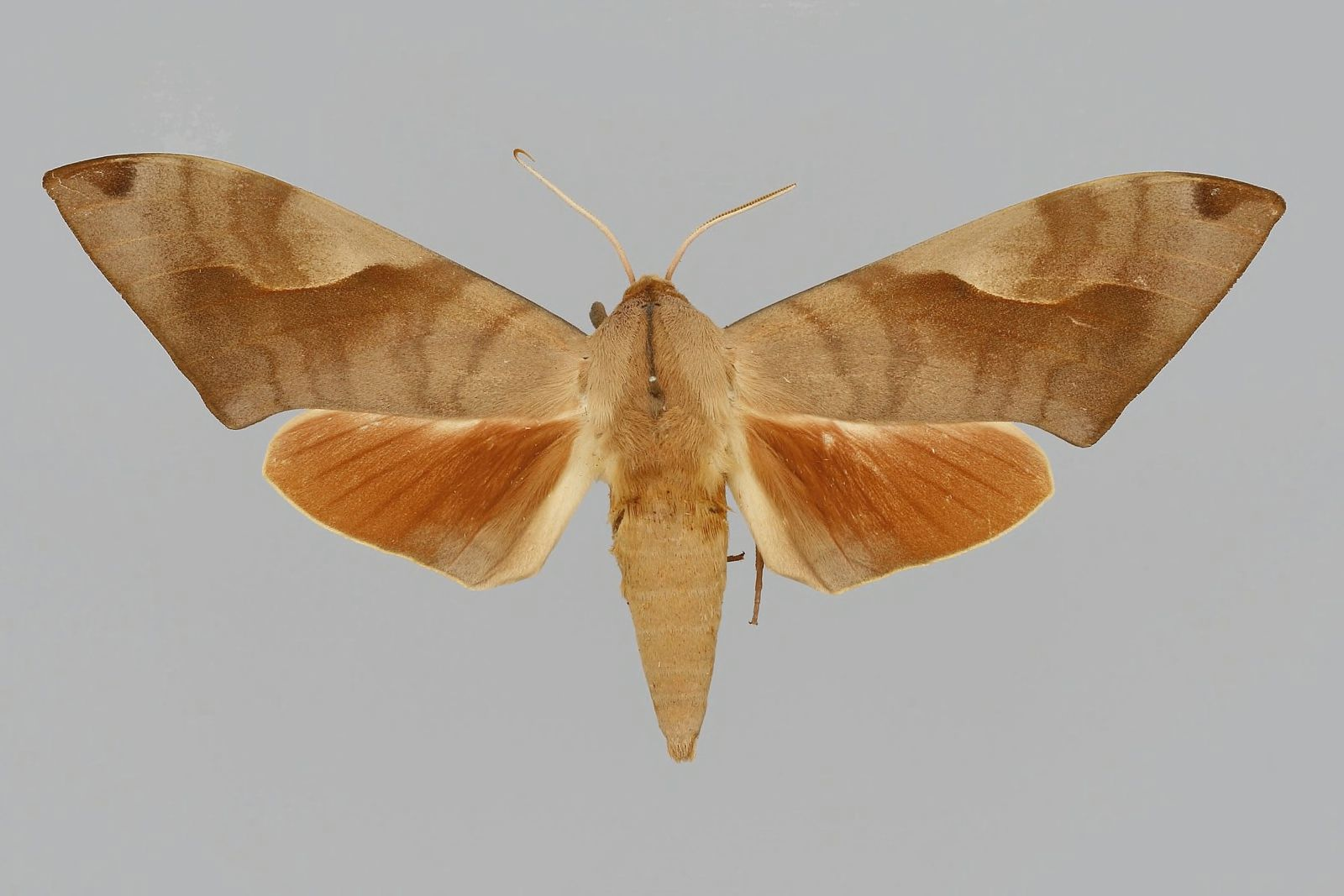

Scientific classification
- Domain: Eukaryota
- Kingdom: Animalia
- Phylum: Arthropoda
- Class: Insecta
- Order: Lepidoptera
- Family: Sphingidae
- Genus: Clanis
- Species: C. phalaris

Binomial name
- Clanis phalaris (Cramer, 1777)

Synonyms
- Sphinx phalaris Cramer, 1777; Sphinx pagana Fabricius, 1781; Sphinx nicobarensis Schwarz, 1793; Basiana cervina Walker, 1856

= Clanis phalaris =

Species of moth

Clanis phalaris is a species of moth of the family Sphingidae. It is found in north-eastern and southern India, Sri Lanka, the Andaman Islands and northern Thailand.

== Subspecies ==
- Clanis phalaris phalaris
- Clanis phalaris cottoni Kitching & Haxaire, 2004 (Thailand)
