= Clanis baratana =

Scientific classification
- Kingdom: Animalia
- Phylum: Arthropoda
- Class: Insecta
- Order: Lepidoptera
- Family: Sphingidae
- Genus: Clanis
- Species: C. baratana

Binomial name
- Clanis baratana Brechlin, 1998

Species of moth

Clanis baratana is a species of moth of the family Sphingidae. It is found in Indonesia.
