= Clanis mcguirei =

Scientific classification
- Kingdom: Animalia
- Phylum: Arthropoda
- Class: Insecta
- Order: Lepidoptera
- Family: Sphingidae
- Genus: Clanis
- Species: C. mcguirei

Binomial name
- Clanis mcguirei Eitschberger, 2004

Species of moth

Clanis mcguirei is a species of moth of the family Sphingidae. It is known from Thailand.
