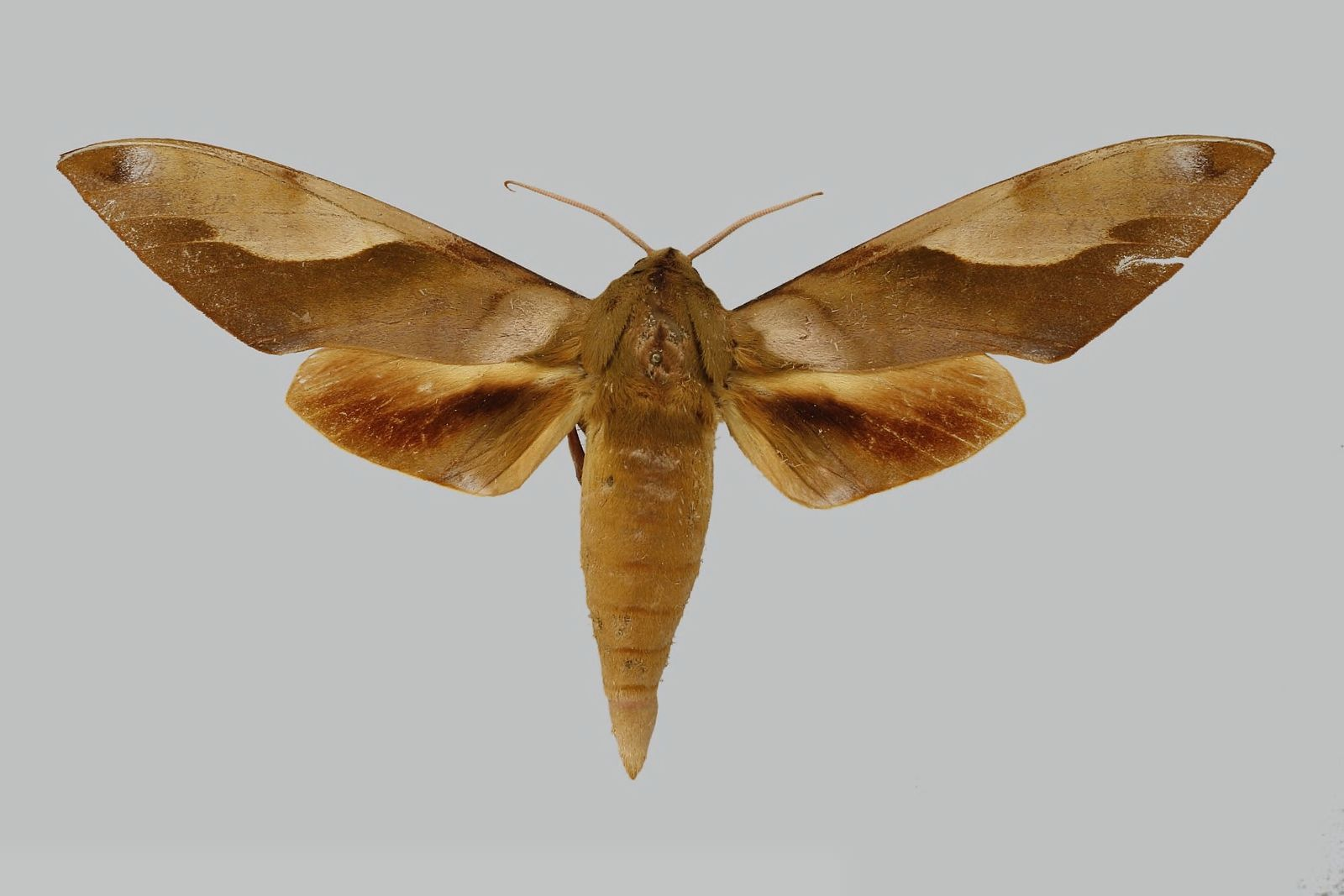
- Male

Scientific classification
- Domain: Eukaryota
- Kingdom: Animalia
- Phylum: Arthropoda
- Class: Insecta
- Order: Lepidoptera
- Family: Sphingidae
- Genus: Clanis
- Species: C. orhanti

Binomial name
- Clanis orhanti Haxaire, 2001

= Clanis orhanti =

Species of moth

Clanis orhanti is a species of moth of the family Sphingidae. It is known from Peninsular Malaysia and Sumatra.
