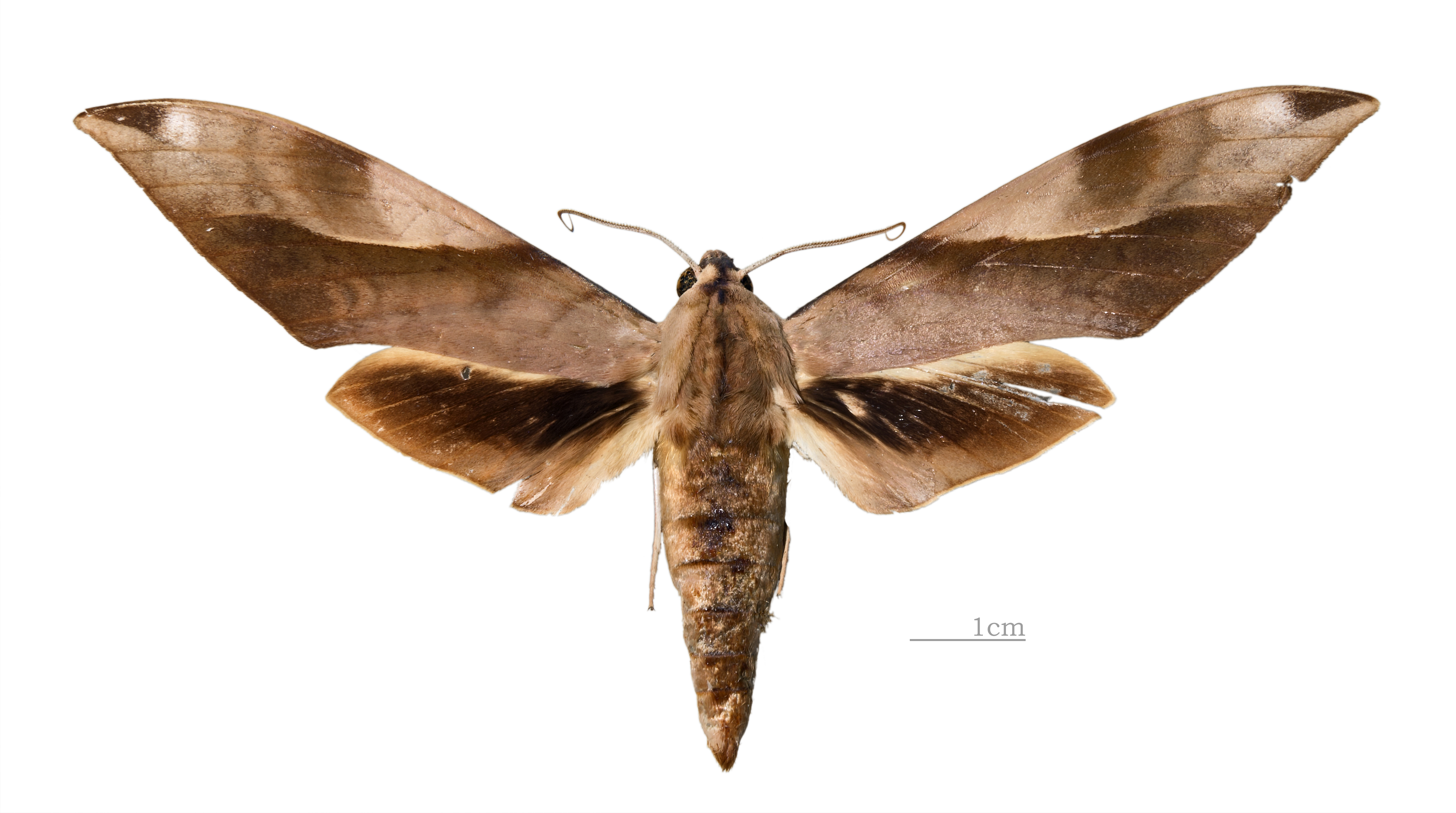
- Clanis schwartzi Paratype MHNT Male Dorsal
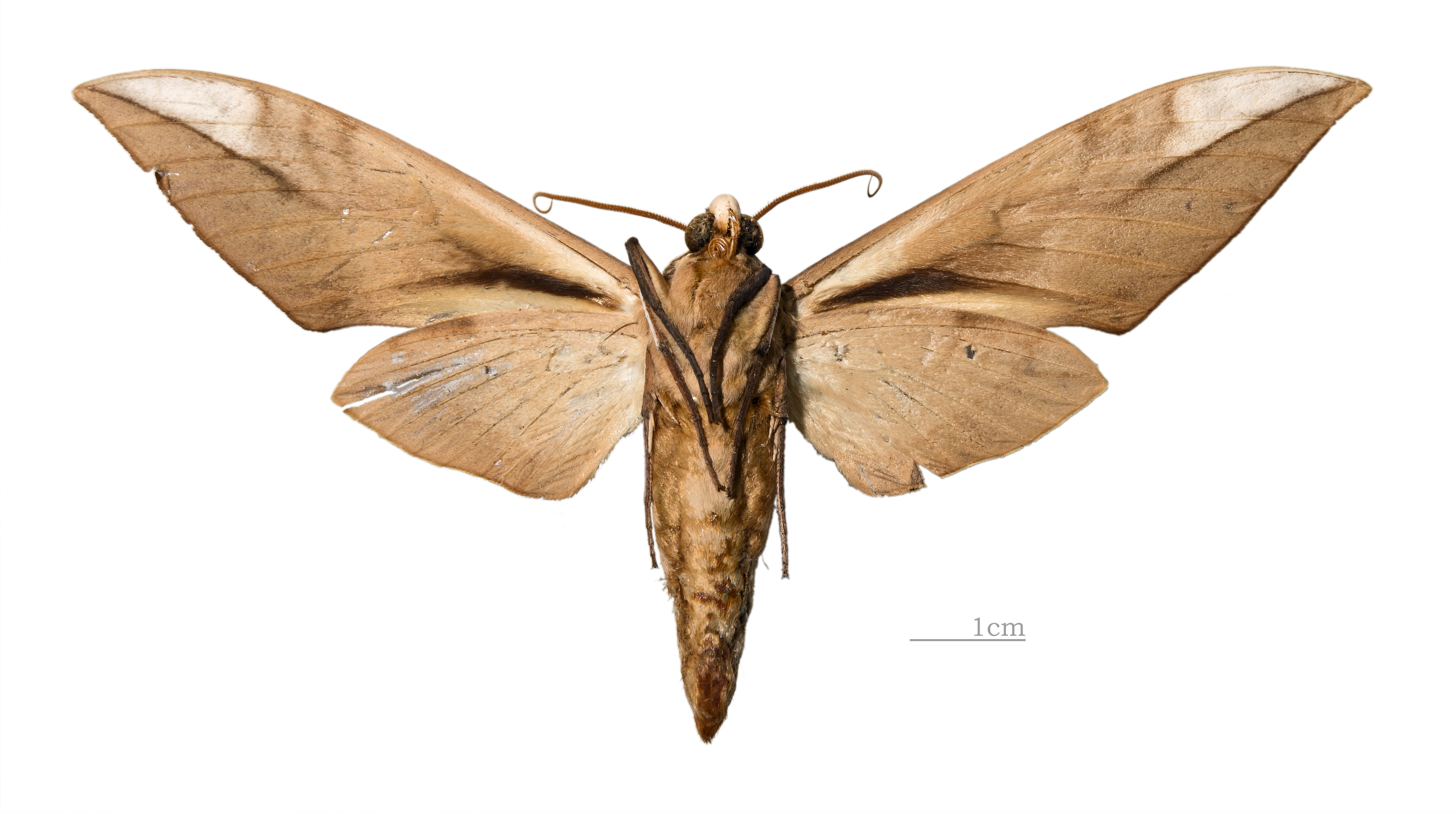
- Clanis schwartzi Paratype MHNT Male Ventral

Scientific classification
- Kingdom: Animalia
- Phylum: Arthropoda
- Clade: Pancrustacea
- Class: Insecta
- Order: Lepidoptera
- Family: Sphingidae
- Genus: Clanis
- Species: C. schwartzi

Binomial name
- Clanis schwartzi Cadiou, 1993

Synonyms
- Clanis bilineata acuta (Mell, 1922)

= Clanis schwartzi =

Species of moth

Clanis schwartzi is a species of moth of the family Sphingidae. It is found from central and southern China to northern Laos and northern Vietnam.

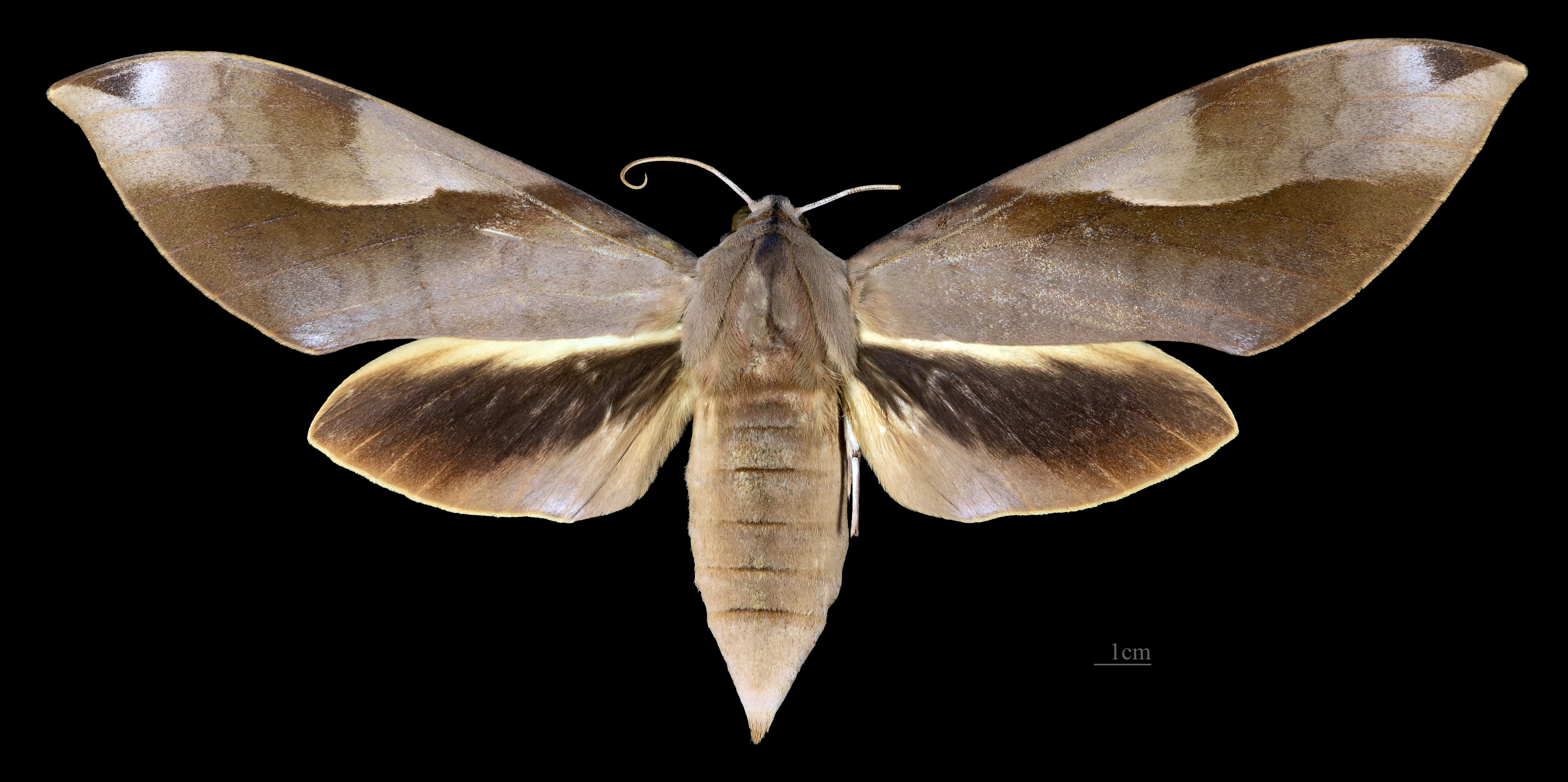
Clanis schwartzi Paratype MHNT Female Dorsal

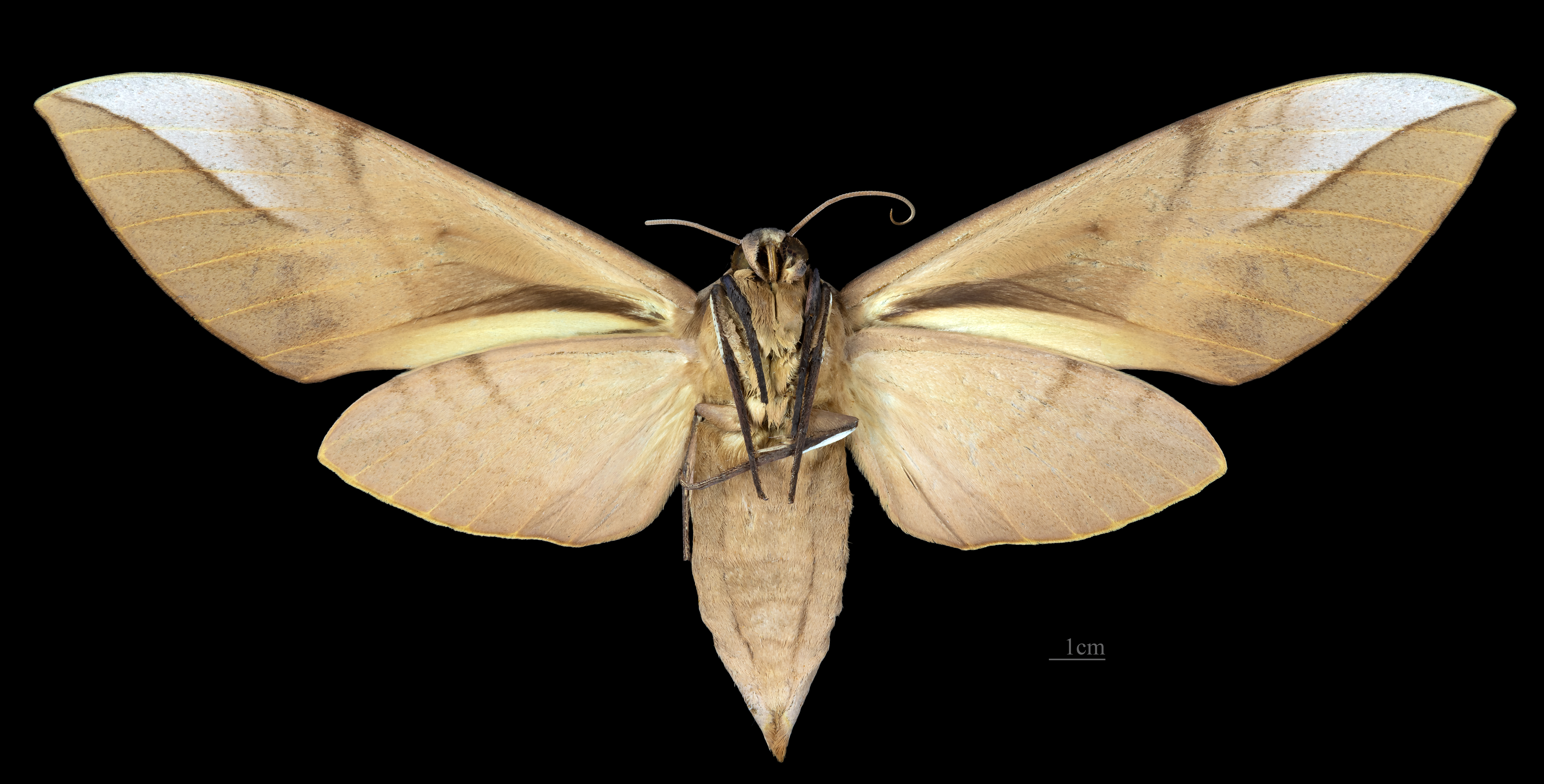
Clanis schwartzi Paratype MHNT Female Ventral
