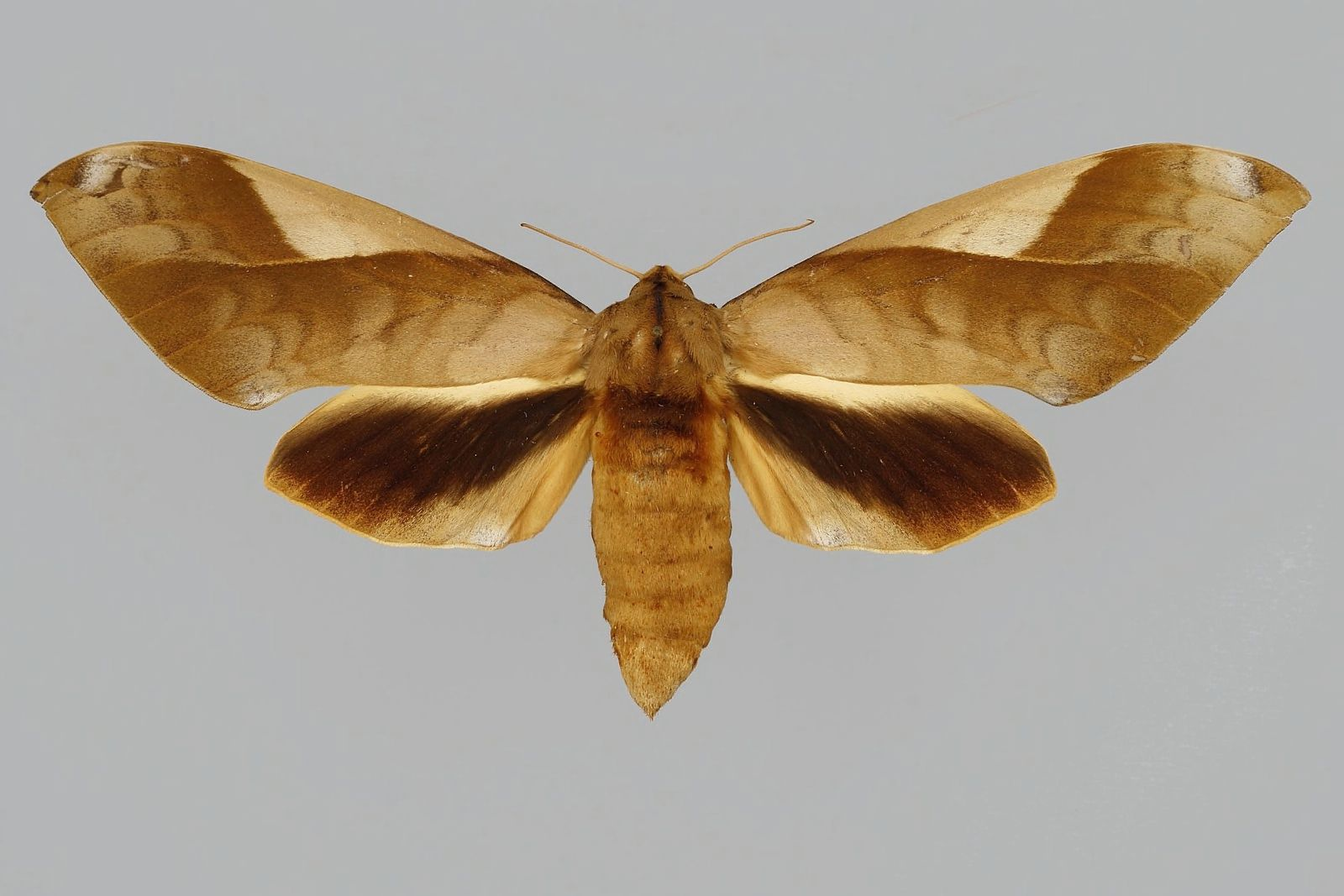
- Female

Scientific classification
- Domain: Eukaryota
- Kingdom: Animalia
- Phylum: Arthropoda
- Class: Insecta
- Order: Lepidoptera
- Family: Sphingidae
- Genus: Clanis
- Species: C. stenosema

Binomial name
- Clanis stenosema Rothschild & Jordan, 1907

Synonyms
- Clanis brooksi Rothschild, 1920

= Clanis stenosema =

Species of moth

Clanis stenosema is a species of moth of the family Sphingidae first described by Rothschild and Jordan in 1907. It is known from Nias, Sumatra, Java, Borneo and the Philippines.
