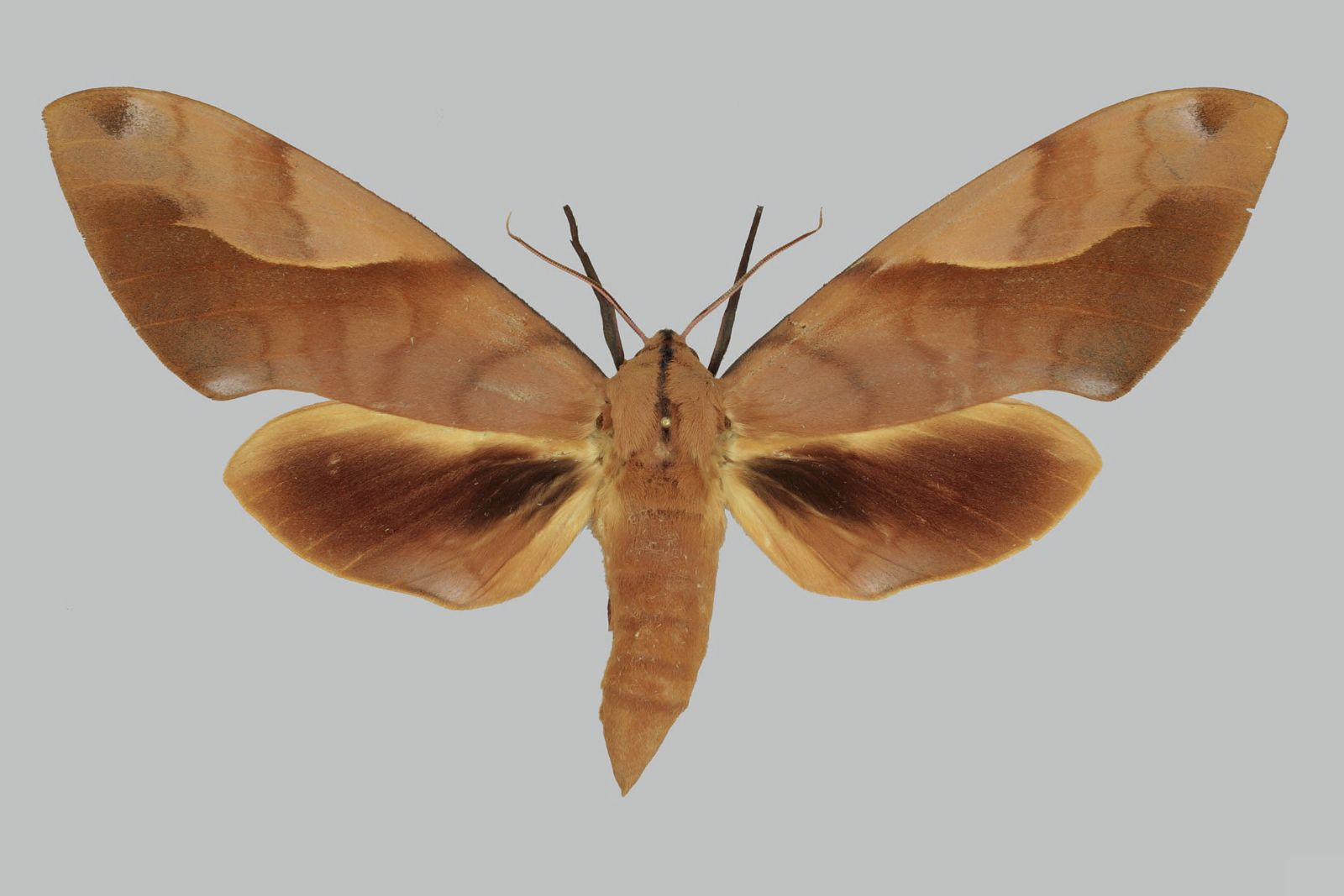
- Female

Scientific classification
- Domain: Eukaryota
- Kingdom: Animalia
- Phylum: Arthropoda
- Class: Insecta
- Order: Lepidoptera
- Family: Sphingidae
- Genus: Clanis
- Species: C. negritensis

Binomial name
- Clanis negritensis Hogenes & Treadaway, 1993

= Clanis negritensis =

Species of moth

Clanis negritensis is a species of moth of the family Sphingidae. It is known from the Philippines.
