= Clanis peterseni =

Scientific classification
- Kingdom: Animalia
- Phylum: Arthropoda
- Class: Insecta
- Order: Lepidoptera
- Family: Sphingidae
- Genus: Clanis
- Species: C. peterseni

Binomial name
- Clanis peterseni Eitschberger, 2004

Species of moth

Clanis peterseni is a species of moth of the family Sphingidae. It is known from the Philippines.
