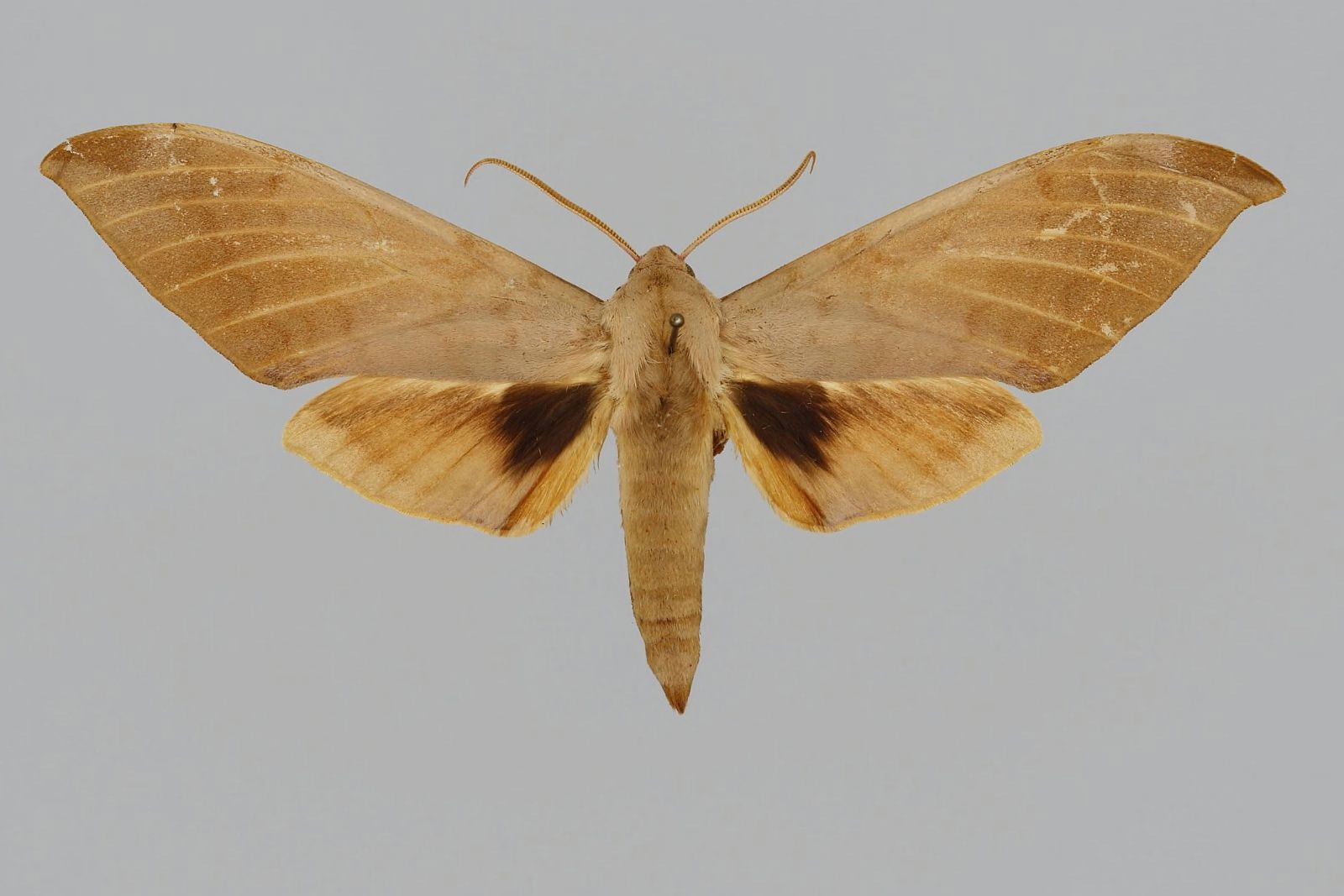
- Male

Scientific classification
- Domain: Eukaryota
- Kingdom: Animalia
- Phylum: Arthropoda
- Class: Insecta
- Order: Lepidoptera
- Family: Sphingidae
- Genus: Clanis
- Species: C. deucalion

Binomial name
- Clanis deucalion (Walker, 1856)

Synonyms
- Basiana deucalion Walker, 1856

= Clanis deucalion =

Species of moth

Clanis deucalion, the three-lined velvet hawkmoth, is a species of moth of the family Sphingidae. It is found from northern India and Nepal to central eastern China.

The wingspan is 104–124 mm.

Larvae have been recorded feeding on the introduced Robinia pseudoacacia.
