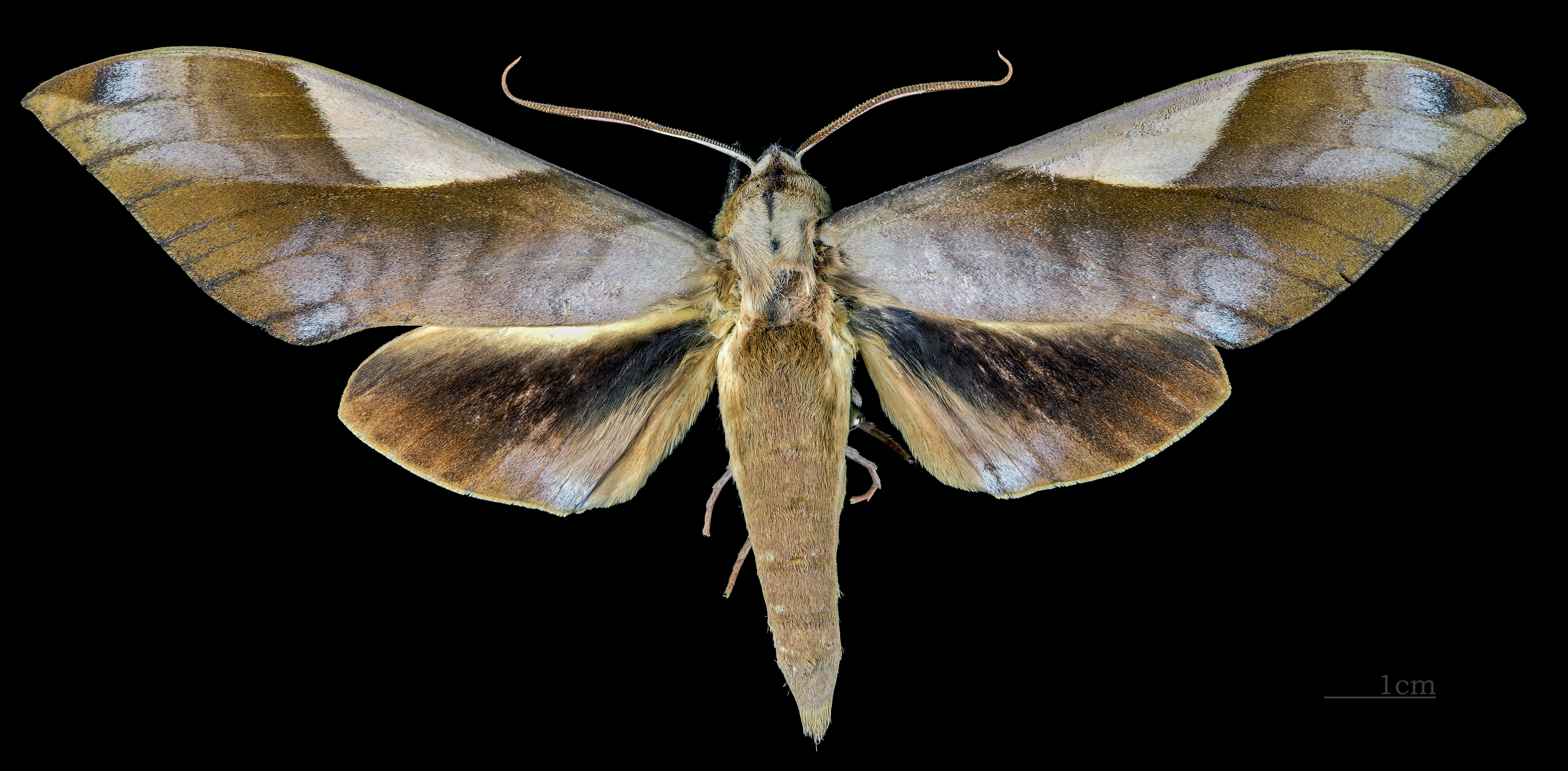
- Dorsal view
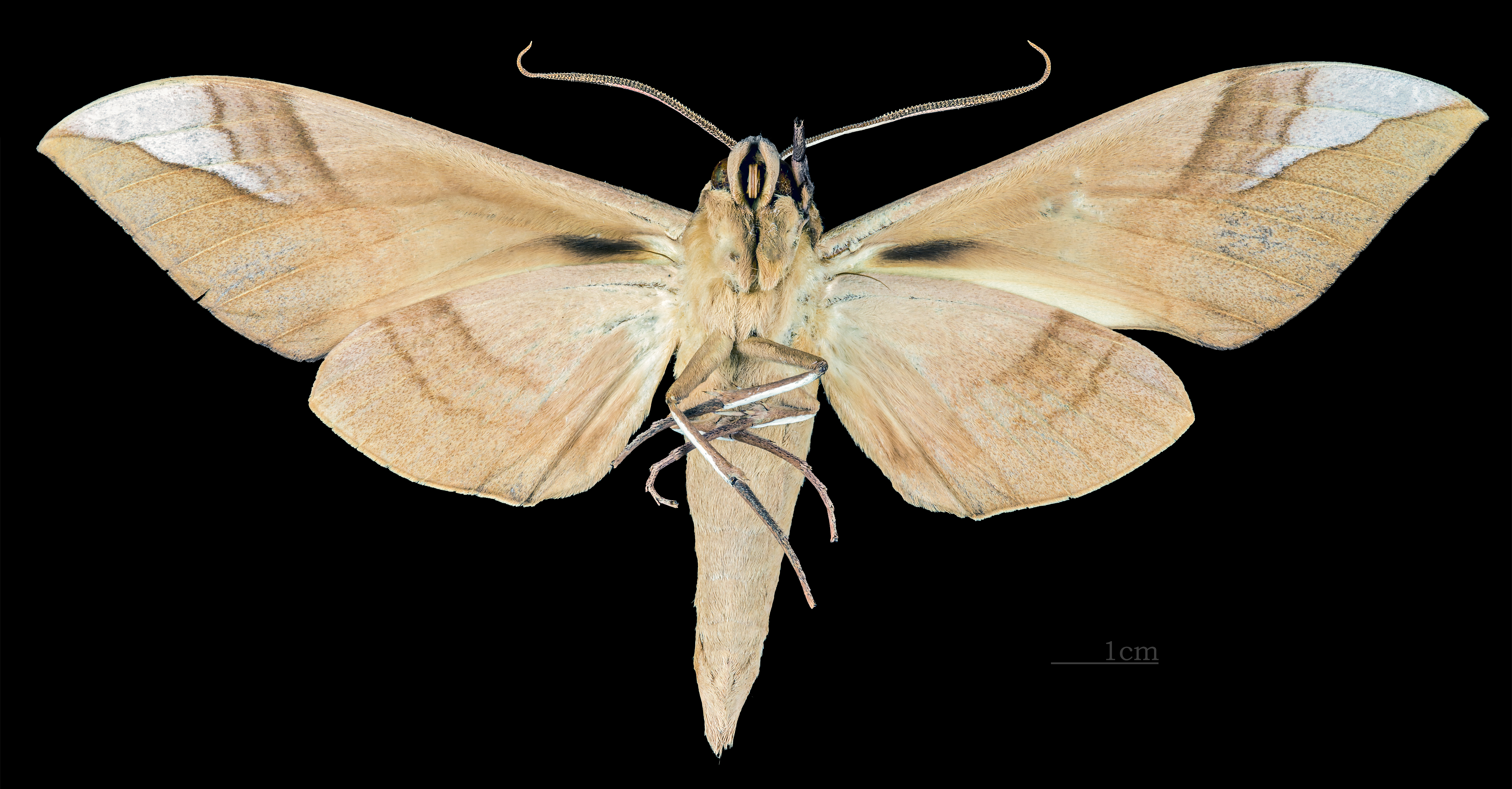
- Ventral view

Scientific classification
- Domain: Eukaryota
- Kingdom: Animalia
- Phylum: Arthropoda
- Class: Insecta
- Order: Lepidoptera
- Family: Sphingidae
- Genus: Clanis
- Species: C. pratti

Binomial name
- Clanis pratti Joicey & Talbot 1921

= Clanis pratti =

Species of moth

Clanis pratti is a species of moth of the family Sphingidae first described by James John Joicey and George Talbot in 1921. It is known from Sulawesi and surrounding islands in Indonesia.

== Subspecies ==
- Clanis pratti pratti
- Clanis pratti okurai Cadiou & Holloway, 1989
