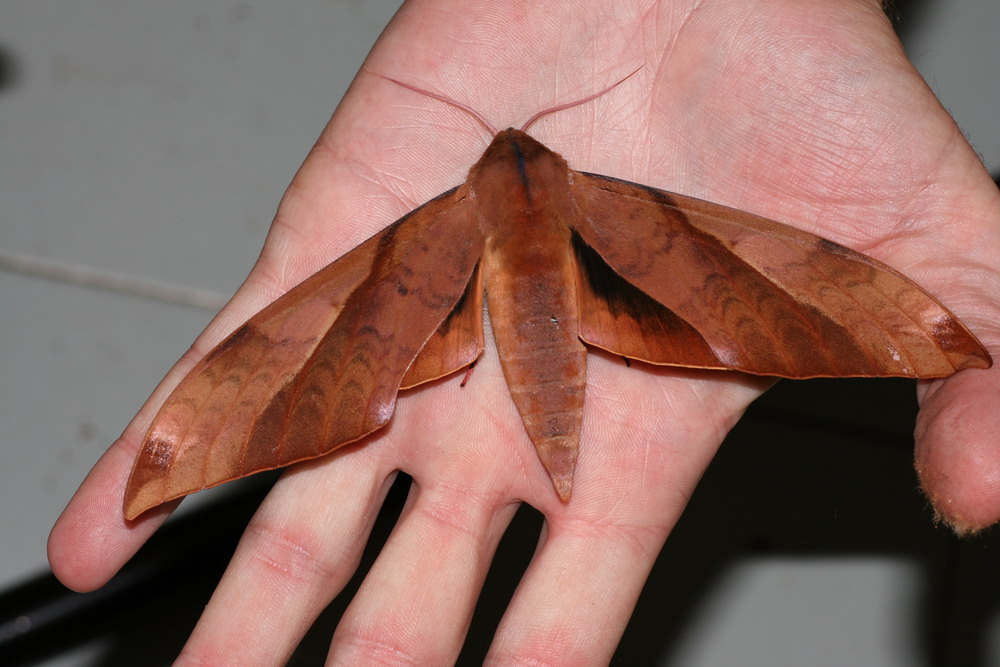
- Clanis undulosa gigantea

Scientific classification
- Domain: Eukaryota
- Kingdom: Animalia
- Phylum: Arthropoda
- Class: Insecta
- Order: Lepidoptera
- Family: Sphingidae
- Genus: Clanis
- Species: C. undulosa

Binomial name
- Clanis undulosa Moore, 1879

Synonyms
- Clanis gigantea Rothschild, 1894; Clanis undulosa jankowskii Gehlen, 1932; Clanis undulosa roseata Mell, 1922; Clanis undulosa acuta Mell, 1922; Clanis undulosa hoenei Mell, 1935; Clanis undulosa pallescens Mell, 1922

= Clanis undulosa =

Species of moth

Clanis undulosa, the wavy velvet hawkmoth, is a moth of the family Sphingidae first described by Frederic Moore in 1879. The nominate subspecies is found in the southern Russian Far East, the Korean Peninsula and north-eastern China, as far as south and west as Shaanxi and Hebei. South from Sichuan (Baoxing), Hubei, Jiangxi (Guling) and Zhejiang (Tianmu Shan), it is replaced by ssp. gigantea, which ranges west to Nepal and south, through Thailand and Vietnam, to Peninsular Malaysia.

== Description ==
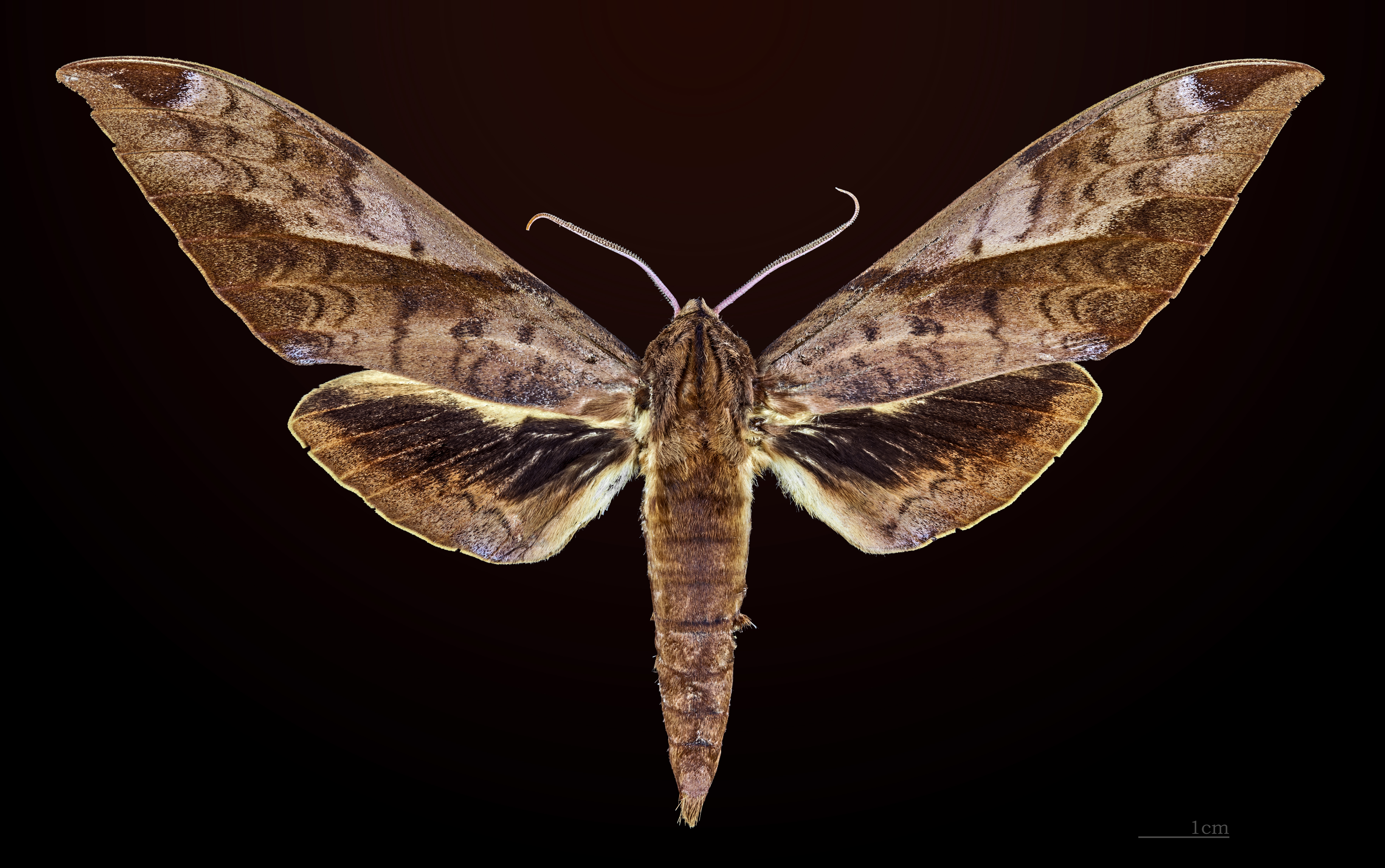
Male dorsal view

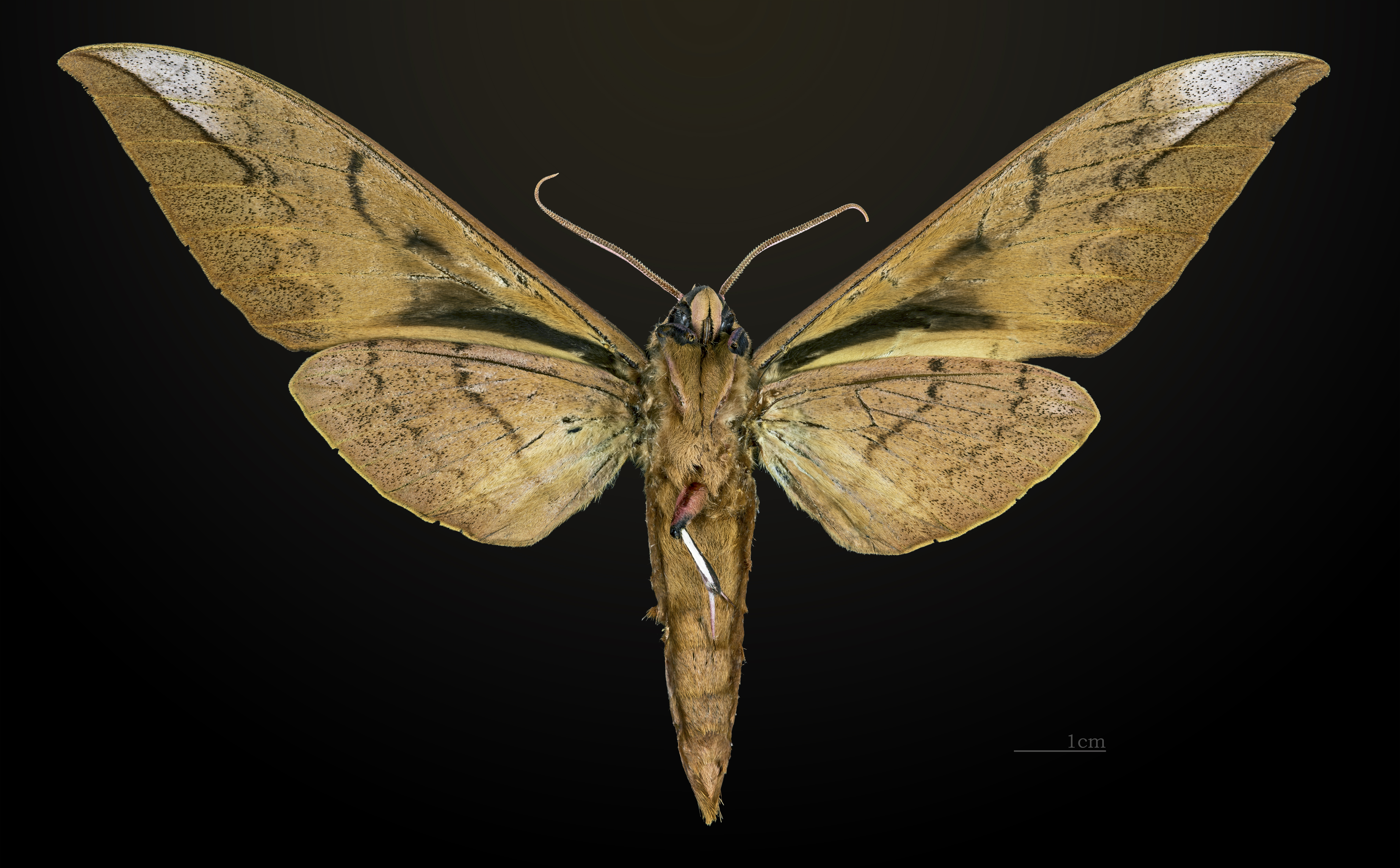
Male ventral view

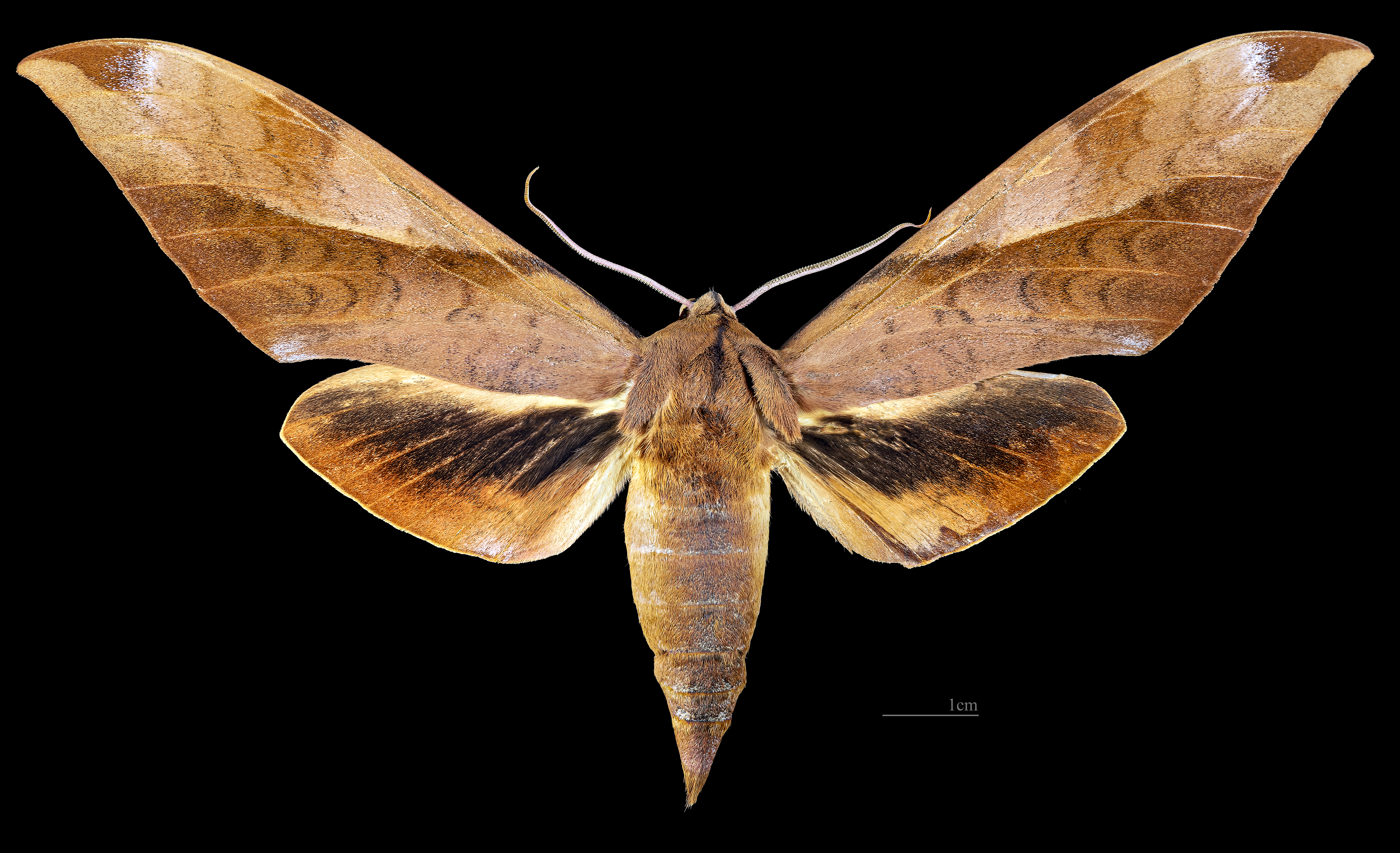
Female dorsal view

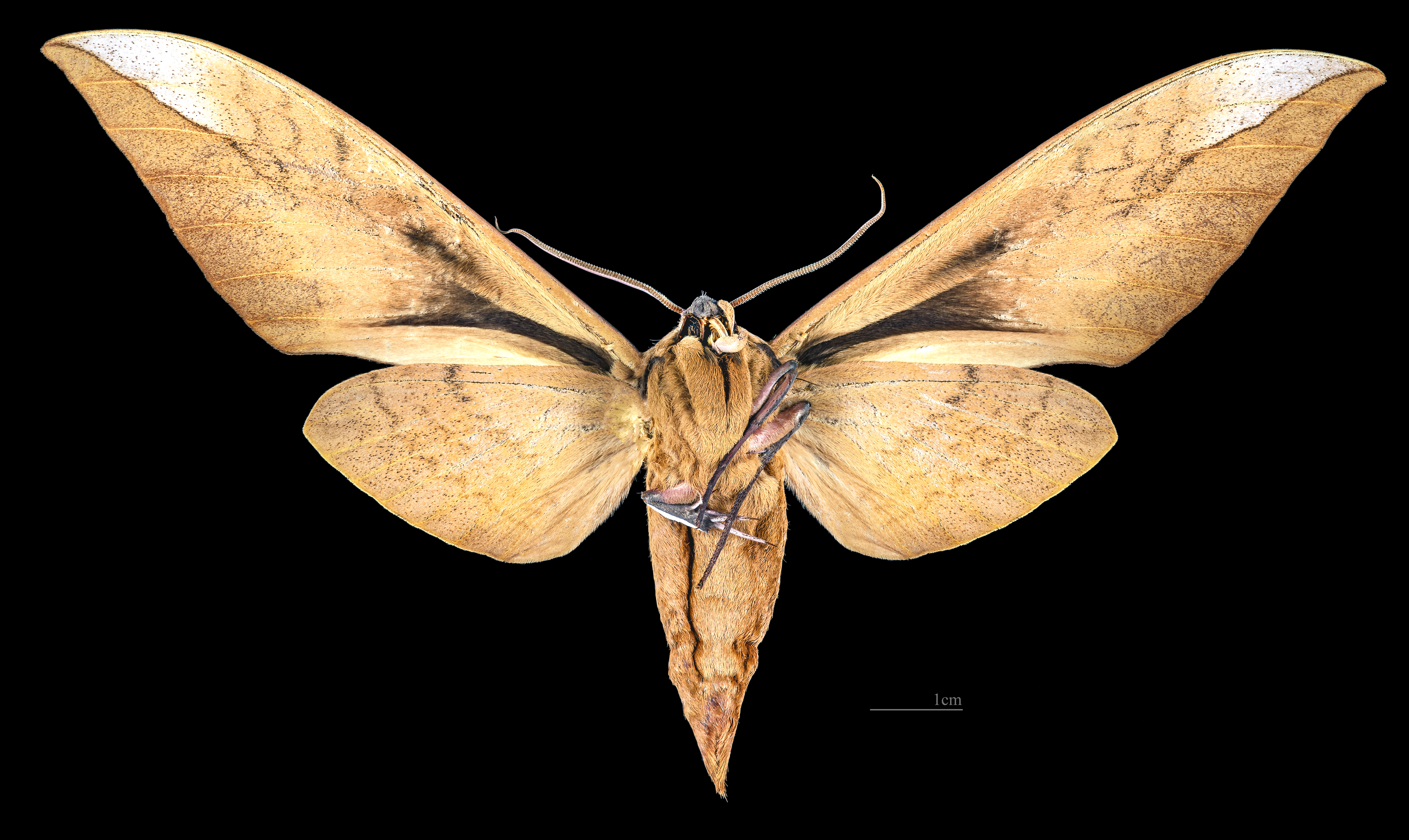
Female ventral view

The wingspan is 100–120 mm for subspecies C. u. undulosa and 118–160 mm for subspecies C. u. gigantea. Adults of the nominate subspecies are on wing from June to early August in Korea.

== Biology ==
The food plants of the nominate subspecies are unknown. The larvae of subspecies C. u. gigantea have been recorded on Lespedeza viatorum in Guangdong and on Lespedeza thompsoni in north-eastern India.

== Subspecies ==
- Clanis undulosa undulosa (southern Russian Far East, the Korean Peninsula and northeastern China, as far south and west as Shaanxi and Hebei)
- Clanis undulosa gigantea Rothschild, 1894 (South from Sichuan, Hubei, Jiangxi and Zhejiang west to Nepal and north-eastern India and south, through Thailand and Vietnam, to Peninsular Malaysia)
