= Clanis mahadeva =

Scientific classification
- Domain: Eukaryota
- Kingdom: Animalia
- Phylum: Arthropoda
- Class: Insecta
- Order: Lepidoptera
- Family: Sphingidae
- Genus: Clanis
- Species: C. mahadeva

Binomial name
- Clanis mahadeva Gehlen, 1935

Species of moth

Clanis mahadeva is a species of moth of the family Sphingidae. It is known from India.
