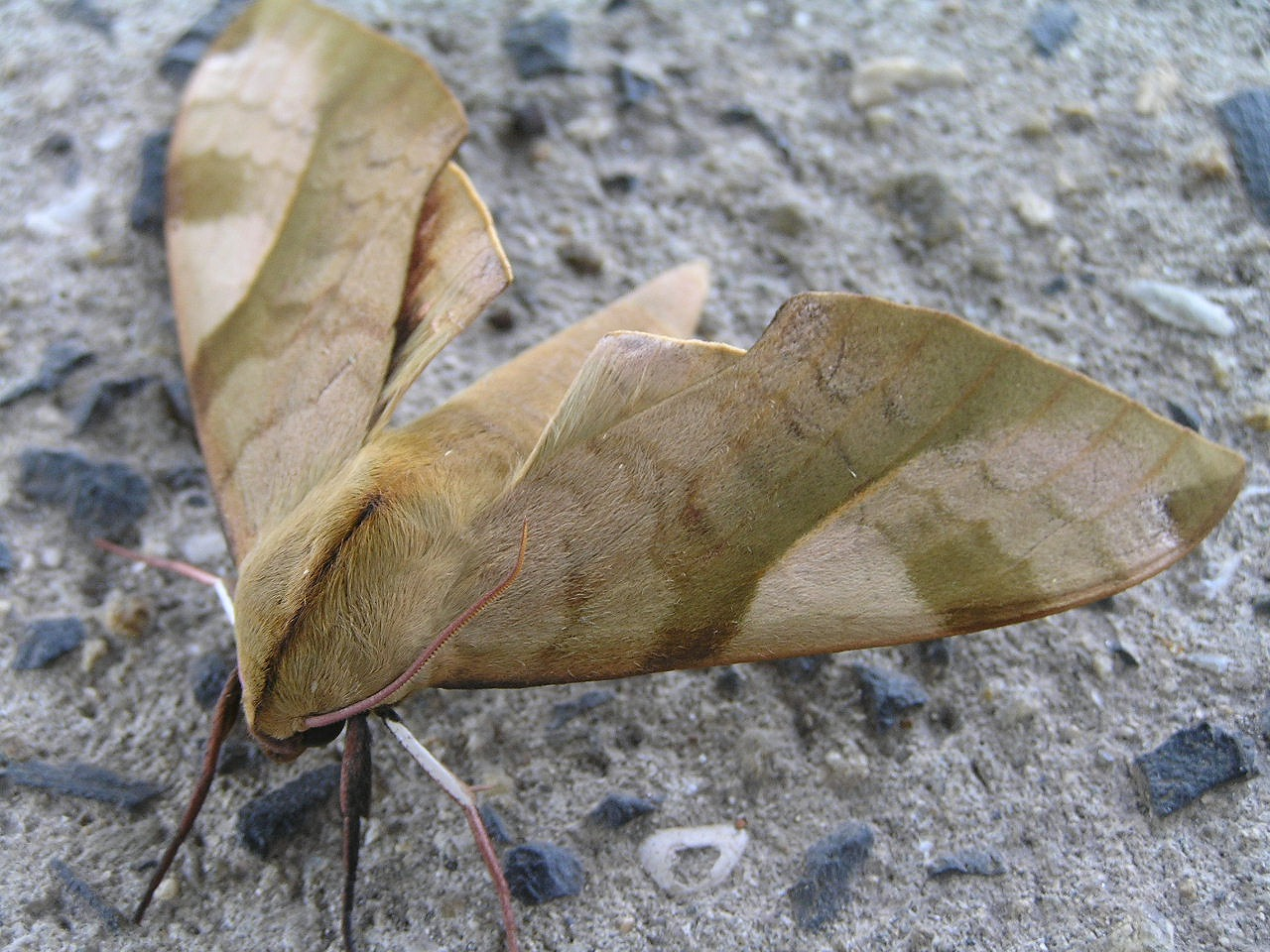
- Clanis bilineata

Scientific classification
- Domain: Eukaryota
- Kingdom: Animalia
- Phylum: Arthropoda
- Class: Insecta
- Order: Lepidoptera
- Family: Sphingidae
- Tribe: Smerinthini
- Genus: Clanis; Hübner, 1819

Synonyms
- Basiana Walker, 1856; Metagastes Boisduval, 1875

= Clanis =

Genus of moths

Clanis is a genus of moths in the family Sphingidae erected by Jacob Hübner in 1819.

== Species ==
- Clanis baratana Brechlin, 1998
- Clanis bilineata (Walker 1866)
- Clanis deucalion (Walker 1856)
- Clanis euroa Rothschild & Jordan 1903
- Clanis hyperion Cadiou & Kitching 1990
- Clanis mahadeva Gehlen, 1935
- Clanis mcguirei Eitschberger, 2004
- Clanis negritensis Hoegenes & Treadaway 1993
- Clanis orhanti Haxaire, 2001
- Clanis peterseni Eitschberger, 2004
- Clanis phalaris (Cramer 1777)
- Clanis pratti Joicey & Talbot 1921
- Clanis schwartzi Cadio 1993
- Clanis stenosema Rothschild & Jordan 1907
- Clanis surigaoensis Clark 1928
- Clanis thailandica Eitschberger, 2004
- Clanis titan Rothschild & Jordan 1903
- Clanis undulosa Moore 1879

== Gallery ==
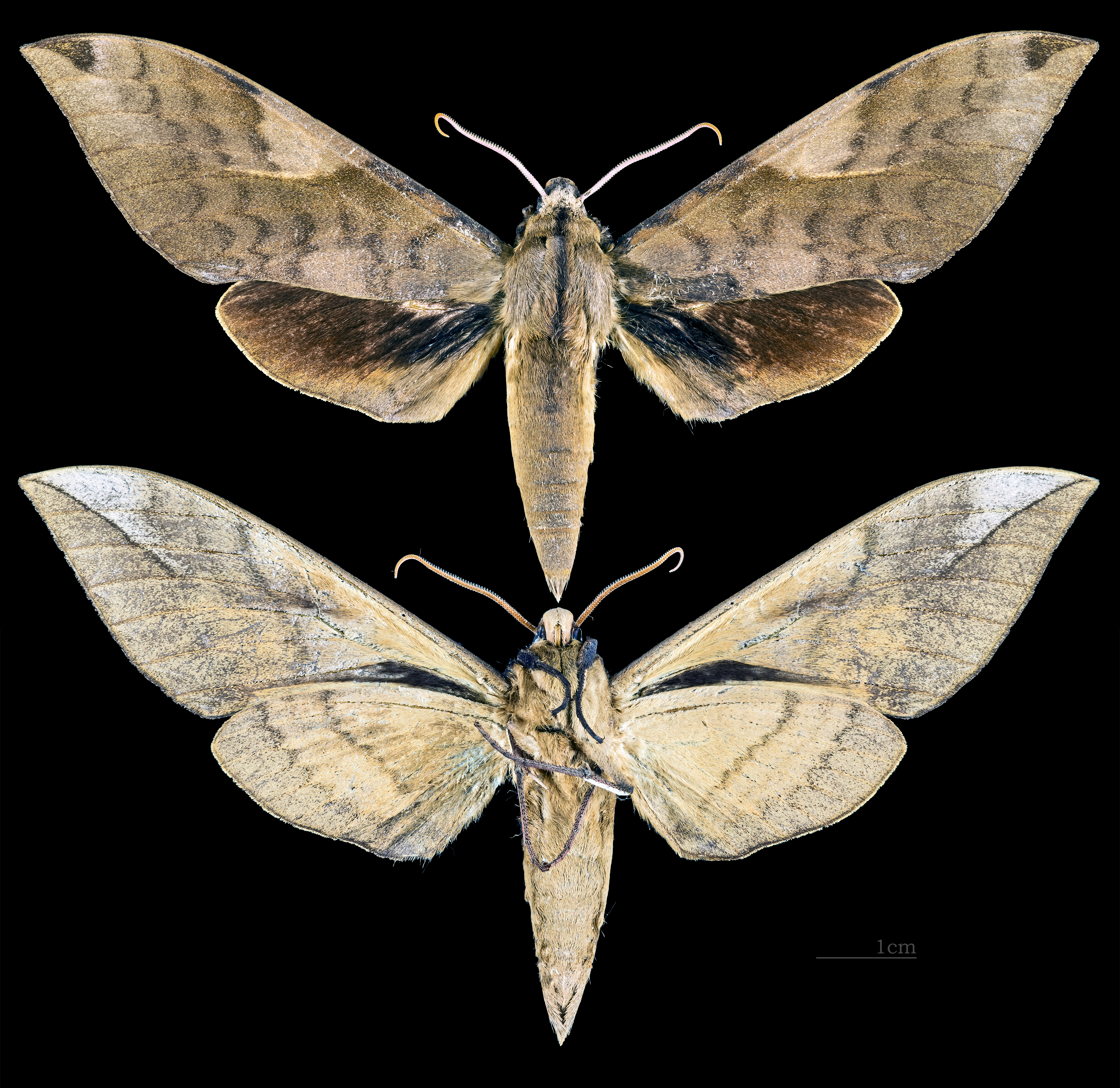
Clanis bilineata

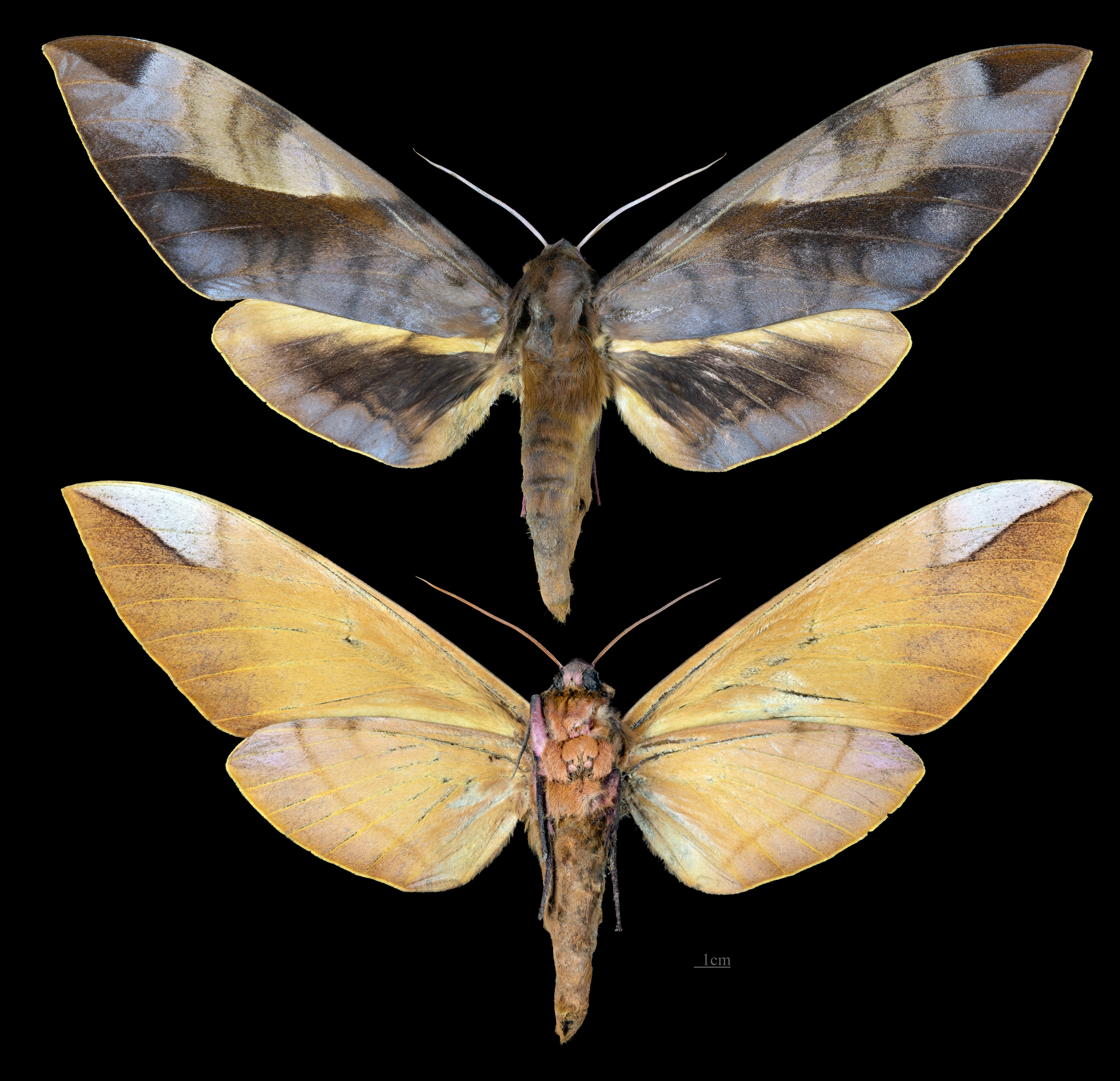
Clanis hyperion

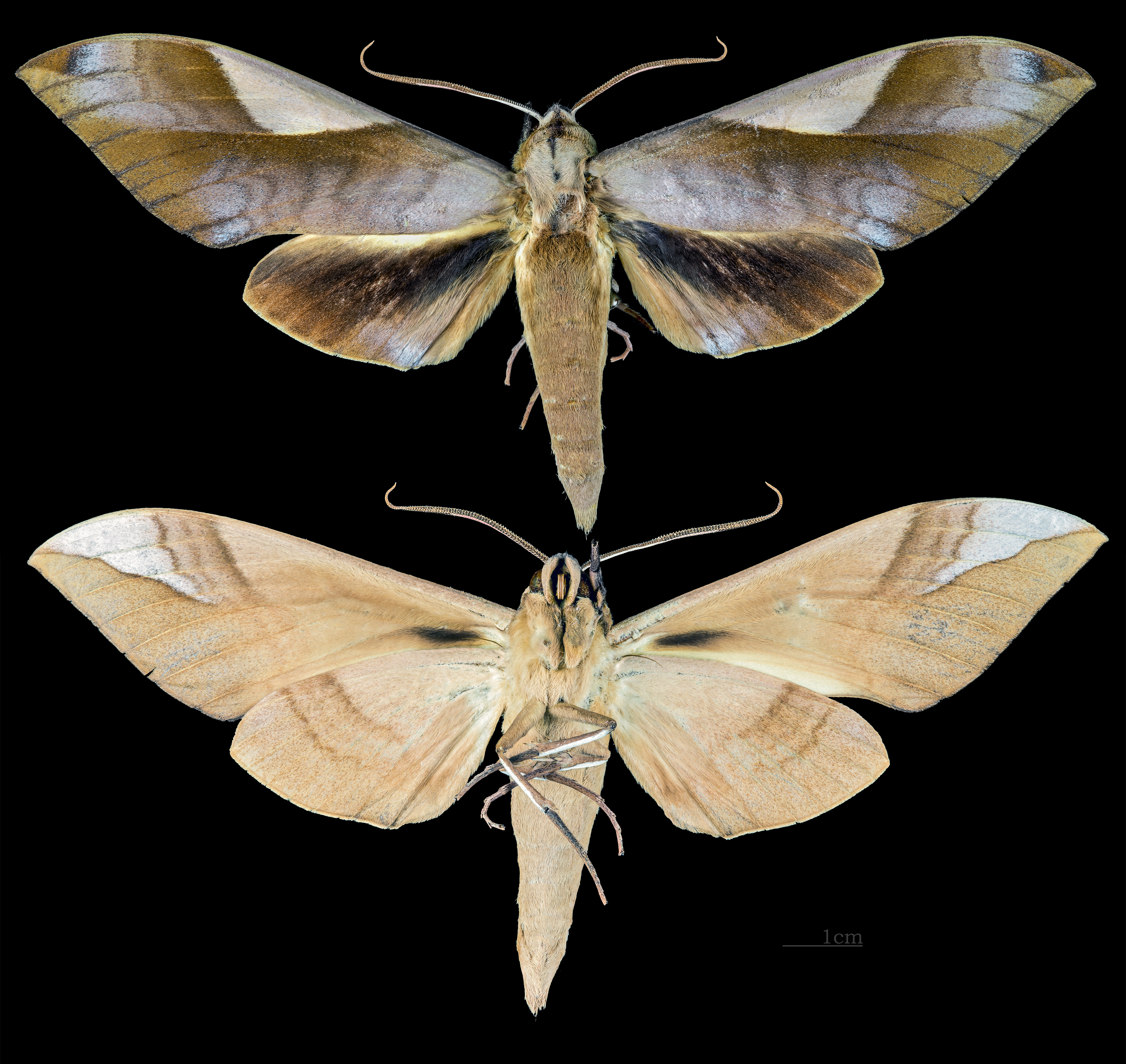
Clanis pratti

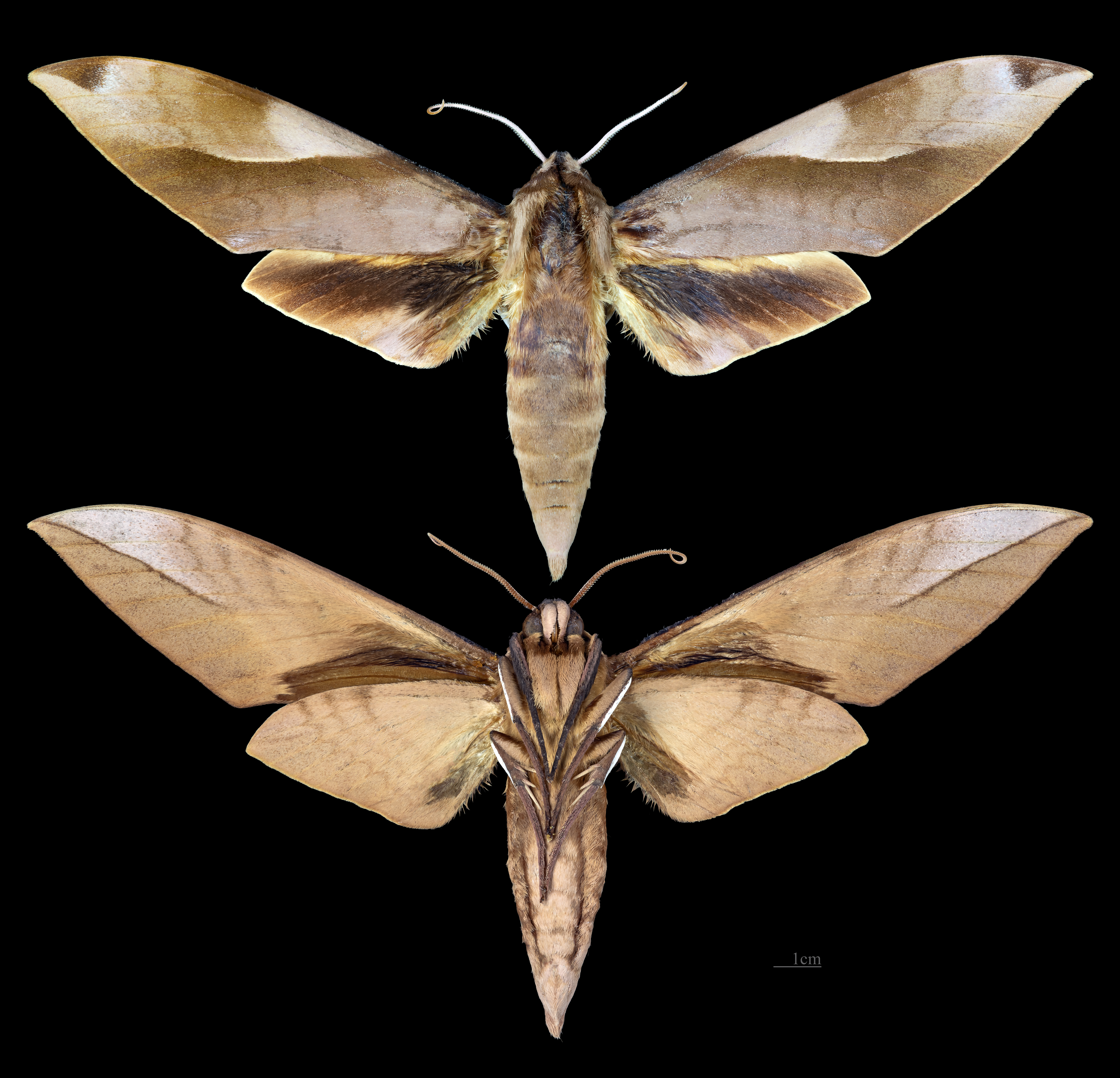
Clanis schwartzi

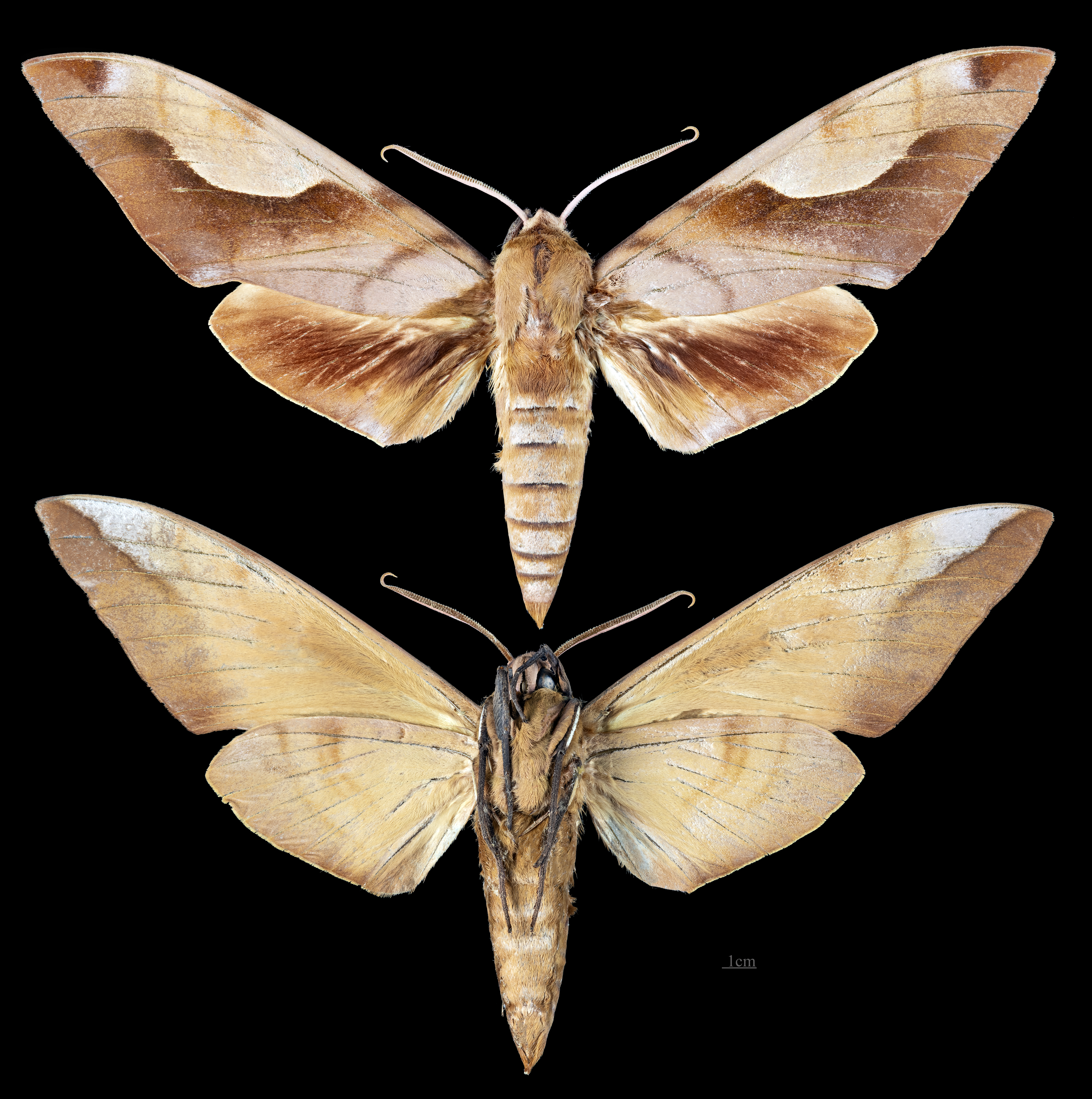
Clanis titan

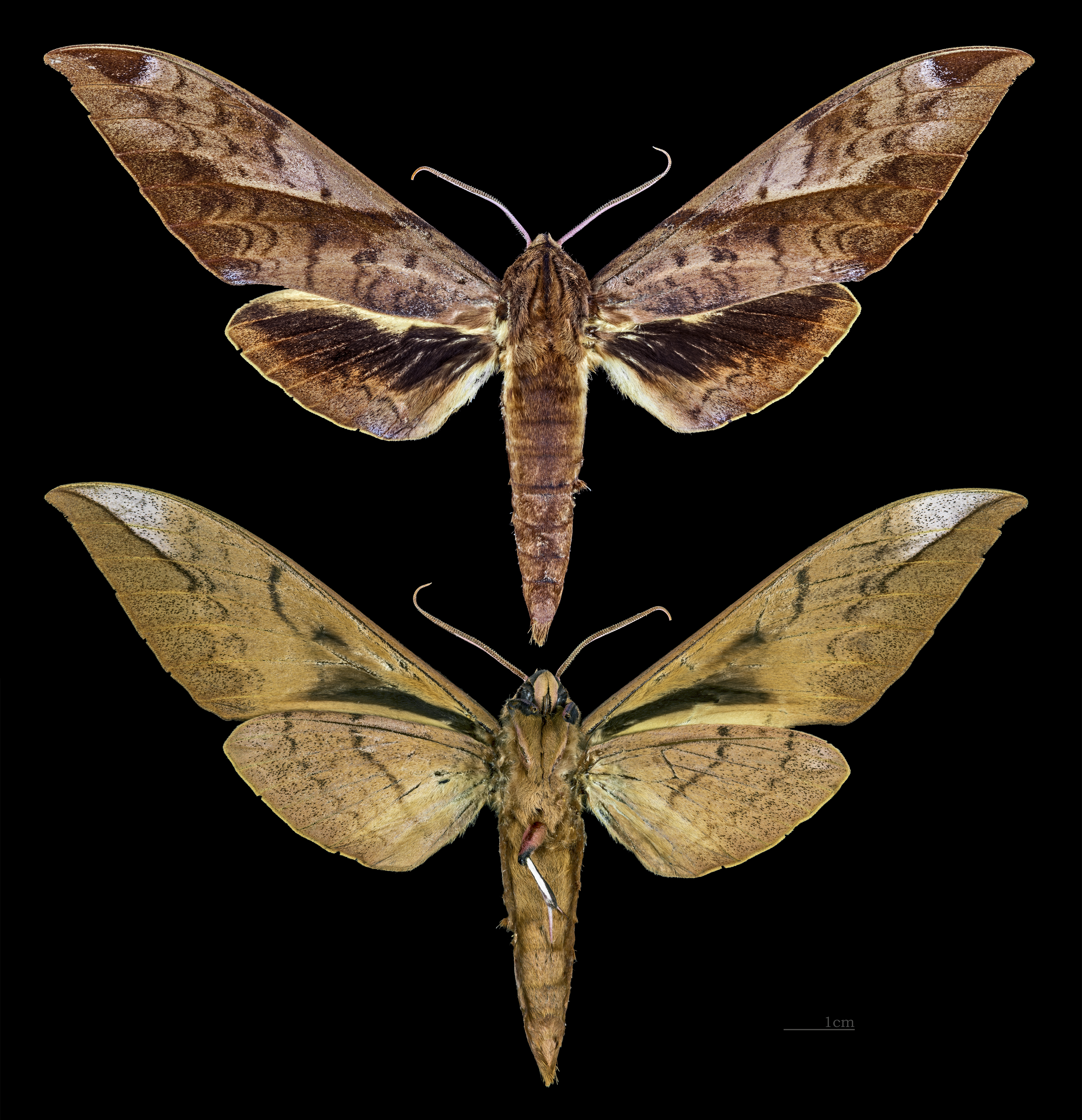
Clanis undulosa
