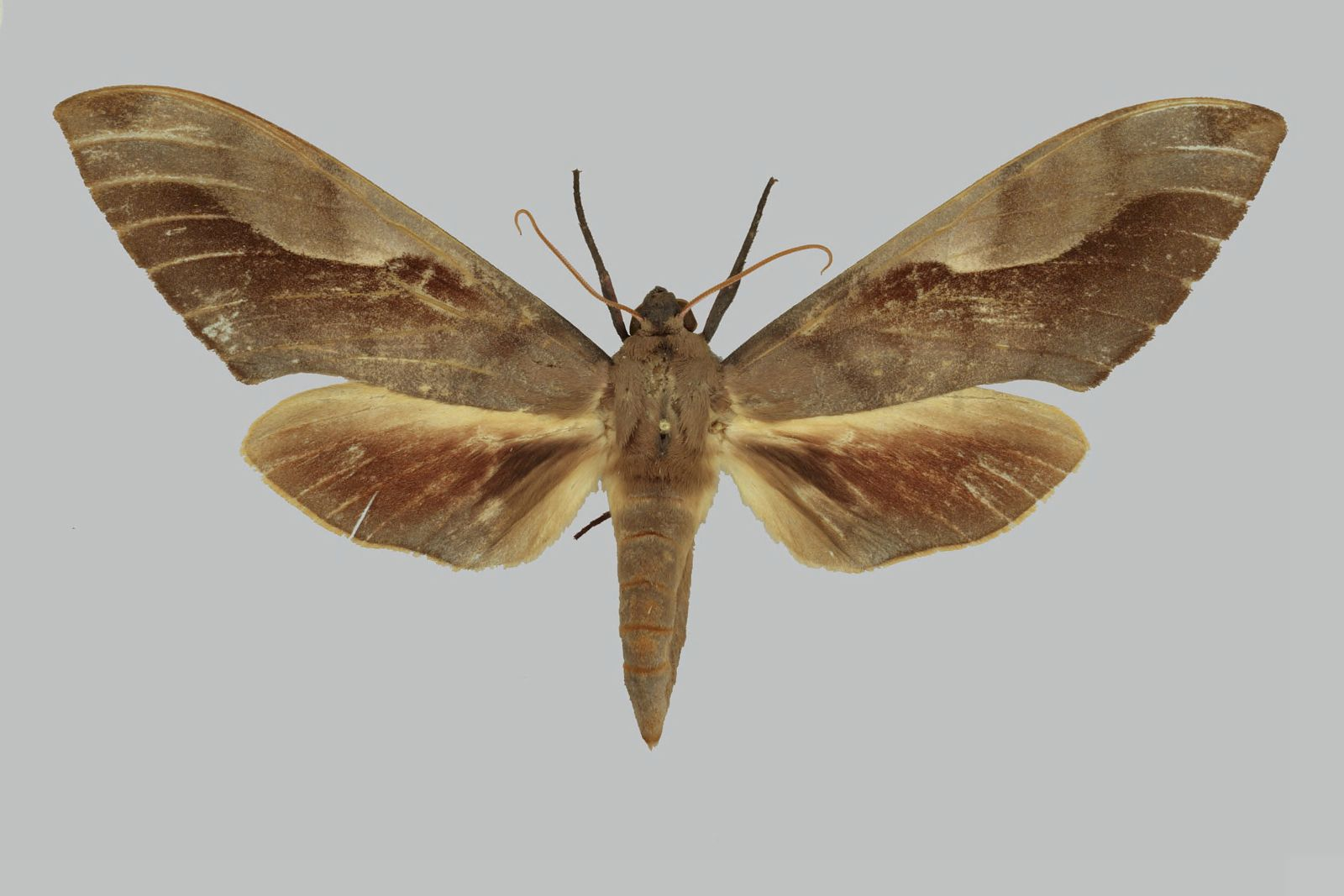

Scientific classification
- Kingdom: Animalia
- Phylum: Arthropoda
- Class: Insecta
- Order: Lepidoptera
- Family: Sphingidae
- Genus: Clanis
- Species: C. euroa

Binomial name
- Clanis euroa Rothschild & Jordan, 1903

= Clanis euroa =

Species of moth

Clanis euroa is a species of moth of the family Sphingidae. It is found in Timor-Leste and eastern Indonesia in the provinces of Bali, West Nusa Tenggara, East Nusa Tenggara, and Maluku.
