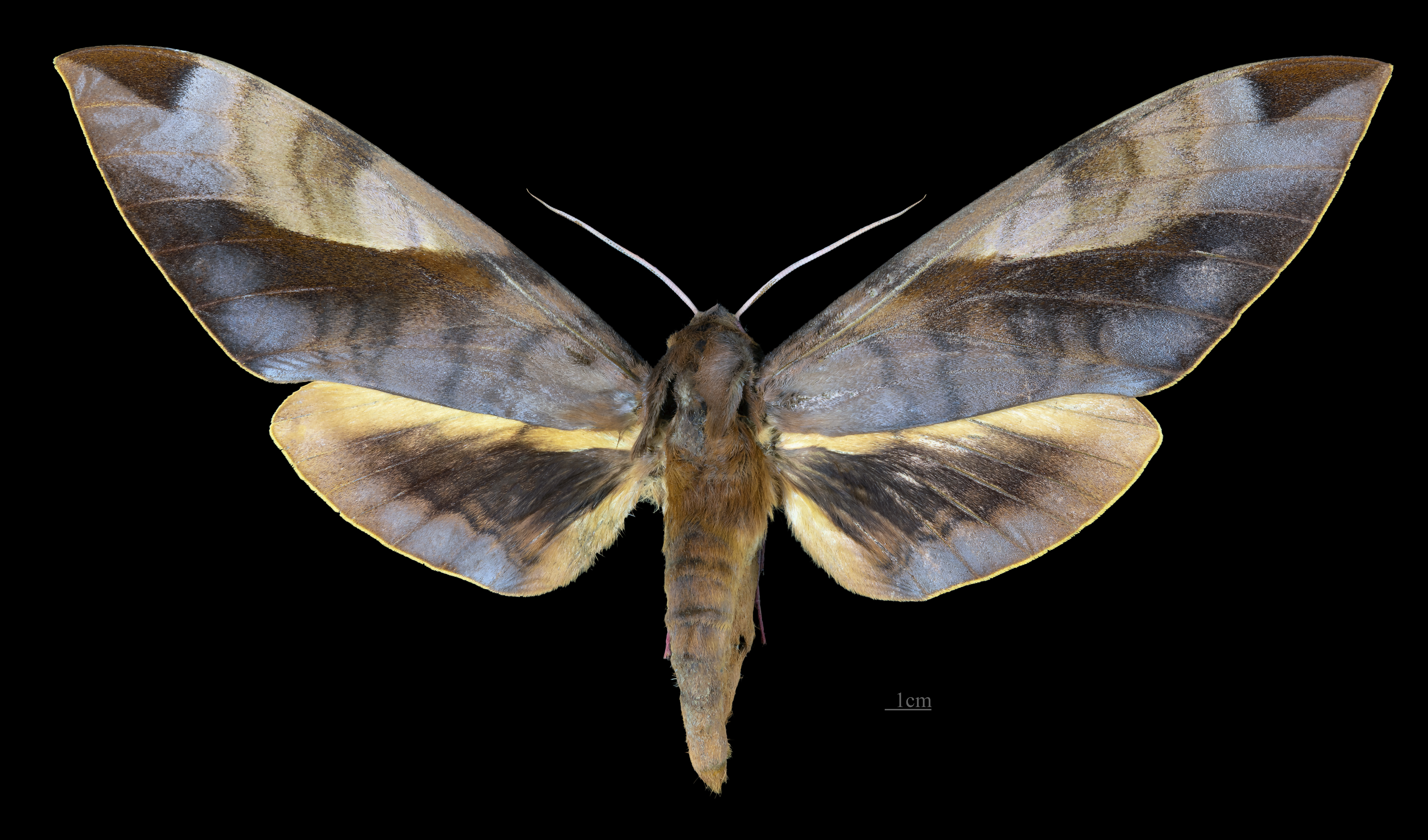
- female dorsal
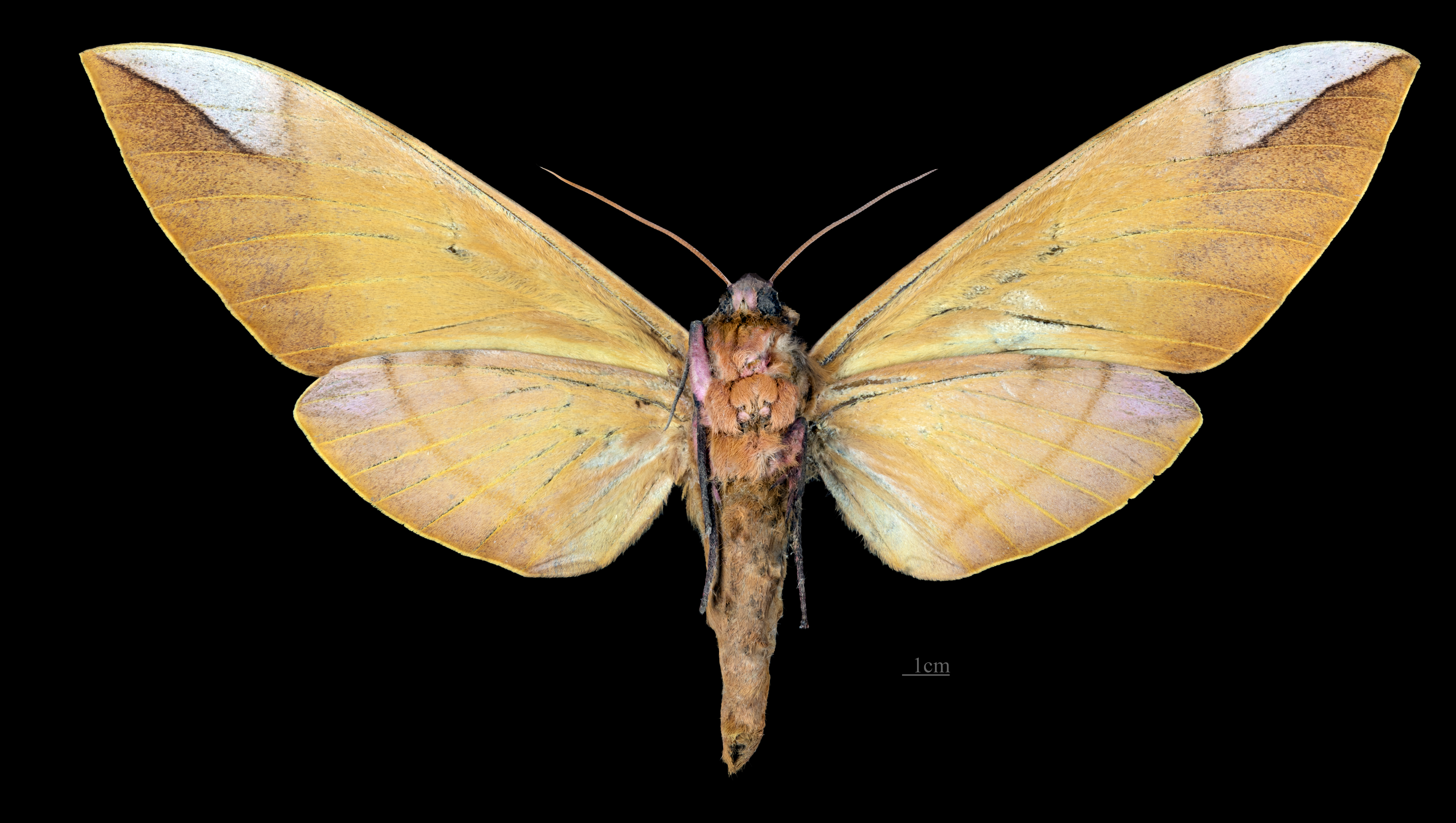
- female ventral

Scientific classification
- Kingdom: Animalia
- Phylum: Arthropoda
- Clade: Pancrustacea
- Class: Insecta
- Order: Lepidoptera
- Family: Sphingidae
- Genus: Clanis
- Species: C. hyperion

Binomial name
- Clanis hyperion Cadiou & Kitching, 1990

= Clanis hyperion =

Species of moth

Clanis hyperion is a species of moth of the family Sphingidae. It is found from Yunnan in southern China to northern Thailand and north-eastern India.

Adults are on wing from March to October in Thailand.
