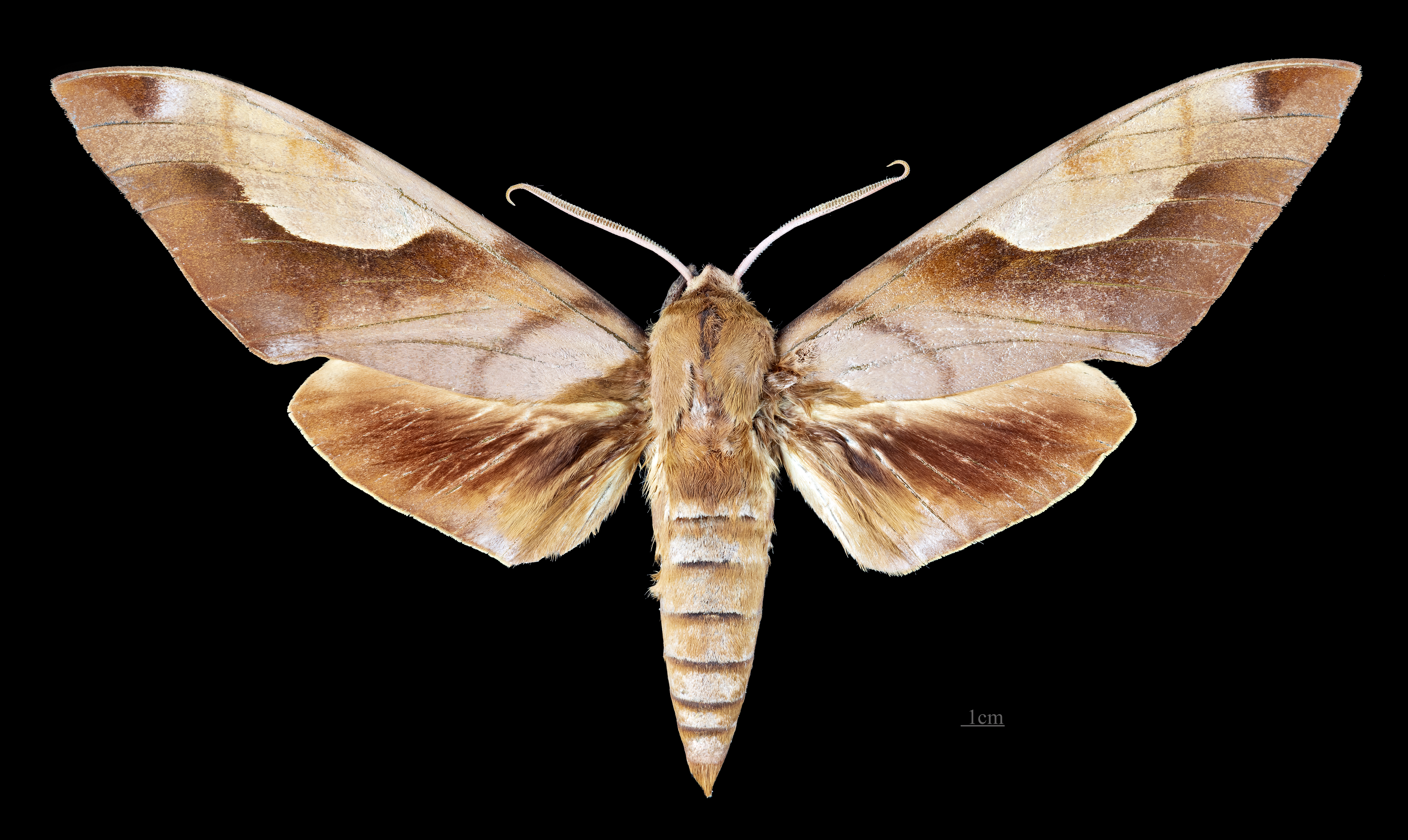
- Male dorsal
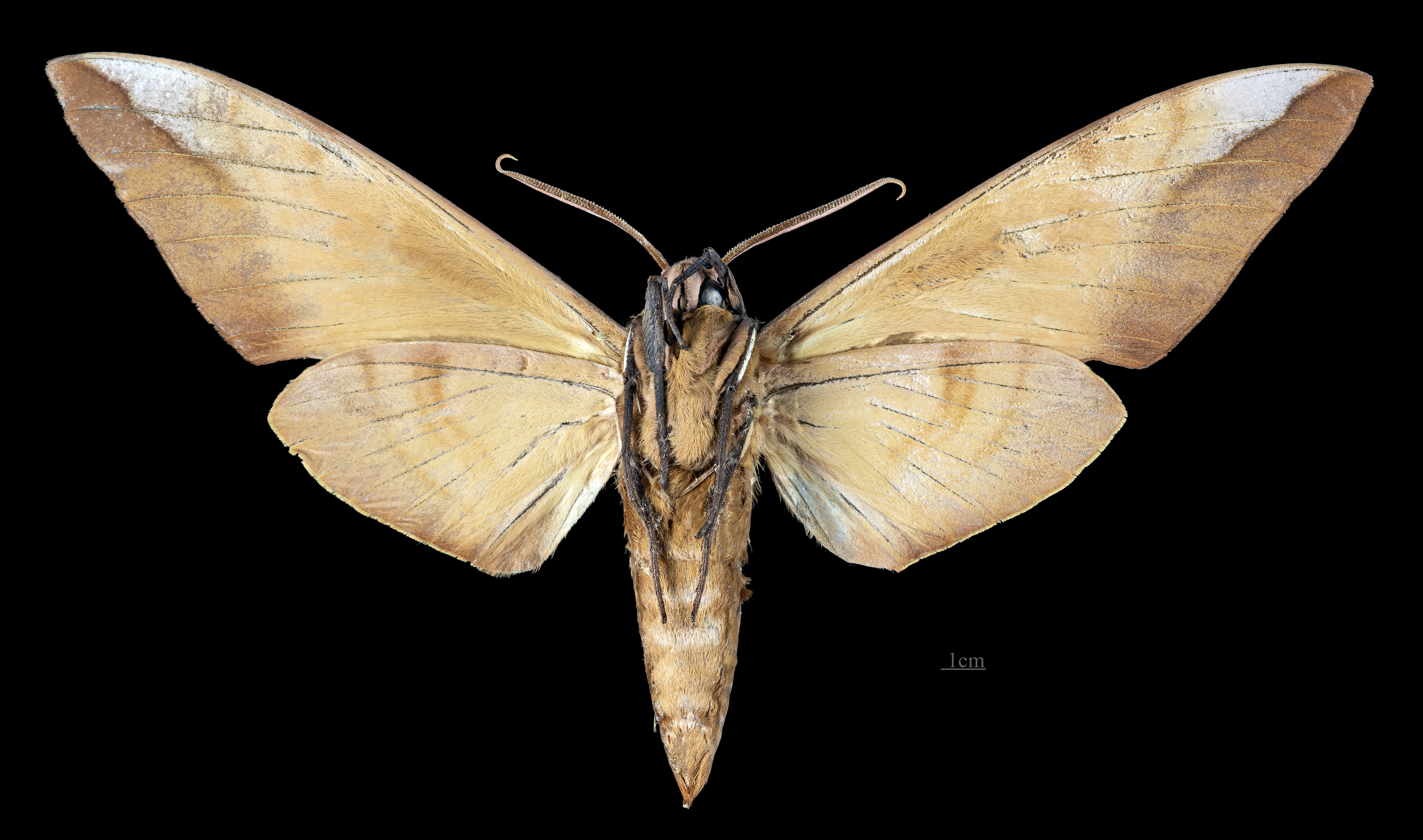
- Male ventral

Scientific classification
- Domain: Eukaryota
- Kingdom: Animalia
- Phylum: Arthropoda
- Class: Insecta
- Order: Lepidoptera
- Family: Sphingidae
- Genus: Clanis
- Species: C. titan

Binomial name
- Clanis titan Rothschild & Jordan, 1903

= Clanis titan =

Species of moth

Clanis titan, the scarce velvet hawkmoth, is a species of moth of the family Sphingidae.

== Distribution ==
It is found from India and Nepal east and south through Myanmar and Yunnan in south-western China to Thailand, Vietnam and Peninsular Malaysia.

== Description ==
The wingspan is 128–148 mm.

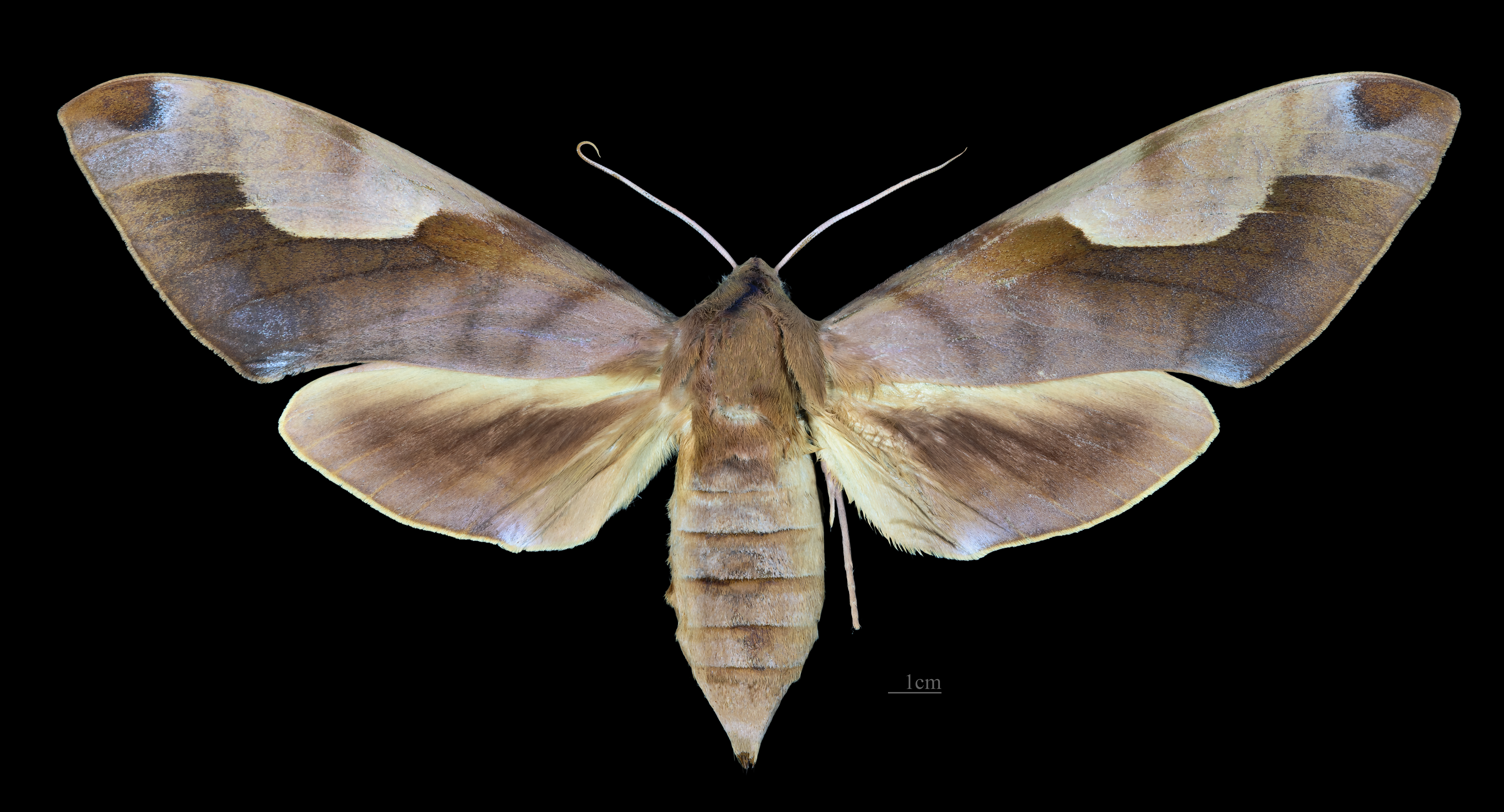
Female dorsal

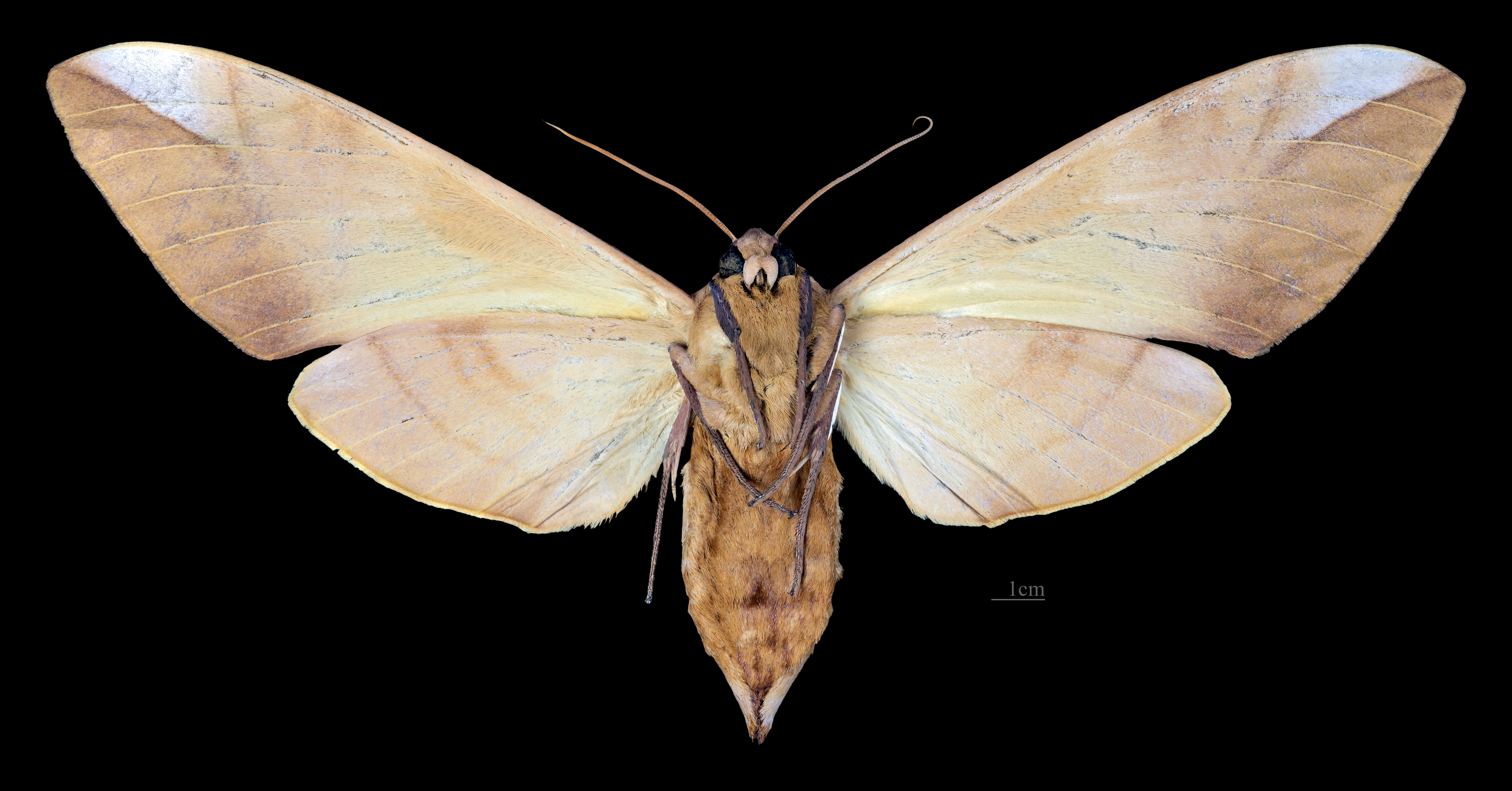
Female ventral

== Biology ==
The larvae have been recorded feeding on Pterocarpus marsupium in India and Dalbergia olivieri in Laos and Thailand.
