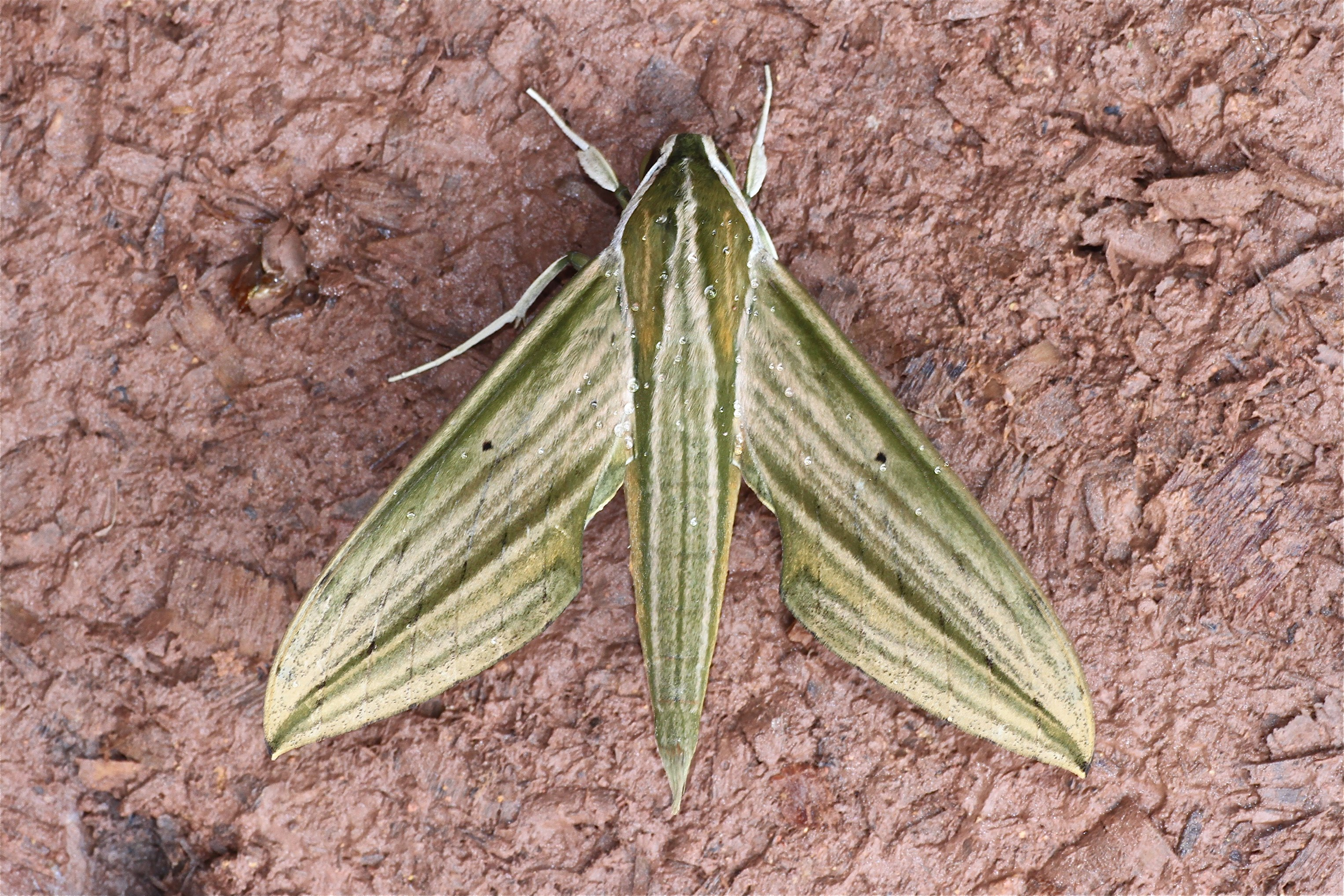

Scientific classification
- Kingdom: Animalia
- Phylum: Arthropoda
- Class: Insecta
- Order: Lepidoptera
- Family: Sphingidae
- Genus: Cechenena
- Species: C. lineosa

Binomial name
- Cechenena lineosa (Walker, 1856)

Synonyms
- Chaerocampa lineosa Walker, 1856; Chaerocampa major Butler, 1875; Cechenena lineosa viridula Bryk, 1944

= Cechenena lineosa =

Species of moth

Cechenena lineosa, the striped green hawkmoth, is a moth of the family Sphingidae. It is known from northern India, Nepal, Bangladesh, Myanmar, Thailand, southern China, Taiwan, Vietnam, Malaysia (Peninsular, Sarawak, Sabah) and Indonesia (Sumatra, Java, Kalimantan).

== Description ==
The wingspan is 74–120 mm. It is a variable species, with regard to both forewing upperside ground colour and pattern intensity. There are seven oblique postmedian lines on the forewing upperside. There is considerable variation in the brightness of the spaces between the bands. Both the forewing and hindwing underside ground colour is orange-beige. There is a pale buff median band of variable width located on the hindwing upperside.

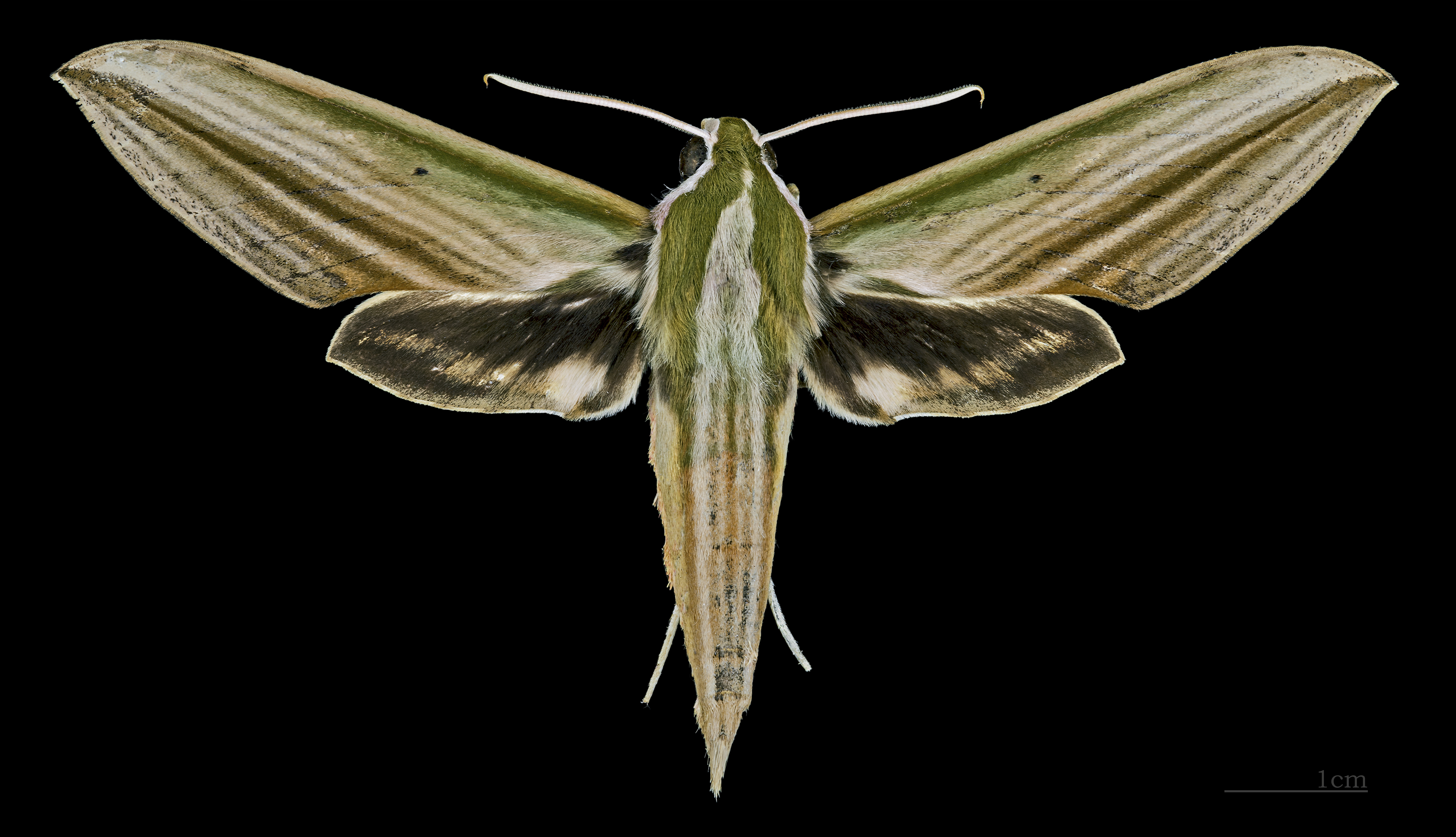
Female Cechenena lineosa

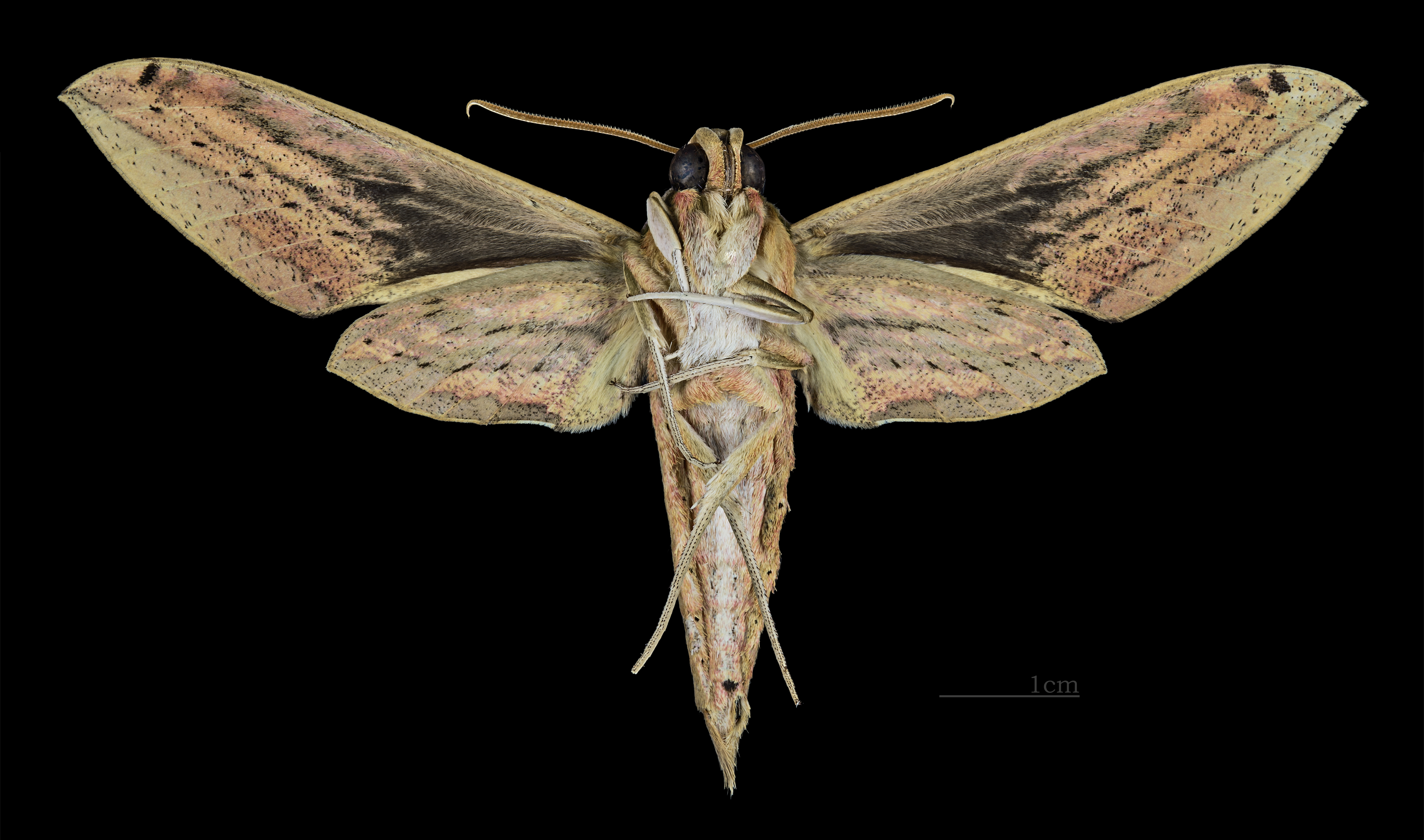
Female Cechenena lineosa underside

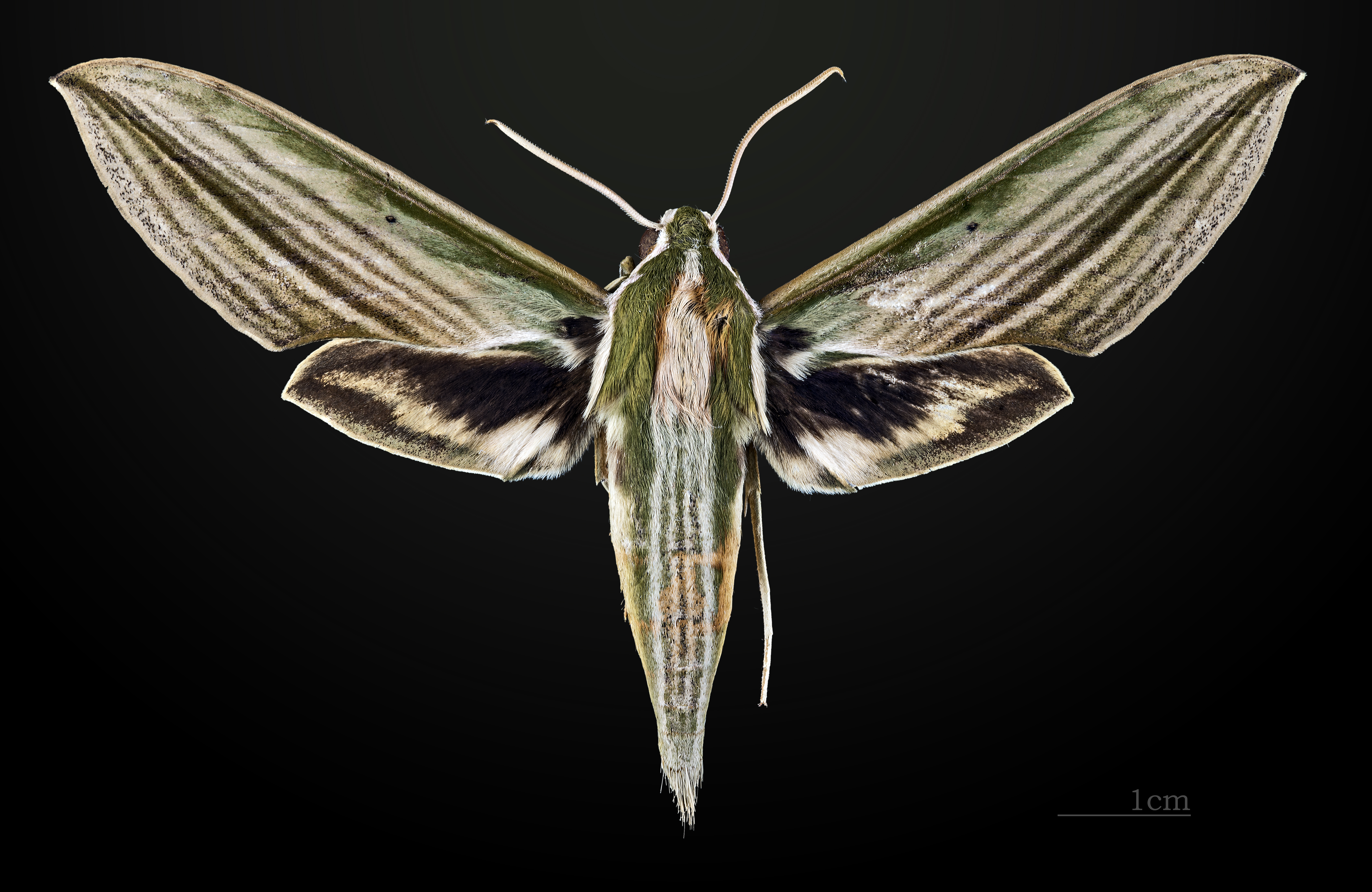
Male Cechenena lineosa

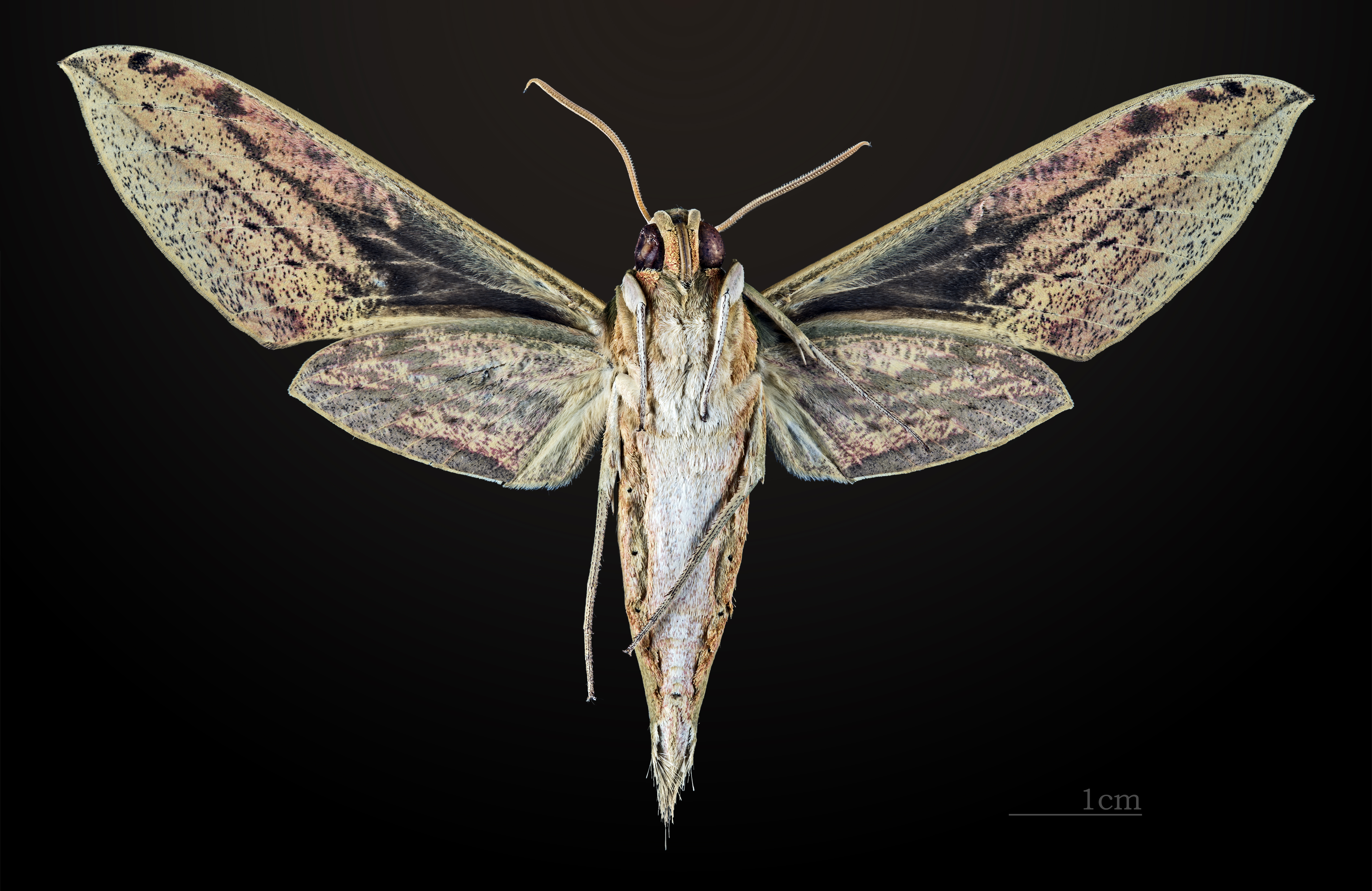
Male Cechenena lineosa, underside

== Biology ==
Adults are swift flyers and visit flowers after dusk.

The larvae have been recorded feeding on Saurauia tristyla, Impatiens, Vitis and Polygonum species in India.
