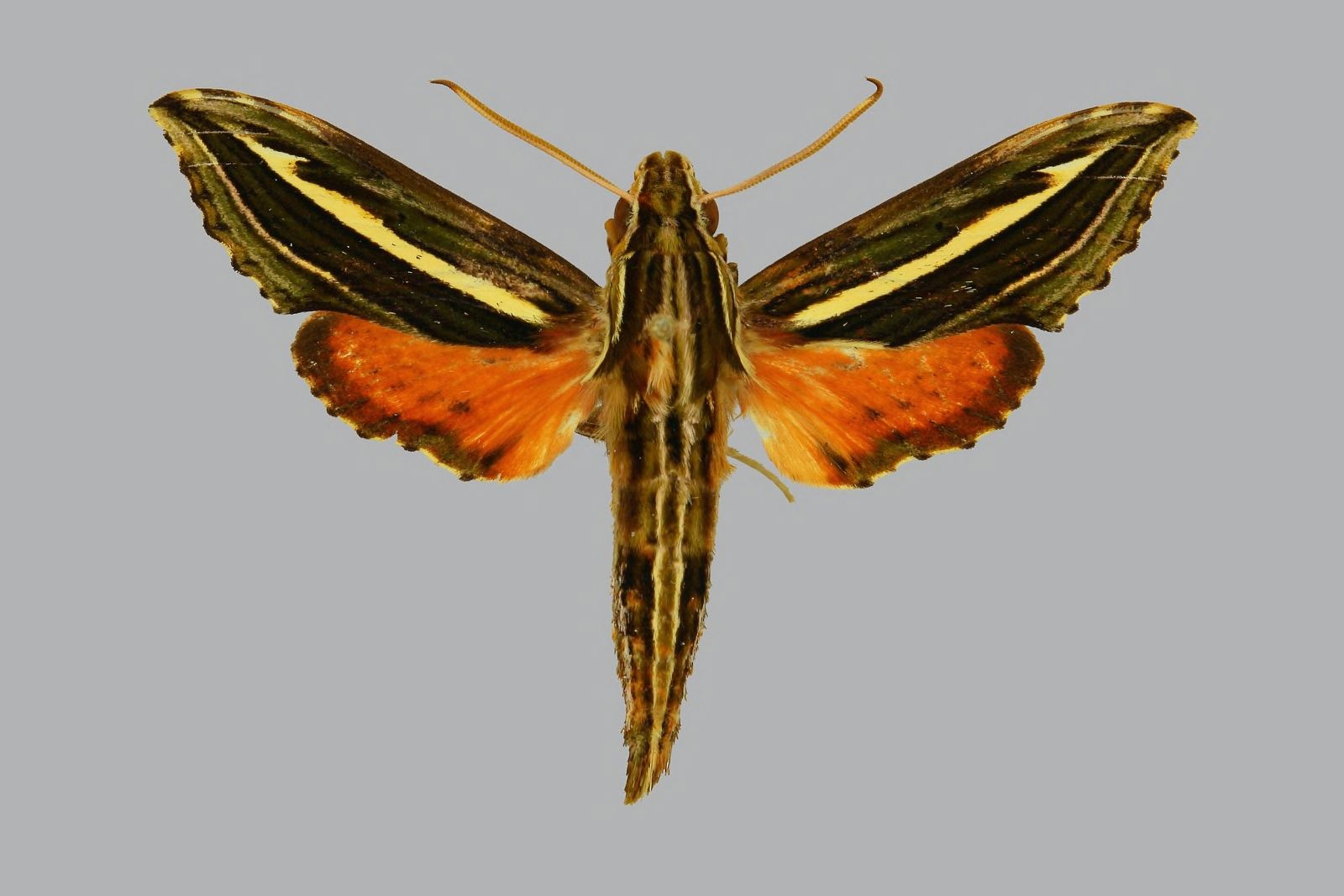

Scientific classification
- Kingdom: Animalia
- Phylum: Arthropoda
- Class: Insecta
- Order: Lepidoptera
- Family: Sphingidae
- Genus: Eupanacra
- Species: E. micholitzi

Binomial name
- Eupanacra micholitzi (Rothschild & Jordan, 1893)

Synonyms
- Panacra micholitzi Rothschild & Jordan, 1893; Panacra hollandiae Clark, 1931

= Eupanacra micholitzi =

Species of moth

Eupanacra micholitzi is a moth of the family Sphingidae. It is known from Papua New Guinea.

It is similar to Eupanacra pulchella, except for some differences on the lines on the forewing upperside. The hindwing underside inner margin is pale orange. The underside of the thorax and abdomen is white and the abdomen has a broad, brown median line.
