= Theretra lomblenica =

Scientific classification
- Kingdom: Animalia
- Phylum: Arthropoda
- Class: Insecta
- Order: Lepidoptera
- Family: Sphingidae
- Genus: Theretra
- Species: T. lomblenica

Binomial name
- Theretra lomblenica Eitschberger, 2010

Species of moth

Theretra lomblenica is a moth of the family Sphingidae. It is known from Lomblen Island in Indonesia.
