= Theretra balienensis =

Scientific classification
- Kingdom: Animalia
- Phylum: Arthropoda
- Class: Insecta
- Order: Lepidoptera
- Family: Sphingidae
- Genus: Theretra
- Species: T. balienensis

Binomial name
- Theretra balienensis Eitschberger, 2010

Species of moth

Theretra balienensis is a moth of the family Sphingidae. It is known from Bali in Indonesia.
