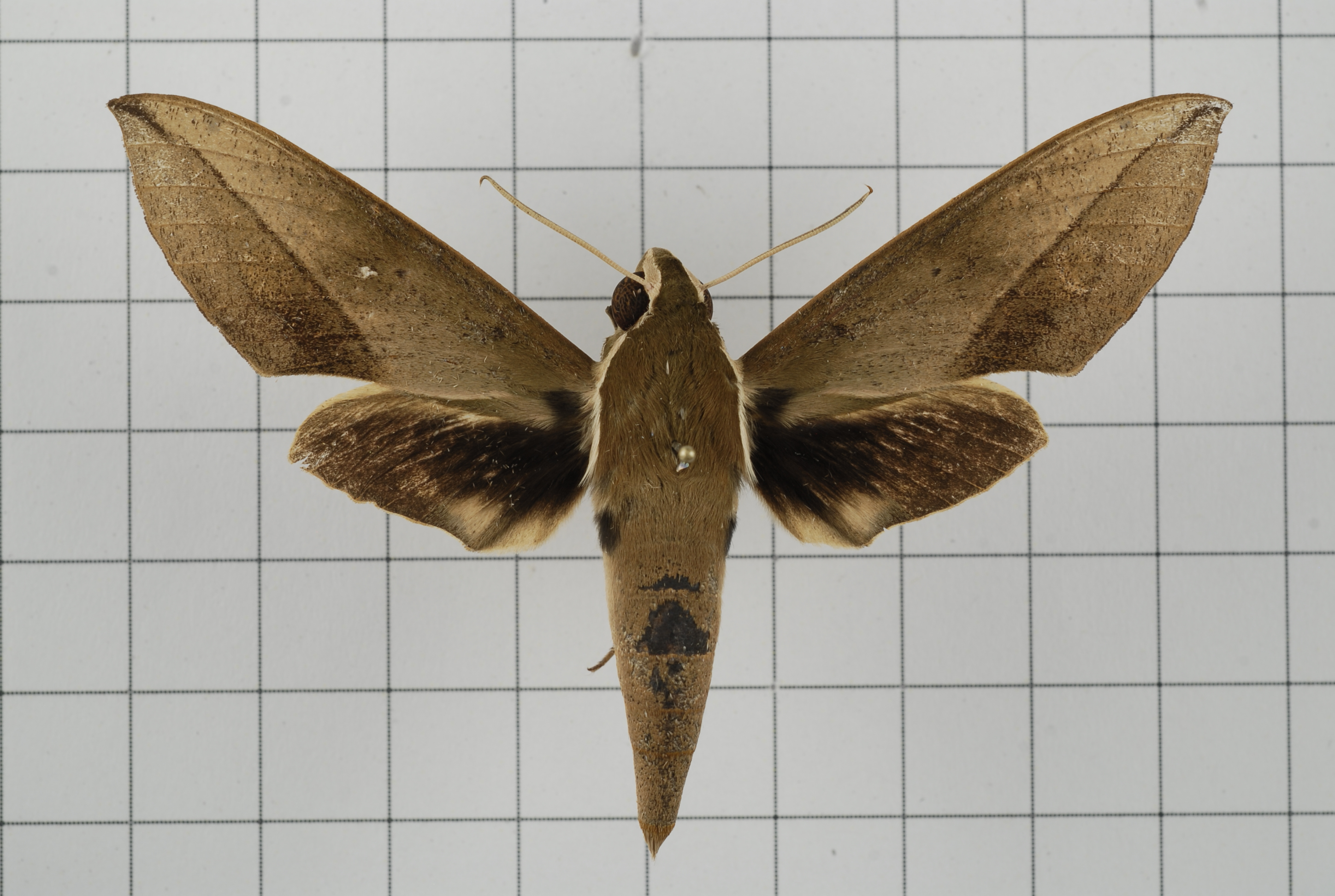

Scientific classification
- Kingdom: Animalia
- Phylum: Arthropoda
- Class: Insecta
- Order: Lepidoptera
- Family: Sphingidae
- Genus: Theretra
- Species: T. tibetiana

Binomial name
- Theretra tibetiana Vaglia & Haxaire, 2010

= Theretra tibetiana =

Species of moth

Theretra tibetiana is a species of moth in the family Sphingidae. It is known from south-east Asia.
