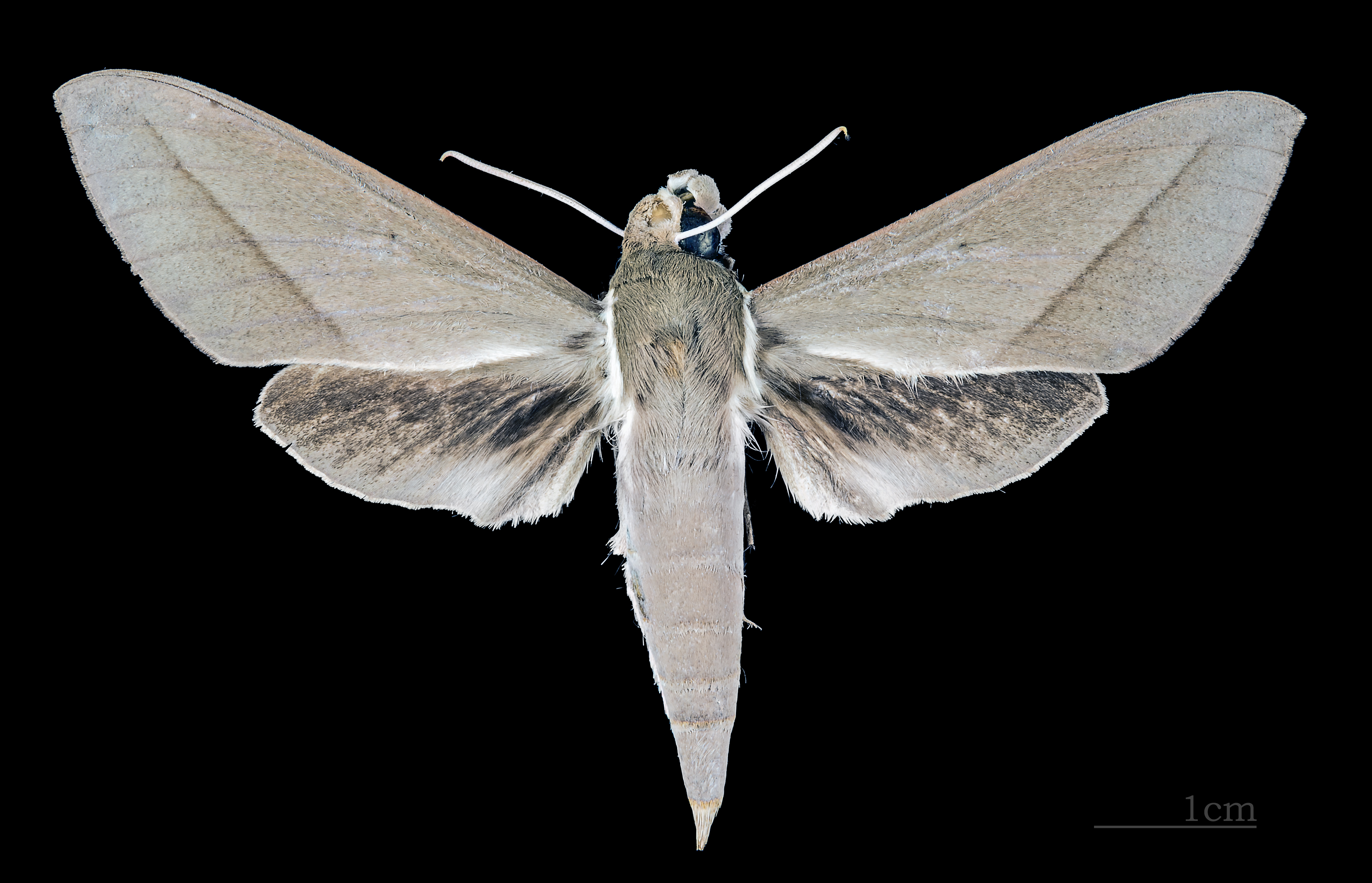
- Theretra incarnata dorsal MHNT
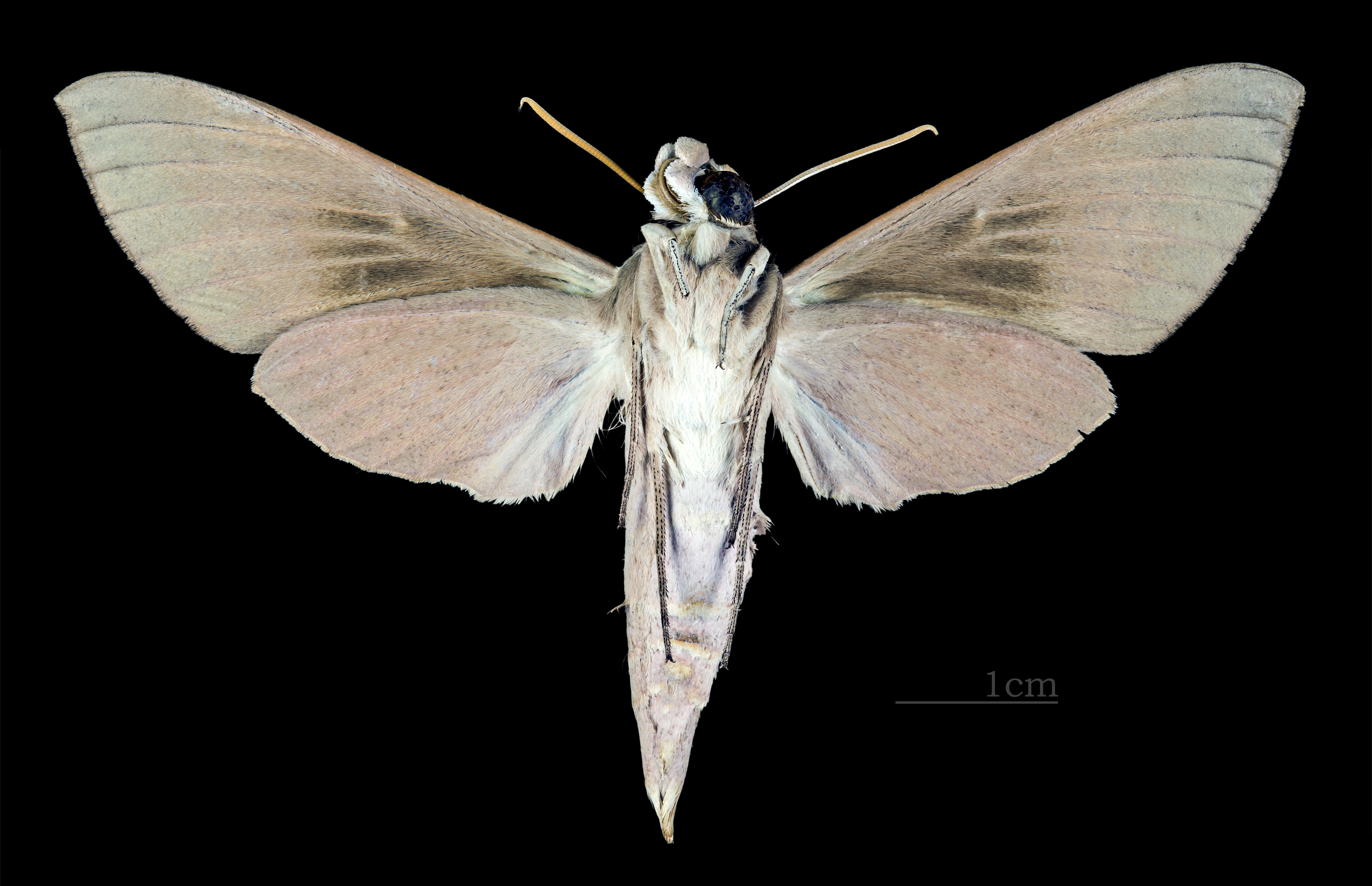
- Theretra incarnata ventral MHNT

Scientific classification
- Kingdom: Animalia
- Phylum: Arthropoda
- Class: Insecta
- Order: Lepidoptera
- Family: Sphingidae
- Genus: Theretra
- Species: T. incarnata

Binomial name
- Theretra incarnata Rothschild & Jordan, 1903

= Theretra incarnata =

Species of moth

Theretra incarnata is a moth of the family Sphingidae.

== Distribution ==
It is known from Indonesia and Australia.

The species is typically found in tropical and subtropical habitats where many members of the Sphingidae family are known to occur.
