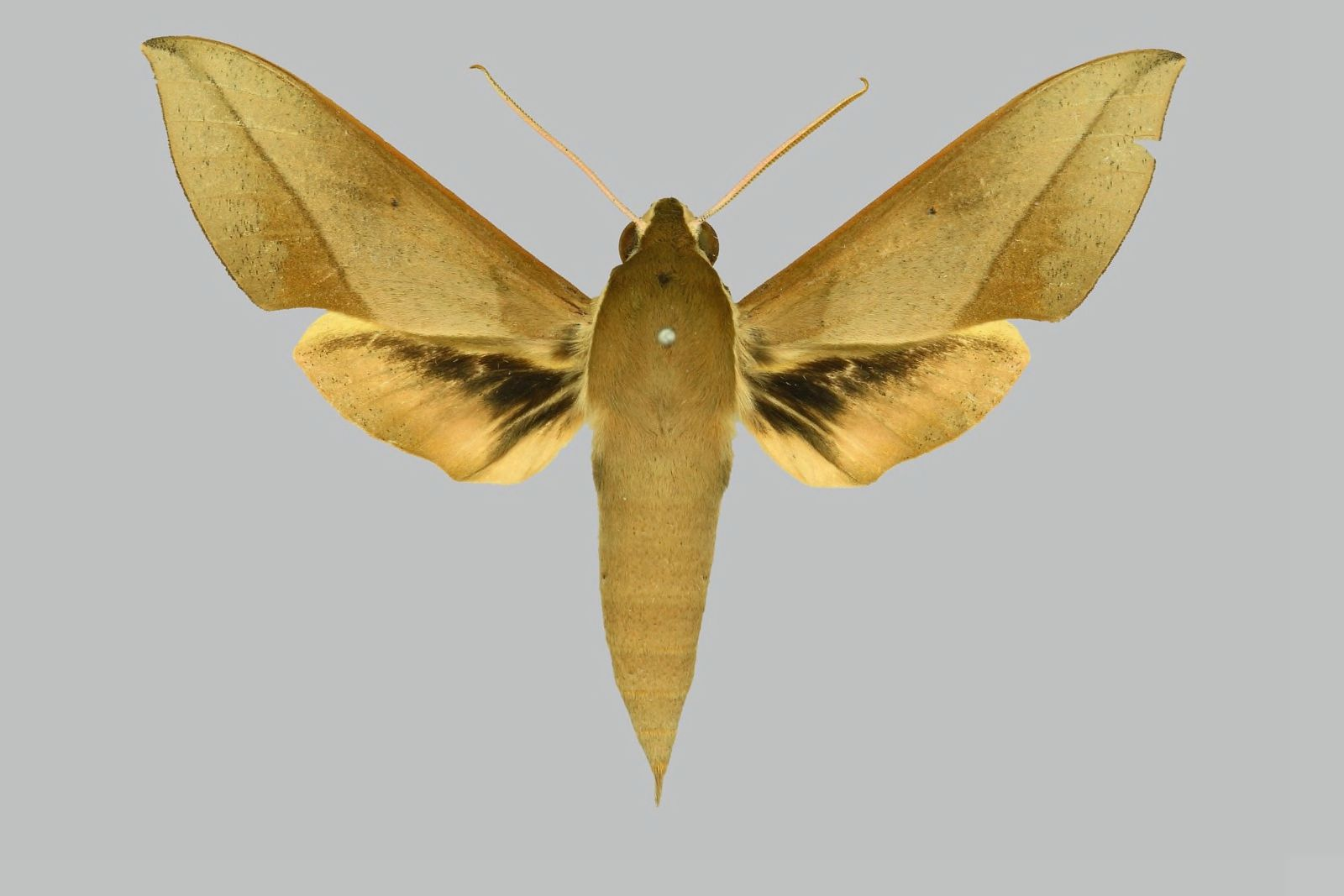

Scientific classification
- Kingdom: Animalia
- Phylum: Arthropoda
- Class: Insecta
- Order: Lepidoptera
- Family: Sphingidae
- Genus: Theretra
- Species: T. lifuensis

Binomial name
- Theretra lifuensis Rothschild, 1894

= Theretra lifuensis =

Species of moth

Theretra lifuensis is a moth of the family Sphingidae. It is known from the Loyalty Islands.
