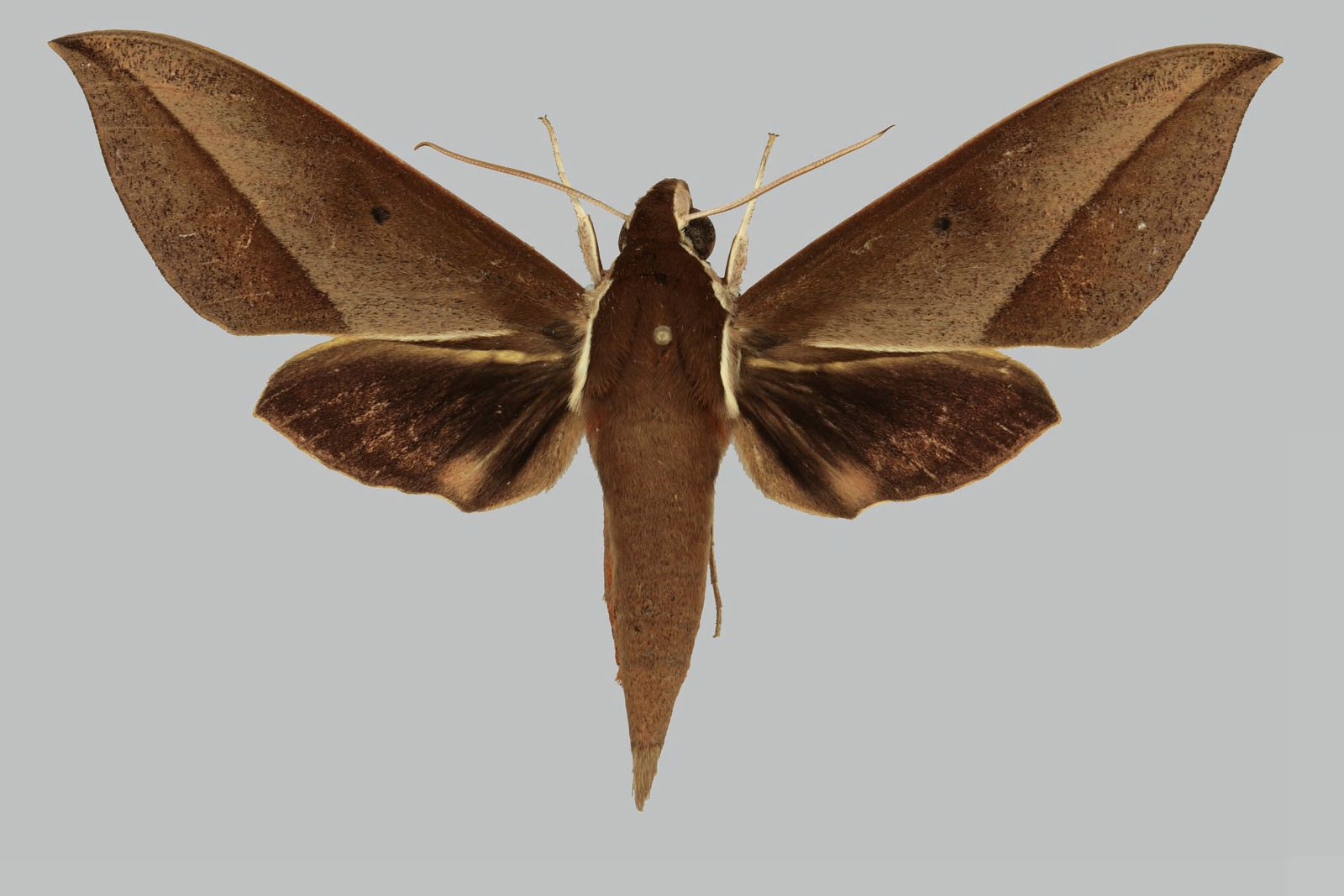

Scientific classification
- Kingdom: Animalia
- Phylum: Arthropoda
- Clade: Pancrustacea
- Class: Insecta
- Order: Lepidoptera
- Family: Sphingidae
- Genus: Theretra
- Species: T. sugii

Binomial name
- Theretra sugii Cadiou, 1995

= Theretra sugii =

Species of moth

Theretra sugii is a moth of the family Sphingidae. It is known from the Philippines.
