= Theretra alorica =

Scientific classification
- Kingdom: Animalia
- Phylum: Arthropoda
- Class: Insecta
- Order: Lepidoptera
- Family: Sphingidae
- Genus: Theretra
- Species: T. alorica

Binomial name
- Theretra alorica Eitschberger, 2010

Species of moth

Theretra alorica is a moth of the family Sphingidae. It is known from Alor Island, part of the eastern Lesser Sunda Islands of Indonesia.
