= Theretra sumbaensis =

Scientific classification
- Kingdom: Animalia
- Phylum: Arthropoda
- Class: Insecta
- Order: Lepidoptera
- Family: Sphingidae
- Genus: Theretra
- Species: T. sumbaensis

Binomial name
- Theretra sumbaensis Eitschberger, 2010

Species of moth

Theretra sumbaensis is a moth of the family Sphingidae. It is known from western Sumba in Indonesia.
