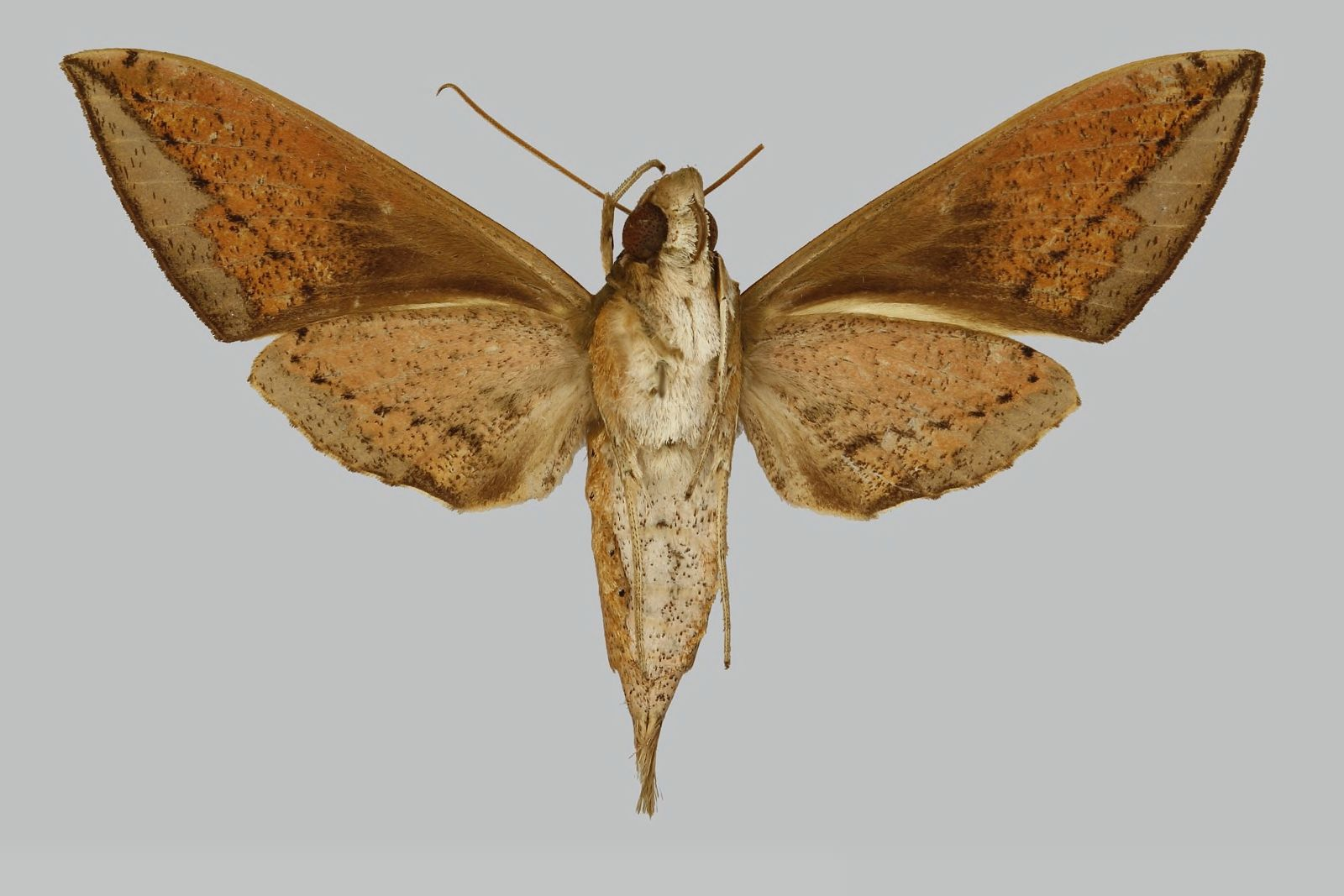
- Female Theretra hausmanni specimine.

Scientific classification
- Kingdom: Animalia
- Phylum: Arthropoda
- Class: Insecta
- Order: Lepidoptera
- Family: Sphingidae
- Genus: Theretra
- Species: T. hausmanni

Binomial name
- Theretra hausmanni Eitschberger, 2000

= Theretra hausmanni =

Species of moth

Theretra hausmanni is a moth of the family Sphingidae. It is known from Sulawesi in Indonesia.

The wingspan is 71–81 mm for males and 76–82 mm for females.
