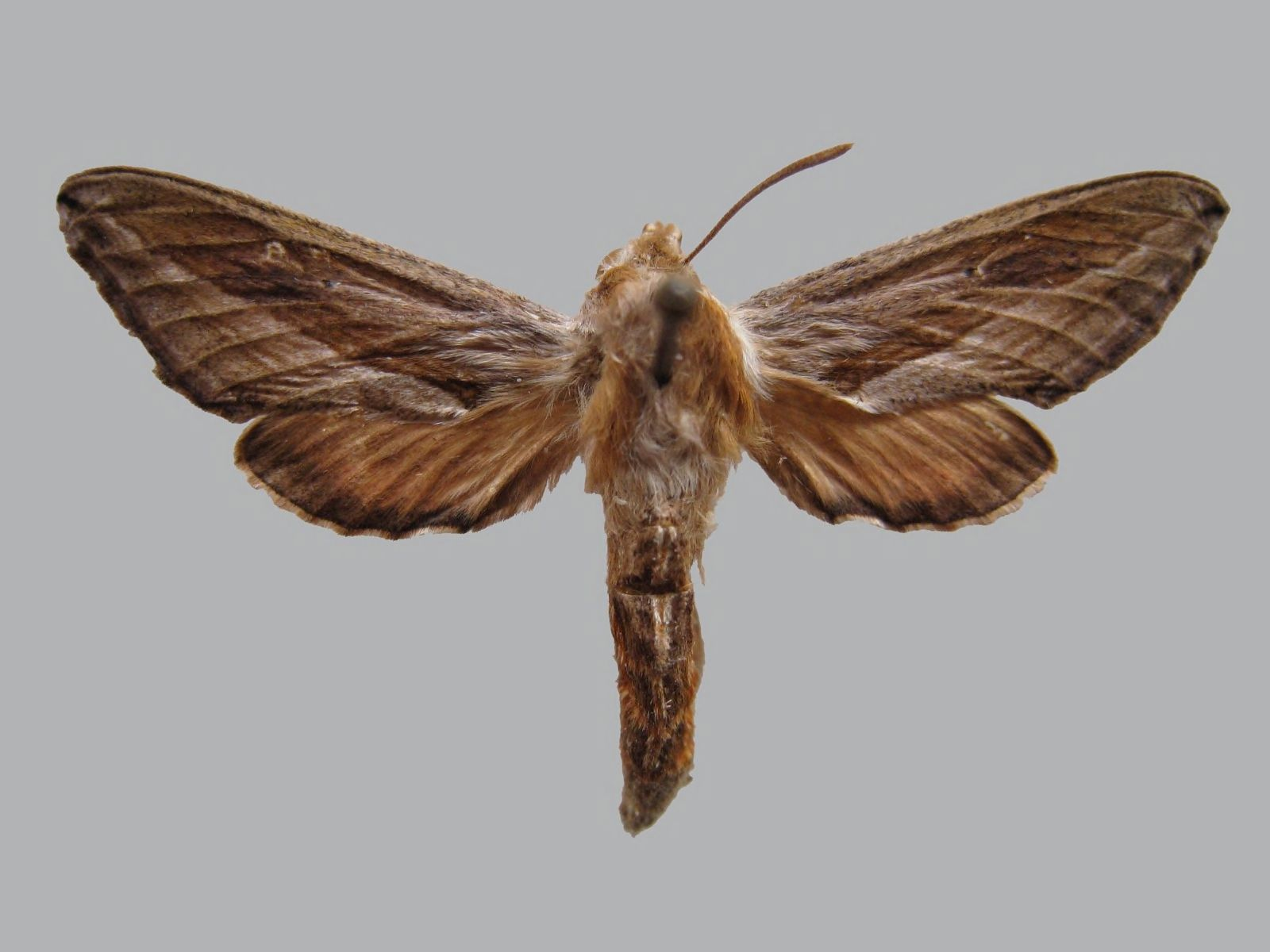
- Theretra tomasi (female)

Scientific classification
- Kingdom: Animalia
- Phylum: Arthropoda
- Class: Insecta
- Order: Lepidoptera
- Family: Sphingidae
- Genus: Theretra
- Species: T. tomasi

Binomial name
- Theretra tomasi Haxaire & Melichar, 2008

= Theretra tomasi =

Species of moth

Theretra tomasi is a moth of the family Sphingidae. It is known from Senegal.
