= Theretra halimuni =

Scientific classification
- Kingdom: Animalia
- Phylum: Arthropoda
- Class: Insecta
- Order: Lepidoptera
- Family: Sphingidae
- Genus: Theretra
- Species: T. halimuni

Binomial name
- Theretra halimuni Eitschberger, 2010

Species of moth

Theretra halimuni is a moth of the family Sphingidae. It is known from Java in Indonesia.
