= Theretra catherinae =

Scientific classification
- Kingdom: Animalia
- Phylum: Arthropoda
- Clade: Pancrustacea
- Class: Insecta
- Order: Lepidoptera
- Family: Sphingidae
- Genus: Theretra
- Species: T. catherinae

Binomial name
- Theretra catherinae Vaglia & Kitching, 2010

Species of moth

Theretra catherinae is a moth of the family Sphingidae. It comes from Sulawesi in Indonesia.
