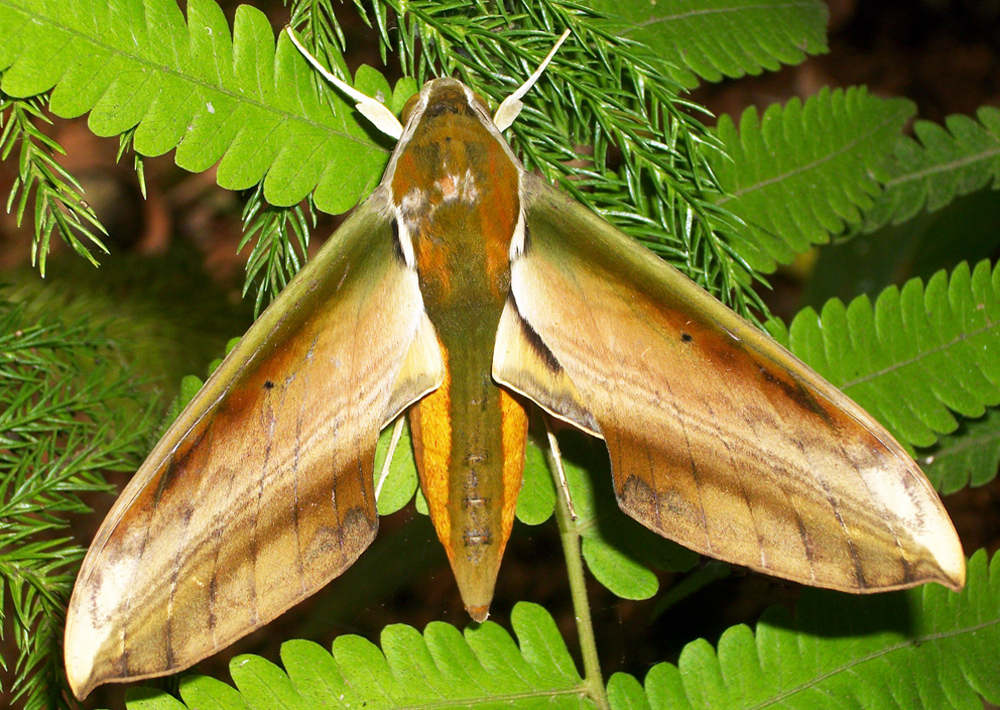
- Theretra nessus

Scientific classification
- Domain: Eukaryota
- Kingdom: Animalia
- Phylum: Arthropoda
- Class: Insecta
- Order: Lepidoptera
- Family: Sphingidae
- Subtribe: Choerocampina
- Genus: Theretra; Hübner, 1819

Type species
- Choerocampa indistincta Butler, 1877

Synonyms
- Florina Tutt, 1903; Gnathostypsis Wallengren, 1858; Hathia Moore, 1882; Oreus Hübner, 1819

= Theretra =

Genus of moths

Theretra is a genus of moths in the family Sphingidae. The genus was established by Jacob Hübner in 1819.

== Species ==
- Theretra acuta Vaglia & Liyous, 2010
- Theretra alecto (Linnaeus, 1758)
- Theretra alorica Eitschberger, 2010
- Theretra arfakmontensis Eitschberger, 2010
- Theretra balienensis Eitschberger, 2010
- Theretra boisduvalii (Bugnion, 1839)
- Theretra cajus (Cramer, 1777)
- Theretra capensis (Linnaeus, 1764)
- Theretra castanea (Moore, 1872)
- Theretra catherinae Vaglia & Kitching, 2010
- Theretra celata (Butler, 1877)
- Theretra clotho (Drury, 1773)
- Theretra floresica Eitschberger, 2010
- Theretra gala Cadiou, 1999
- Theretra gnoma (Fabricius, 1775)
- Theretra griseomarginata (Hampson, 1898)
- Theretra halimuni Eitschberger, 2010
- Theretra hausmanni Eitschberger, 2000
- Theretra improvisa Darge, 2006
- Theretra incarnata Rothschild & Jordan, 1903
- Theretra indistincta (Butler, 1877)
- Theretra inornata (Walker, 1865)
- Theretra insignis (Butler, 1882)
- Theretra insularis (C. Swinhoe, 1892)
- Theretra japonica (Boisduval, 1869)
- Theretra jugurtha (Boisduval, 1875)
- Theretra kuehni Rothschild, 1900
- Theretra latreillii (W. S. Macleay, 1826)
- Theretra lifuensis Rothschild, 1894
- Theretra lomblenica Eitschberger, 2010
- Theretra lombokensis Eitschberger, 2010
- Theretra lycetus (Cramer, 1775)
- Theretra manilae Clark, 1922
- Theretra mansoni Clark, 1924
- Theretra margarita (Kirby, 1877)
- Theretra molops Jordan, 1926
- Theretra monteironis (Butler, 1882)
- Theretra muricolor Jordan, 1926
- Theretra natashae Cadiou, 1995
- Theretra nessus (Drury, 1773)
- Theretra oldenlandiae (Fabricius, 1775)
- Theretra orpheus (Herrich-Schäffer, 1854)
- Theretra pallicosta (Walker, 1856)
- Theretra pantarica Eitschberger, 2010
- Theretra papuensis Eitschberger, 2009
- Theretra perkeo Rothschild & Jordan, 1903
- Theretra polistratus Rothschild, 1904
- Theretra queenslandi (Lucas, 1891)
- Theretra radiosa Rothschild & Jordan, 1916
- Theretra rhesus (Boisduval, 1875)
- Theretra silhetensis (Walker, 1856)
- Theretra suffusa (Walker, 1856)
- Theretra sugii Cadiou, 1995
- Theretra sumatrensis (Joicey & Kaye, 1917)
- Theretra sumbaensis Eitschberger, 2010
- Theretra tabibulensis Lachlan, 2009
- Theretra tessmanni Gehlen, 1927
- Theretra tibetiana Vaglia & Haxaire, 2010
- Theretra timorensis Eitschberger, 2010
- Theretra tomasi Haxaire & Melichar, 2008
- Theretra tryoni (Miskin, 1891)
- Theretra turneri (Lucas, 1891)
- Theretra viridis Basquin, 1992
- Theretra wetanensis Eitschberger, 2010
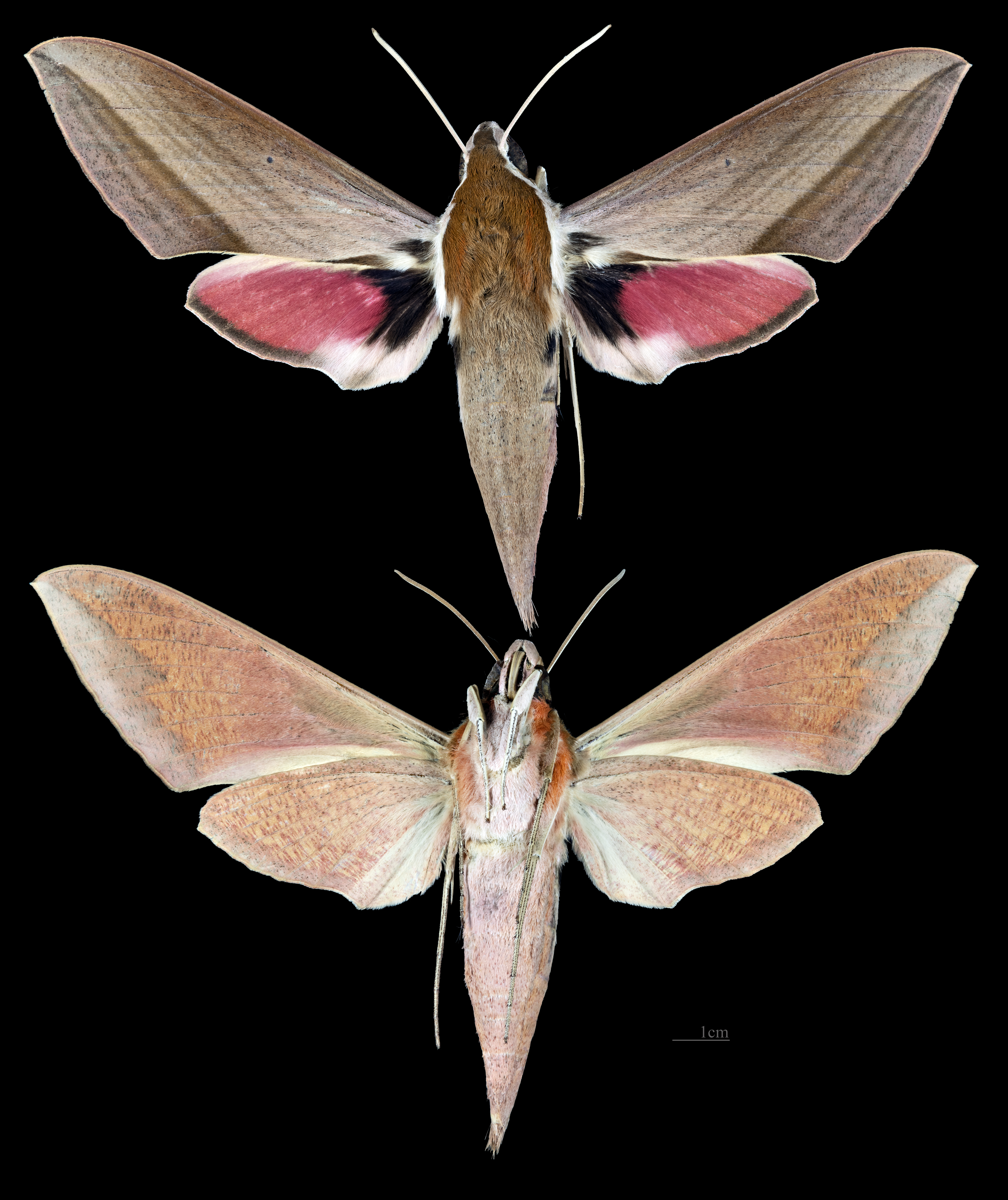
Theretra alecto

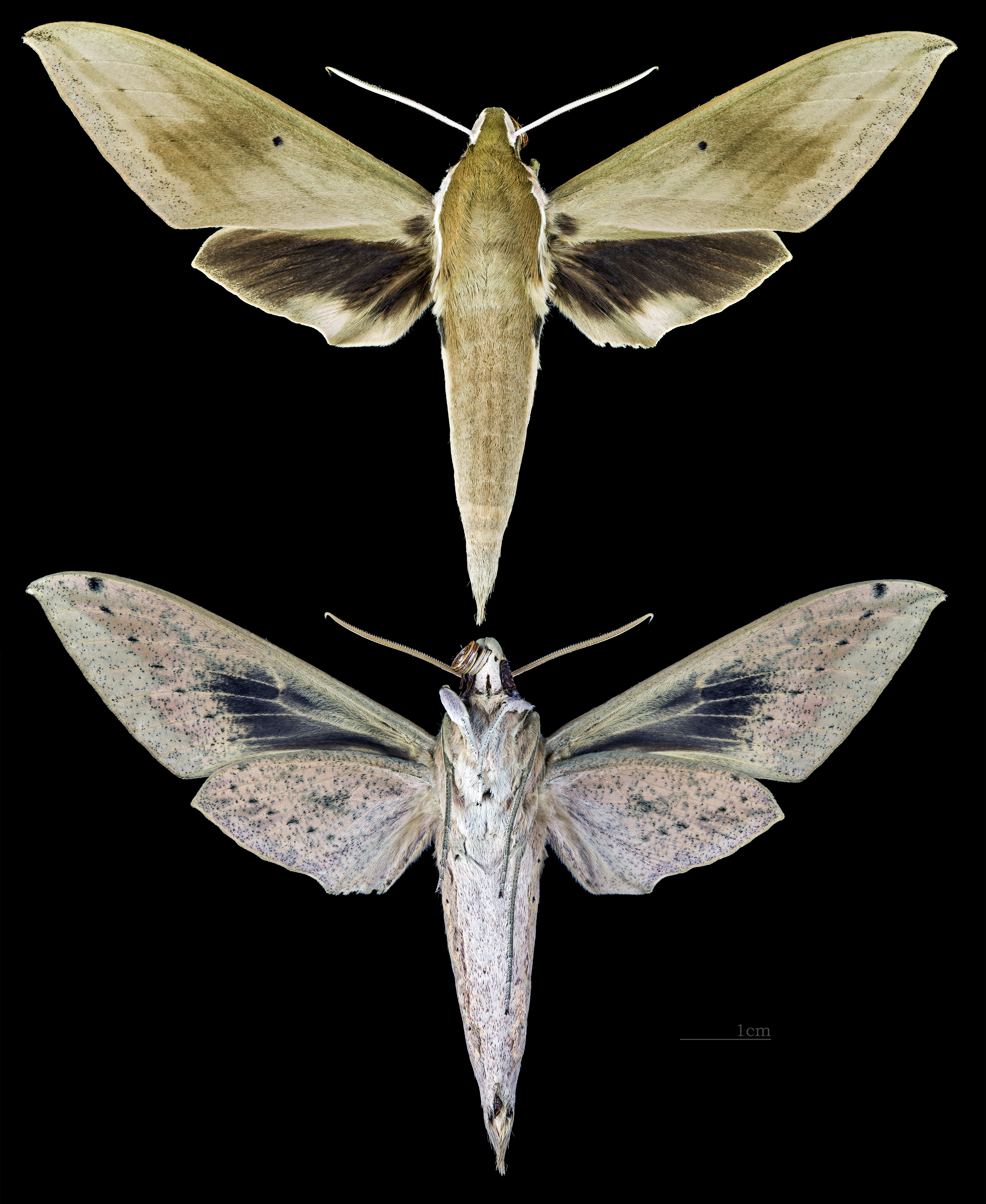
Theretra boisduvalii

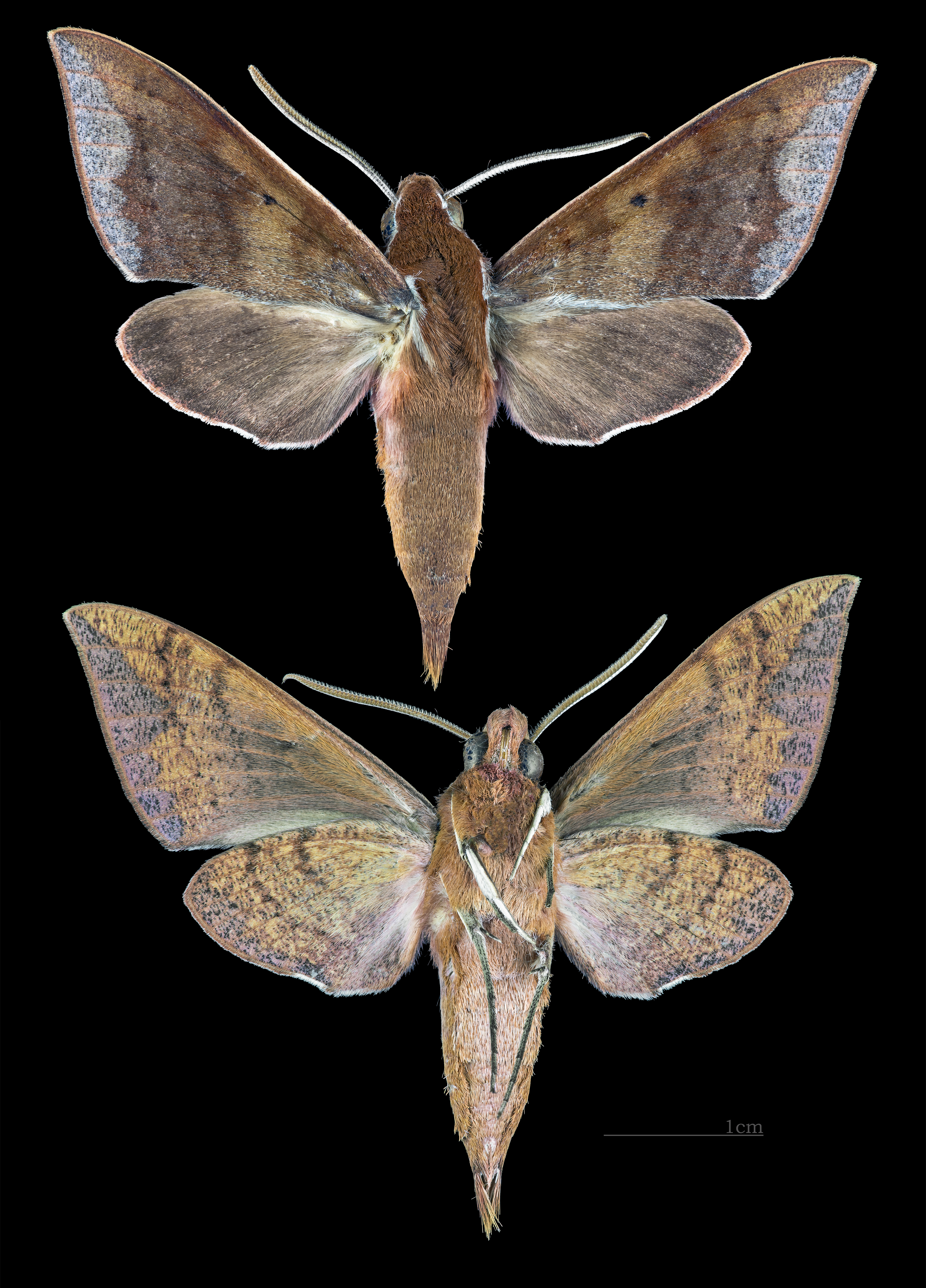
Theretra castanea

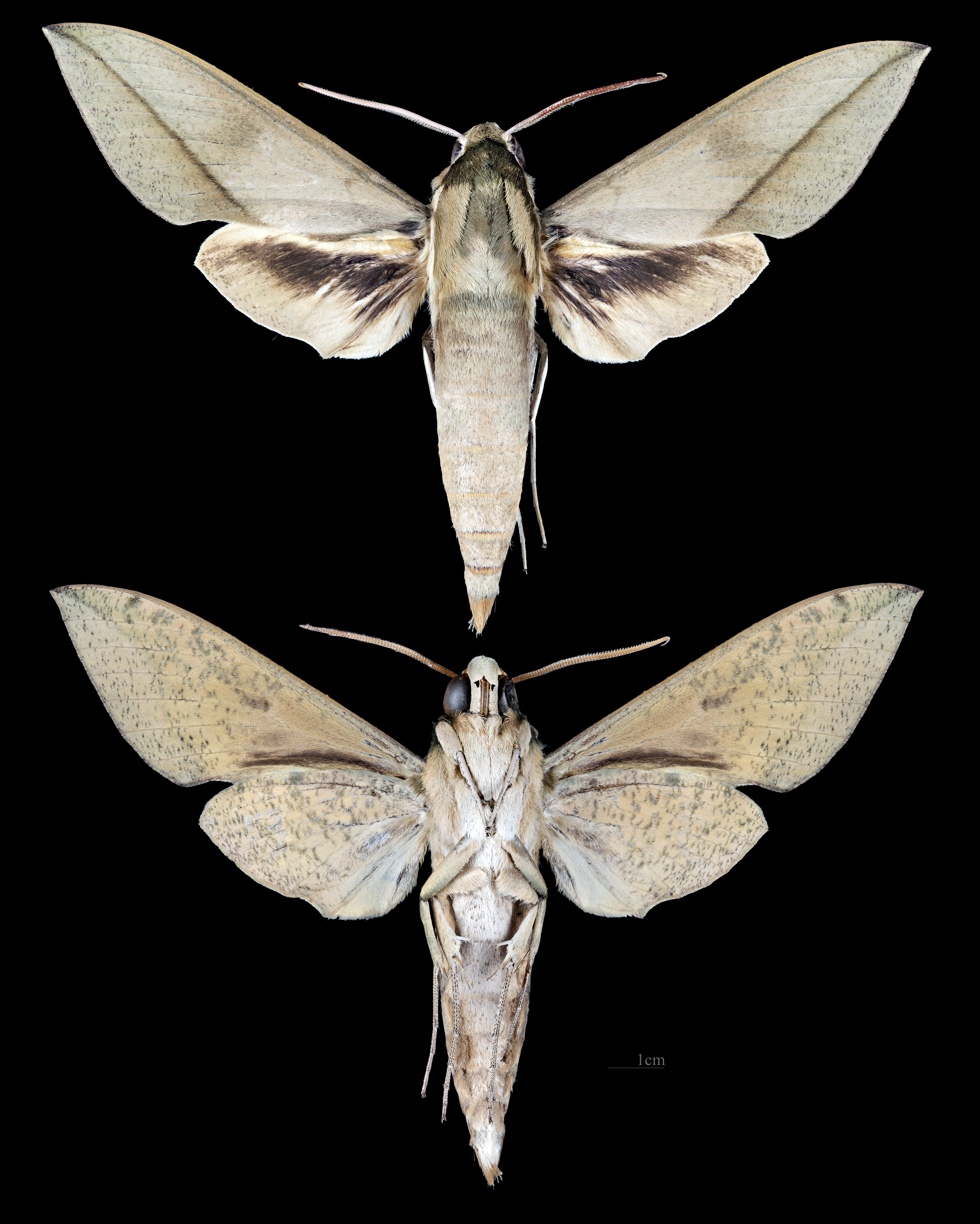
Theretra celata

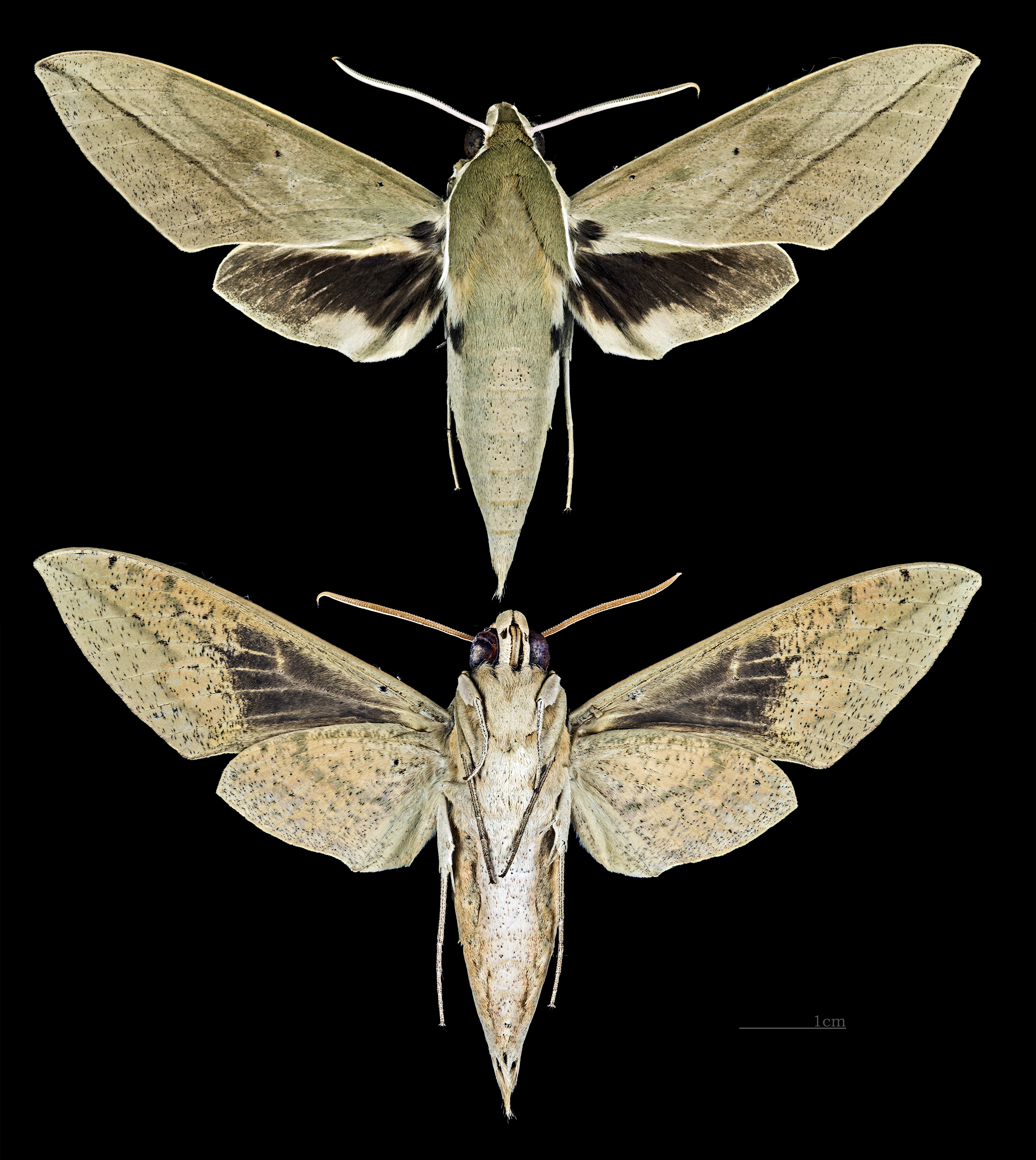
Theretra clotho

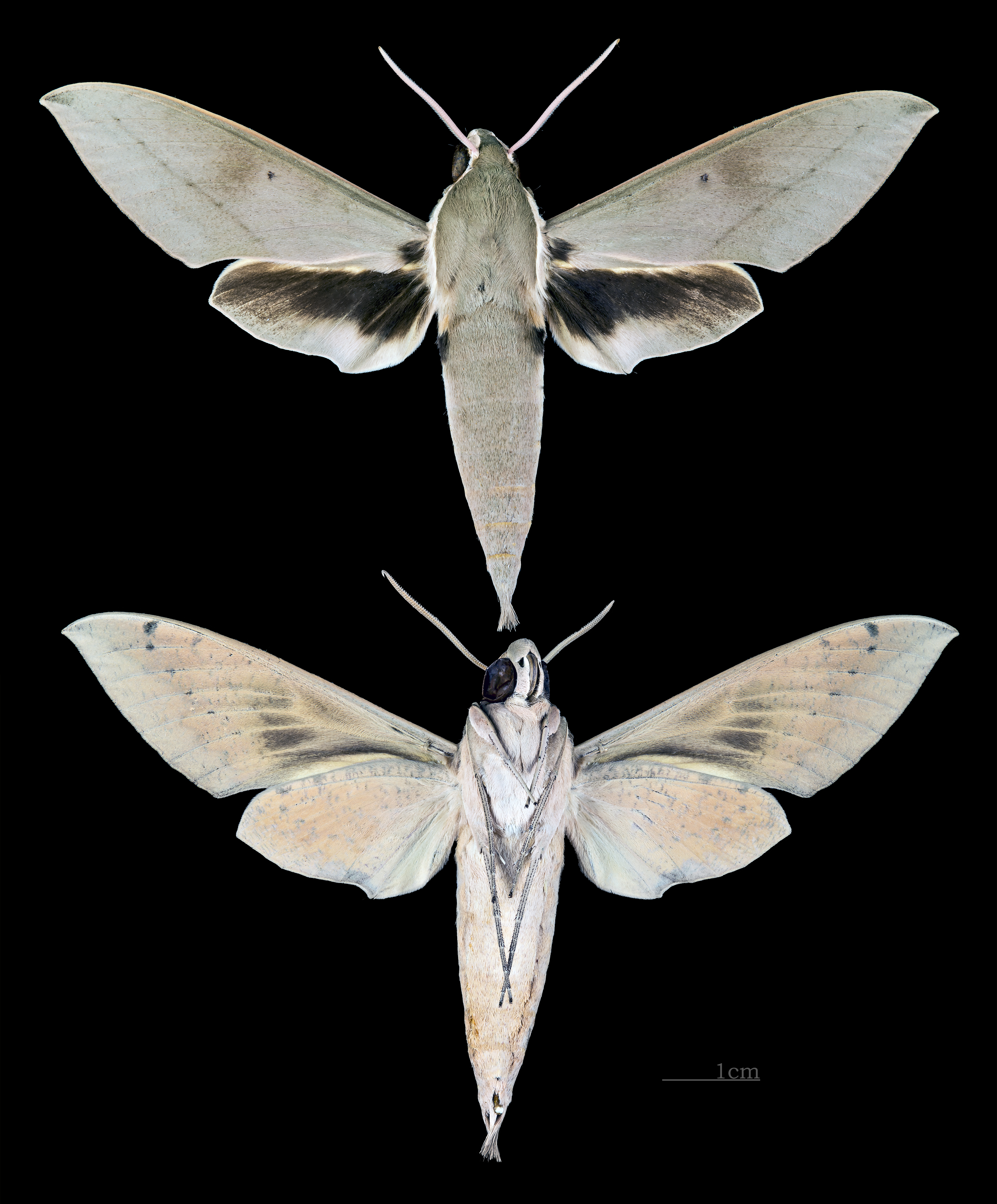
Theretra gnoma

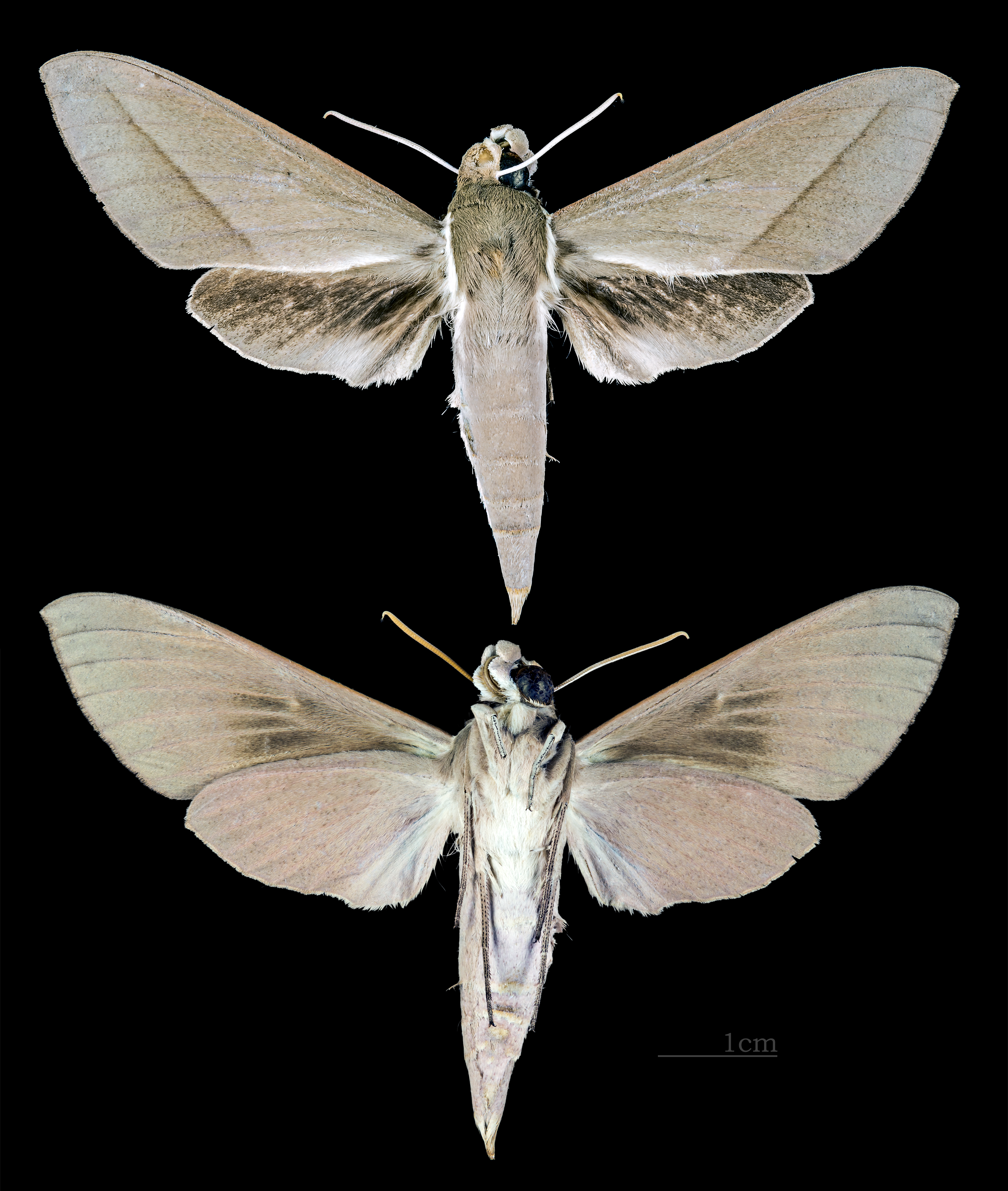
Theretra incarnata

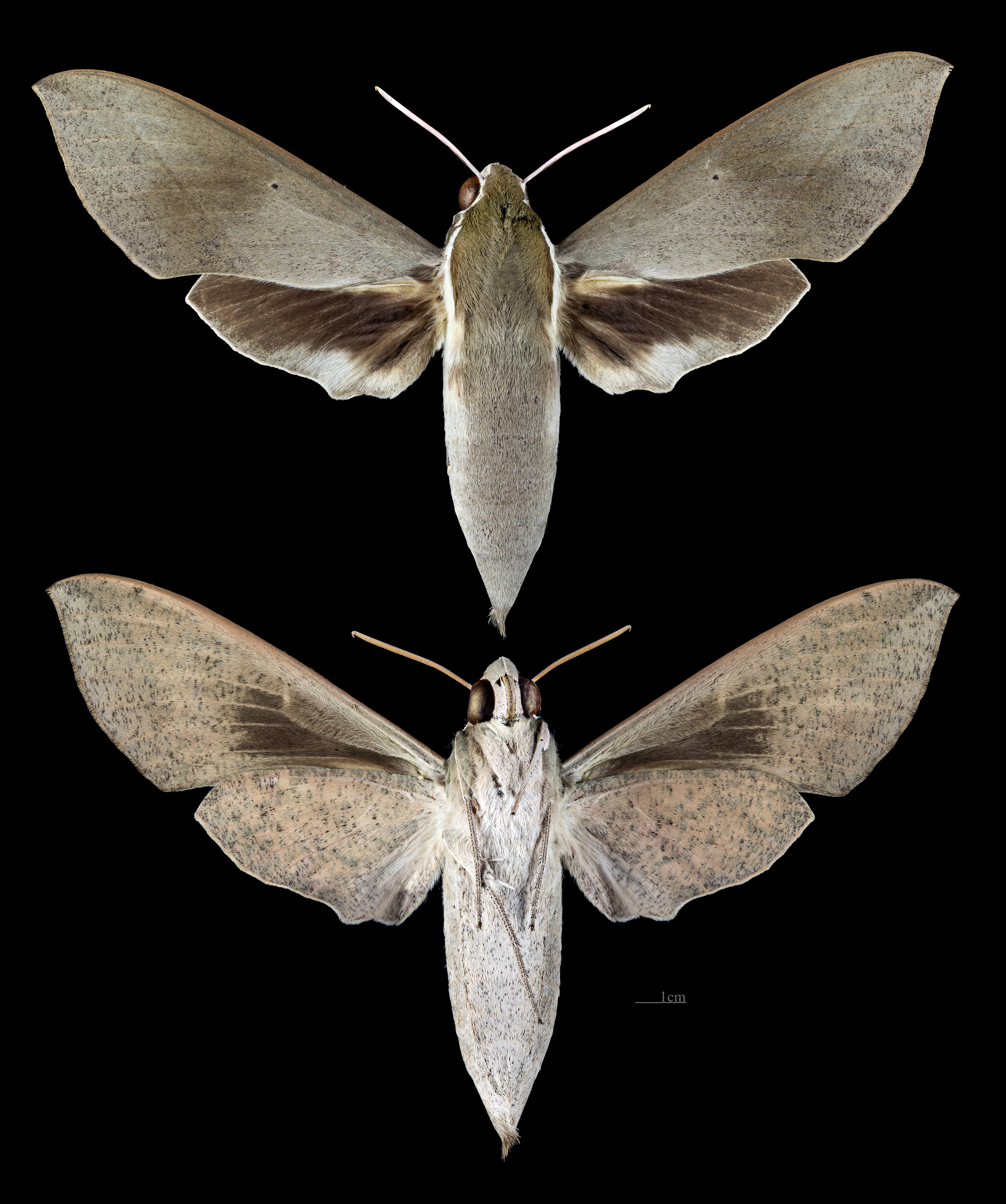
Theretra indistincta

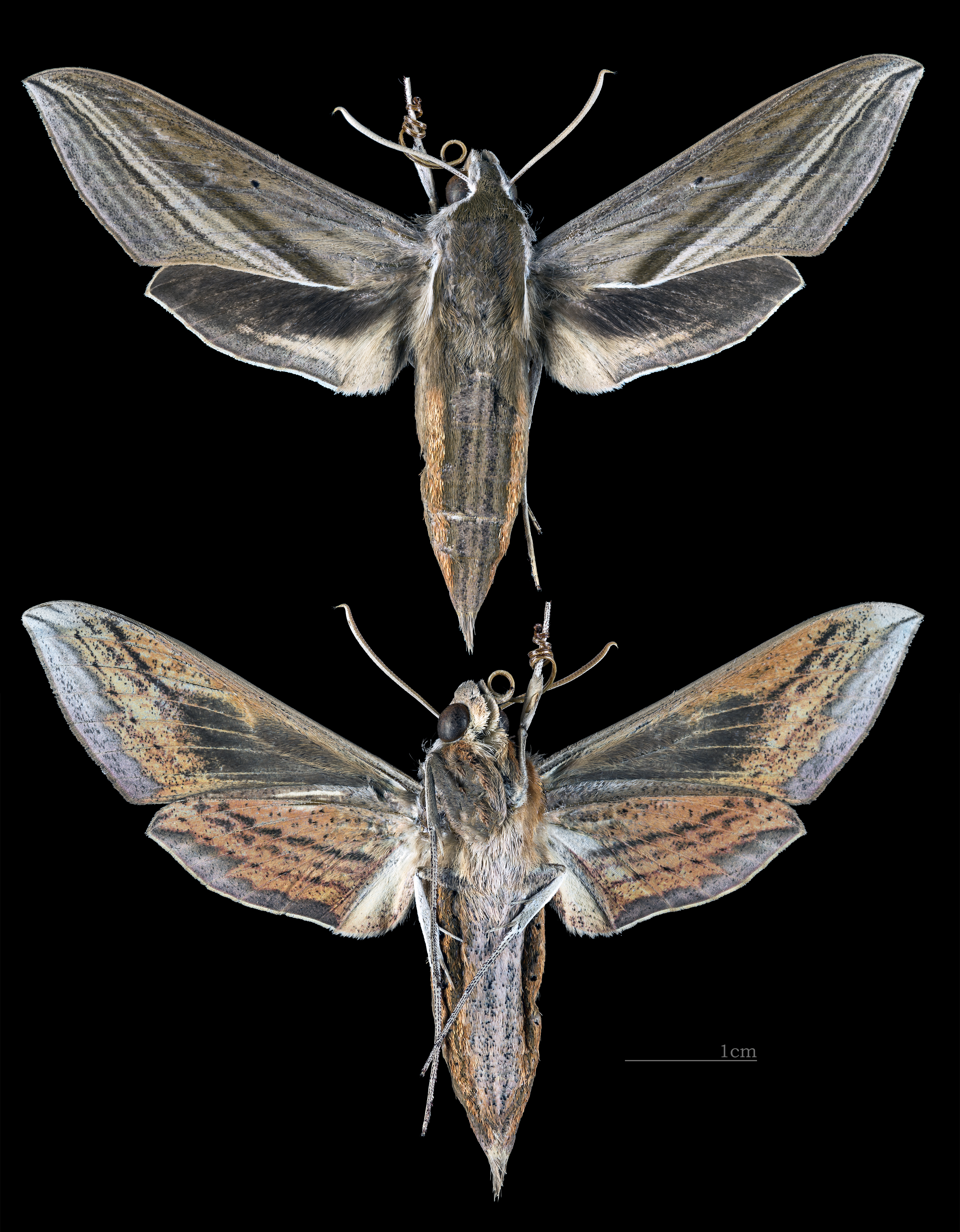
Theretra japonica

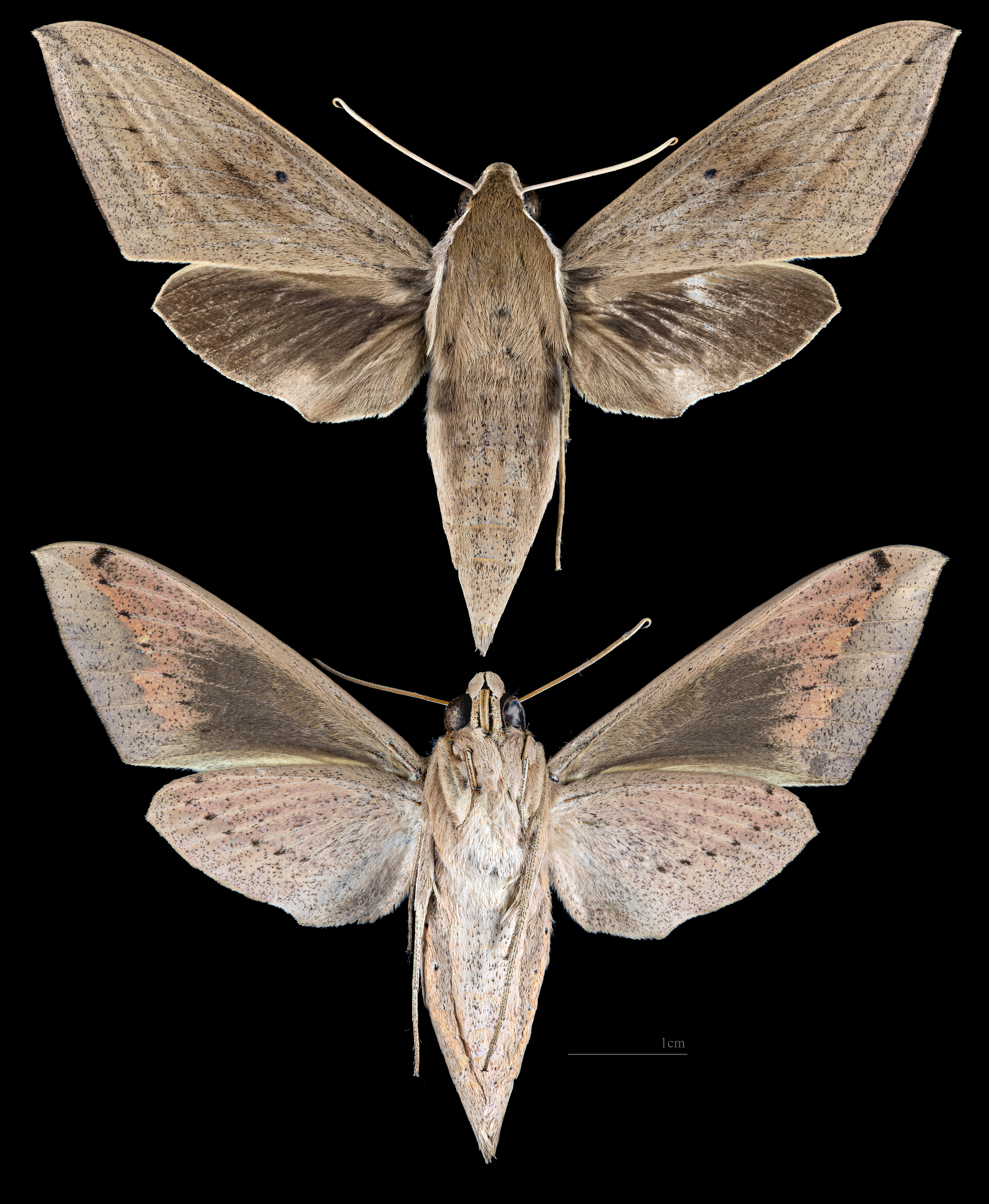
Theretra latreillii

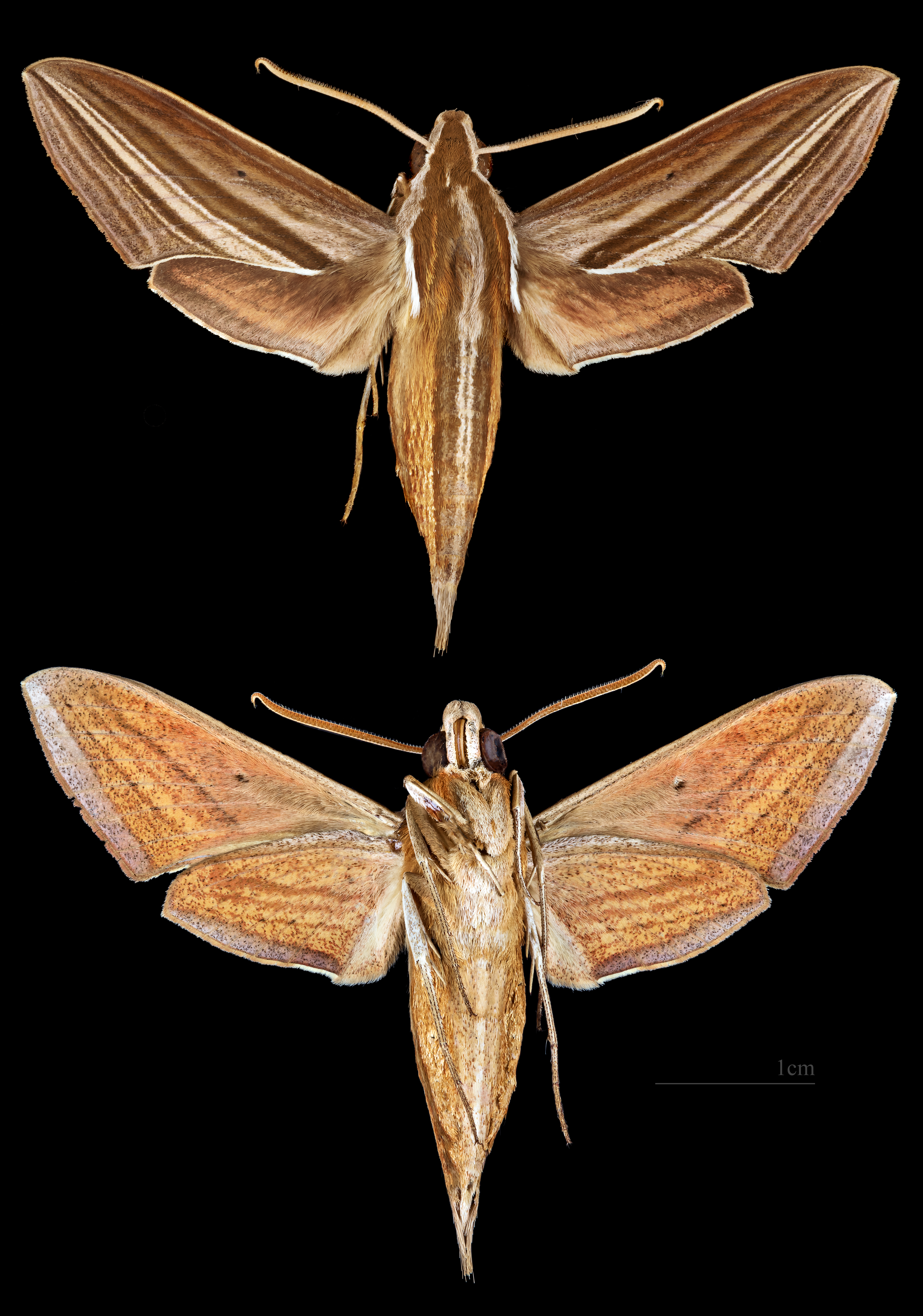
Theretra lycetus

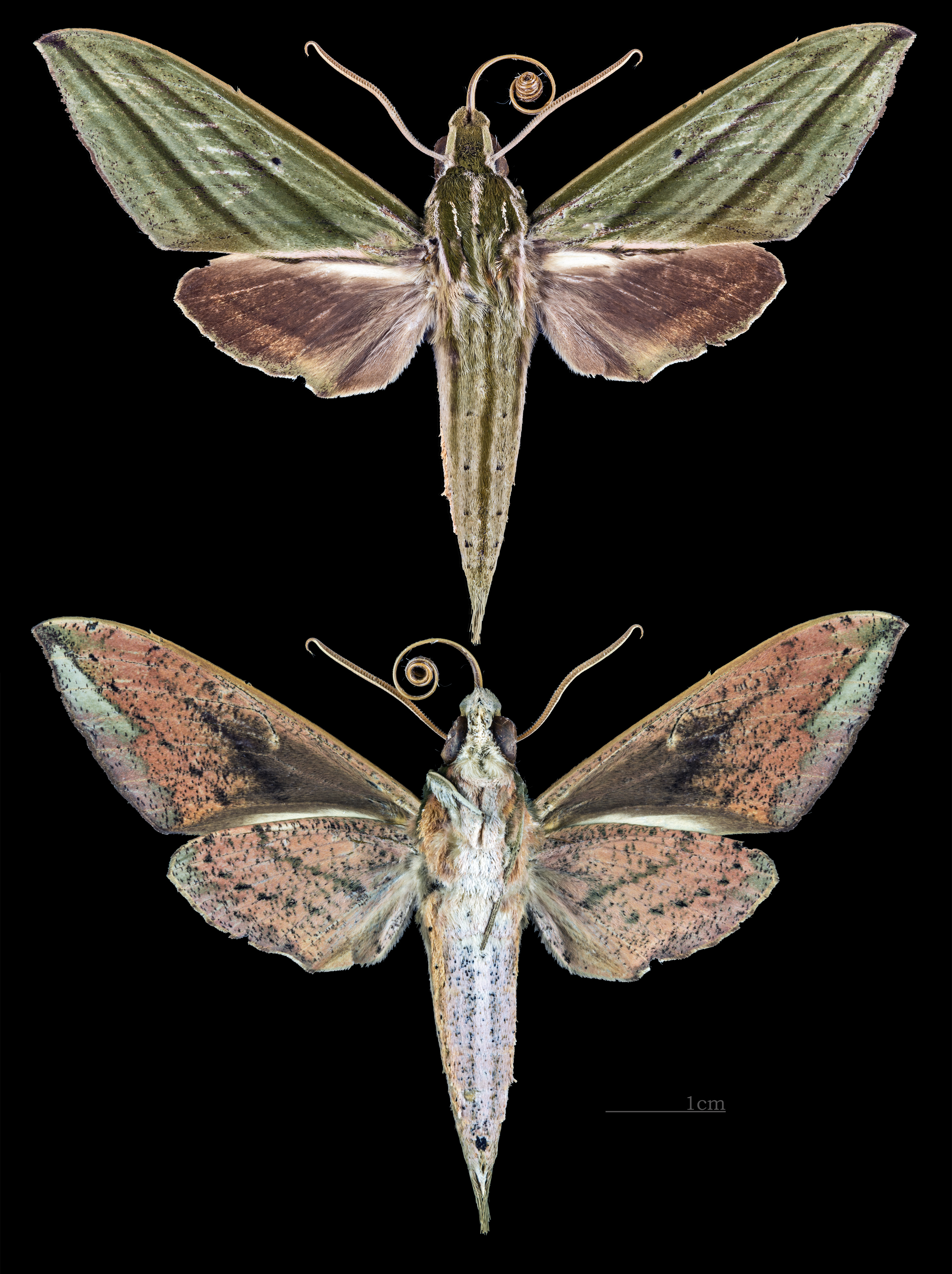
Theretra manilae

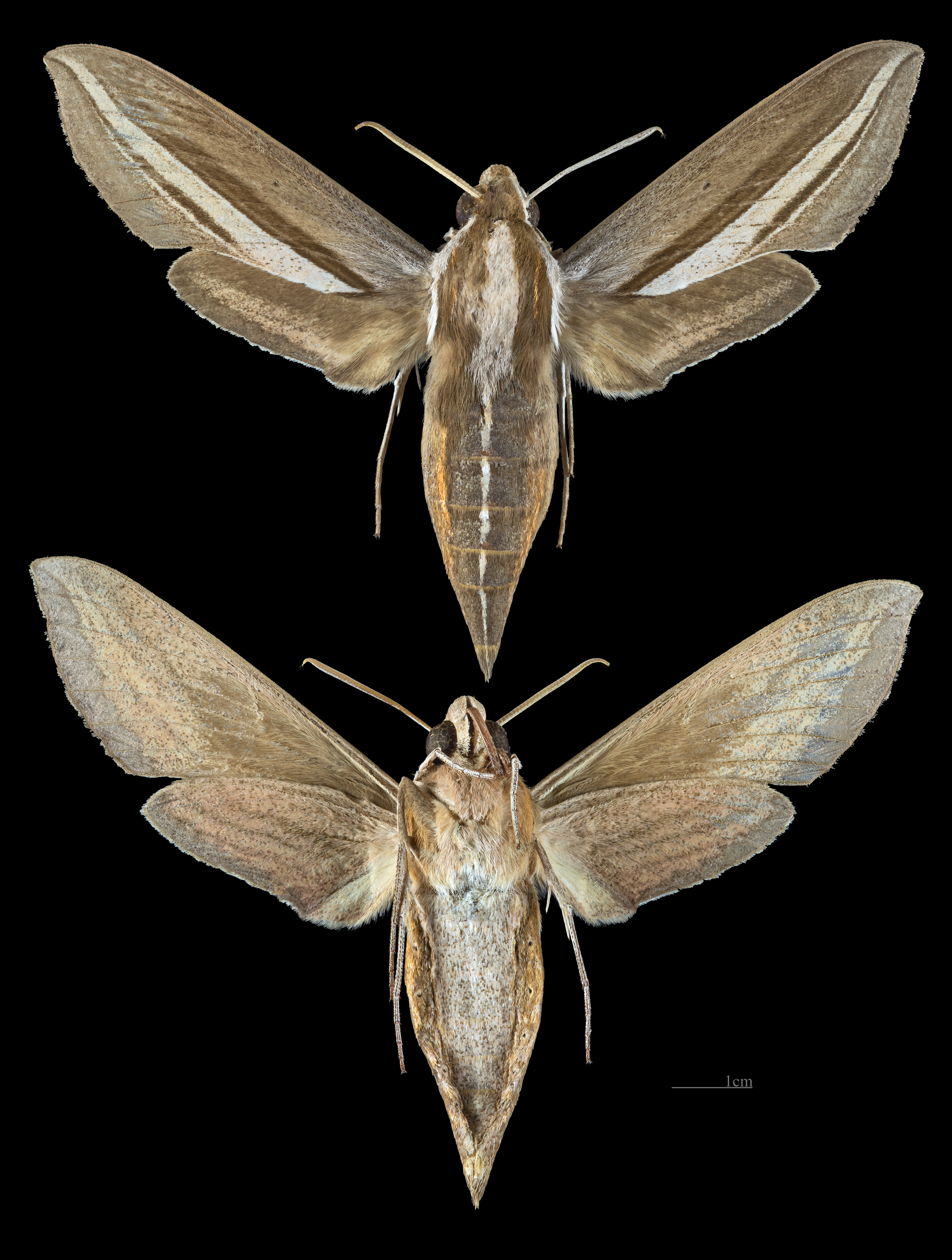
Theretra margarita

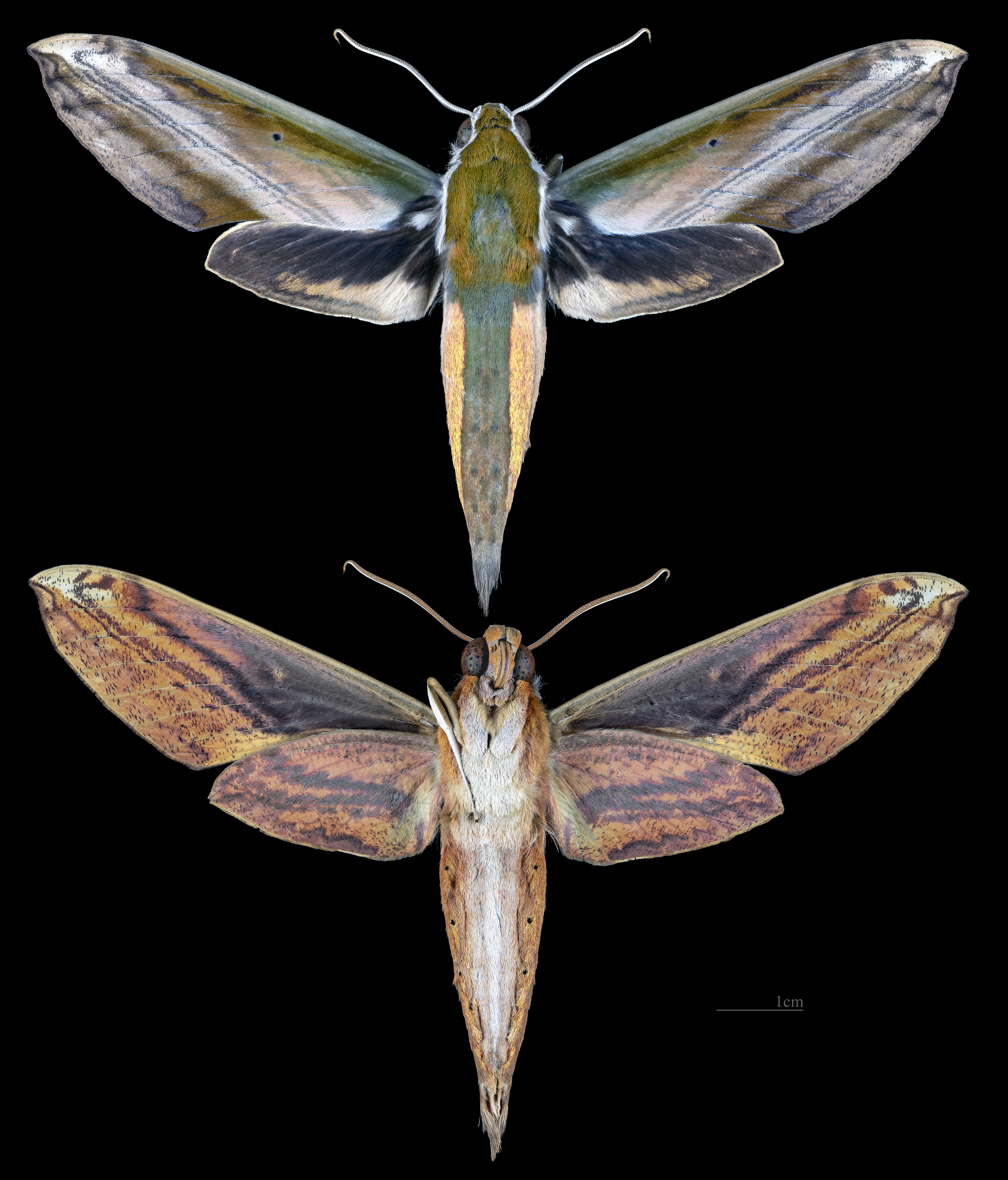
Theretra nessus

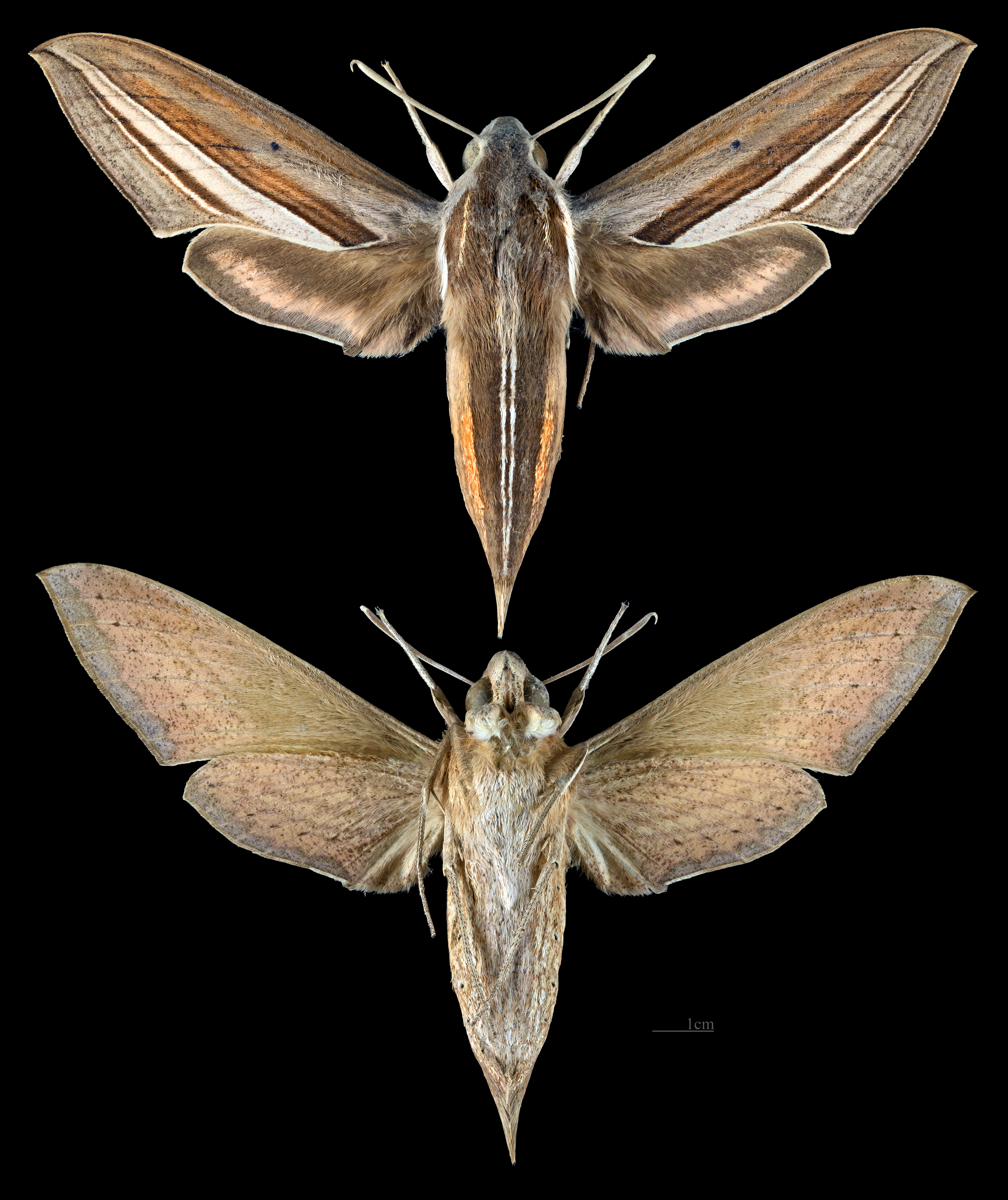
Theretra oldenlandiae

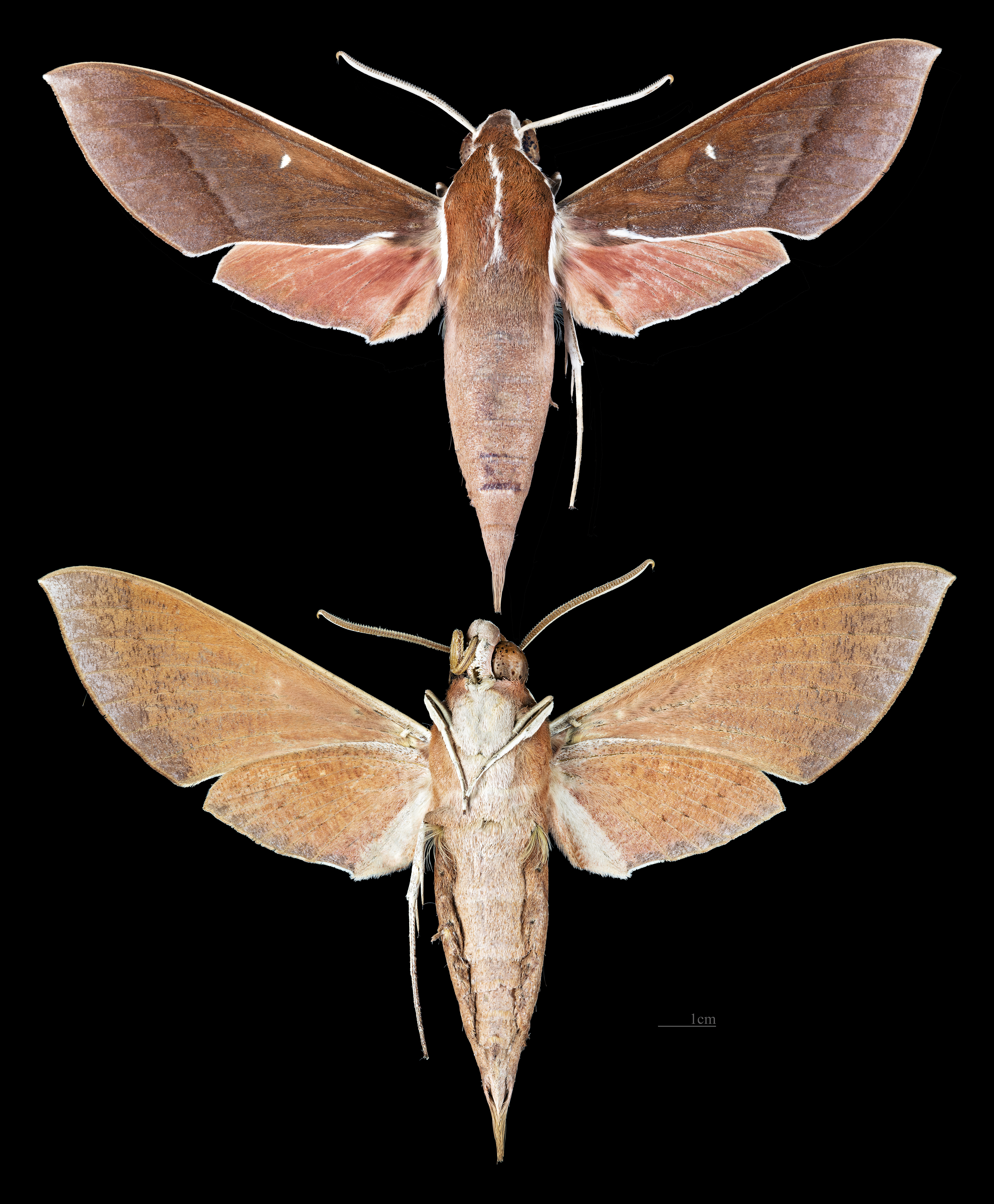
Theretra pallicosta

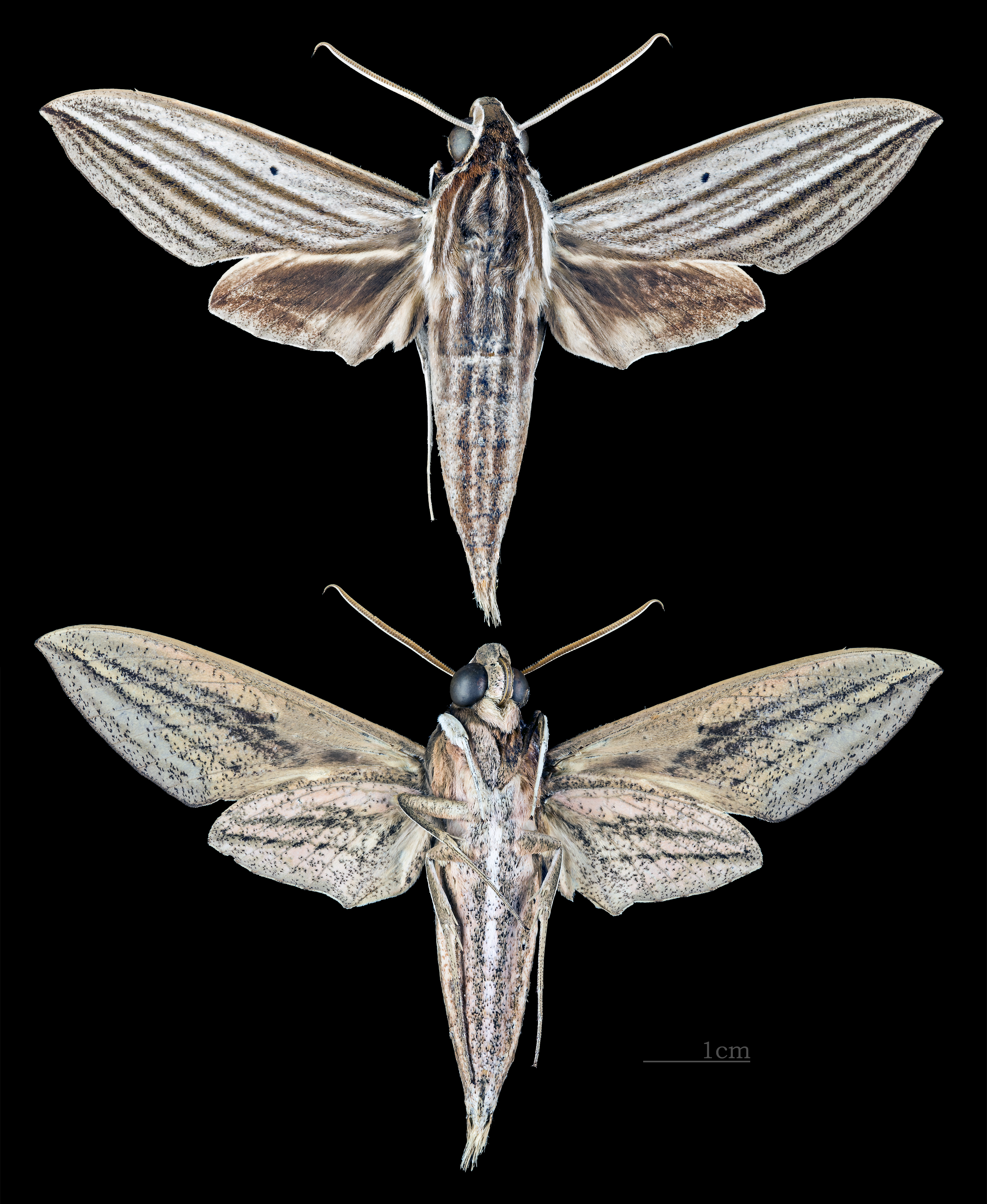
Theretra polistratus

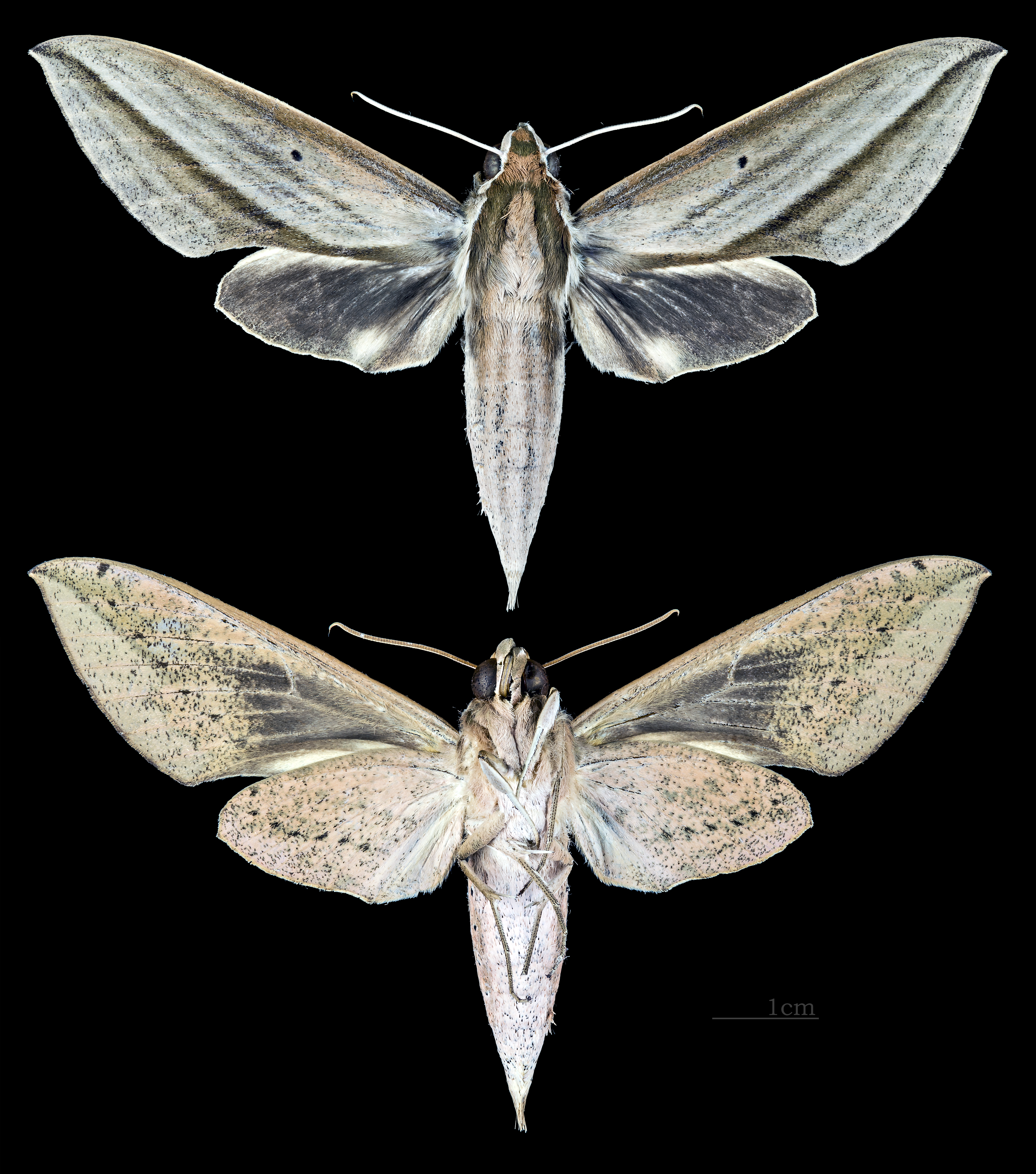
Theretra queenslandi

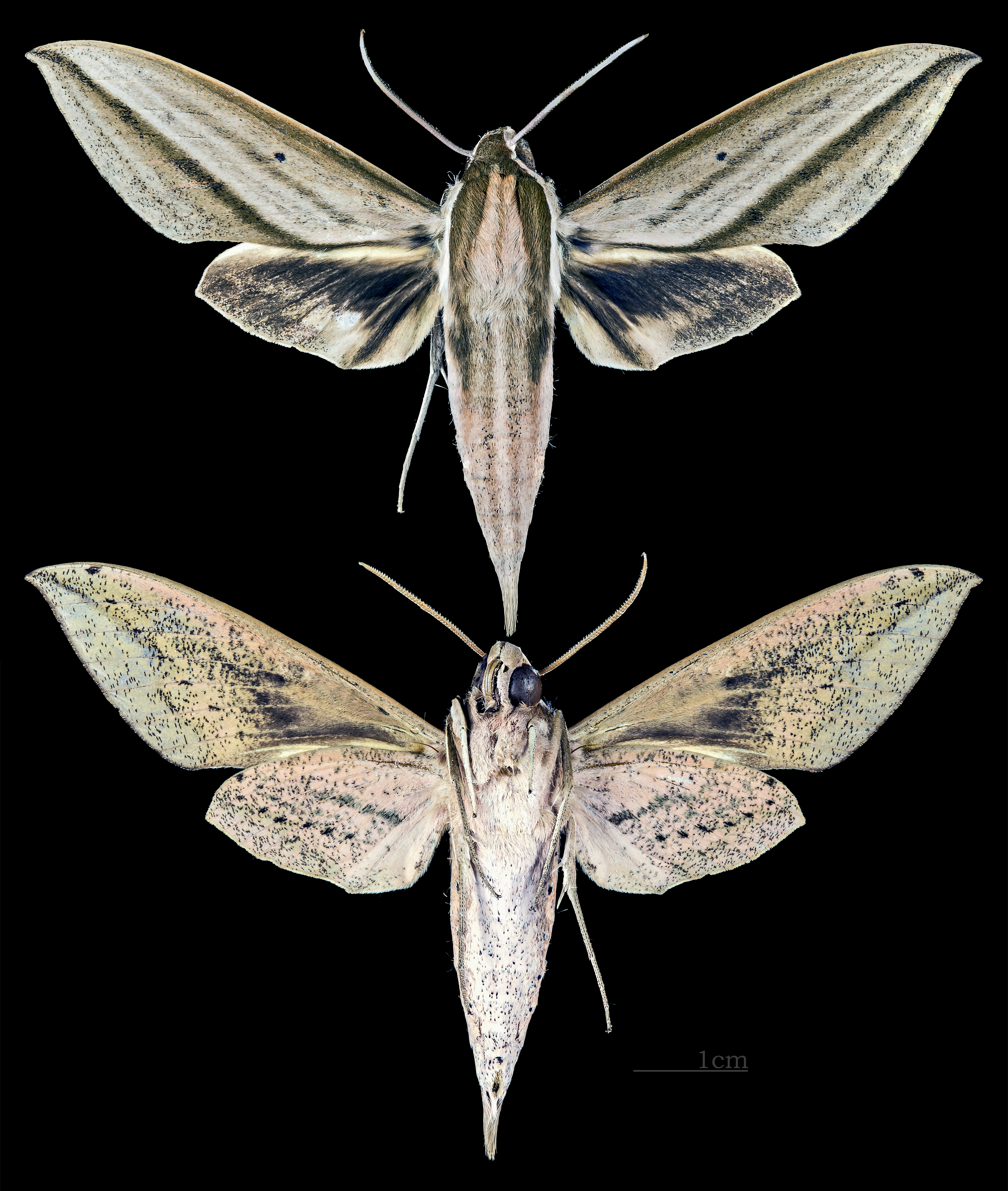
Theretra radiosa

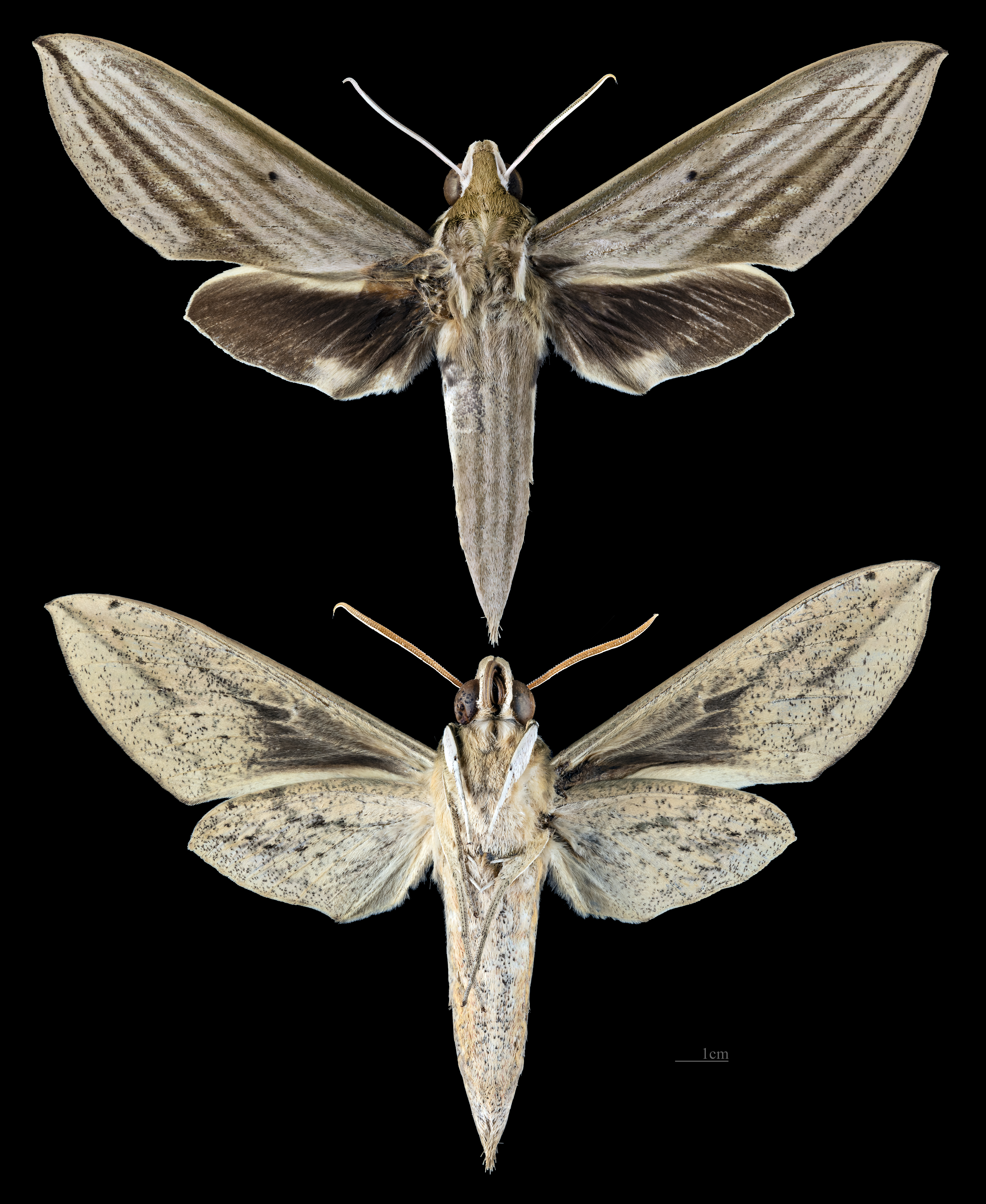
Theretra rhesus

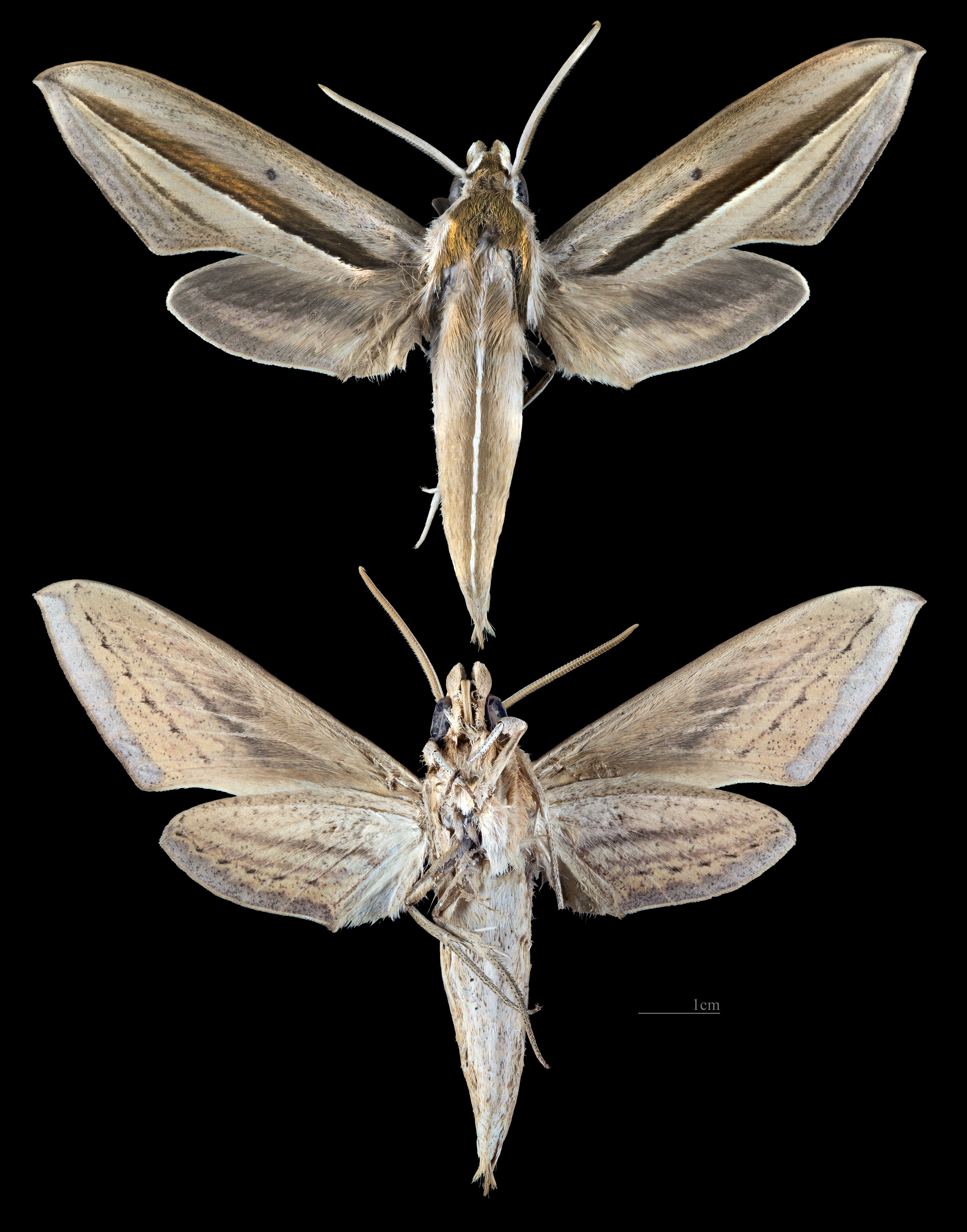
Theretra silhetensis

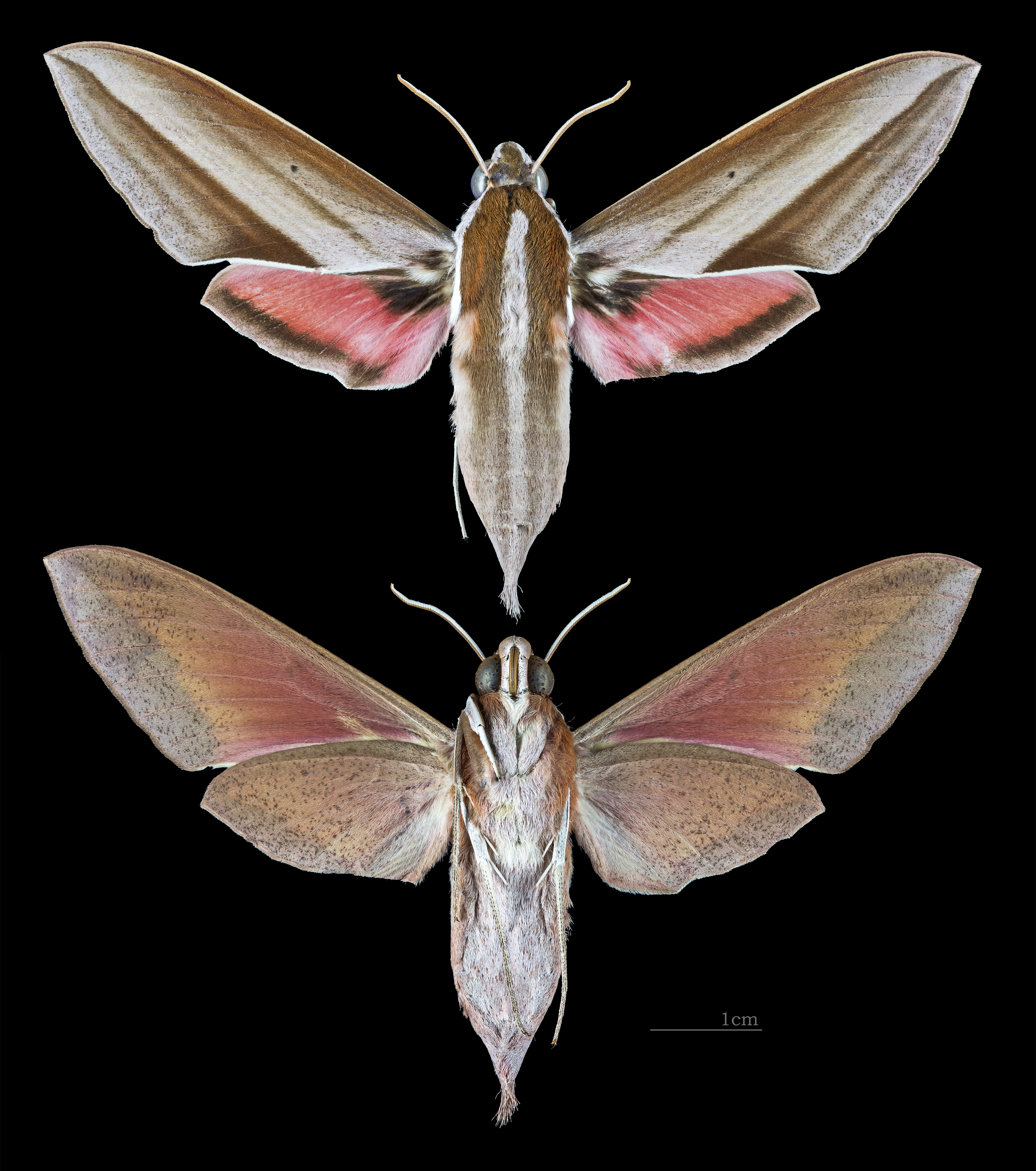
Theretra suffusa

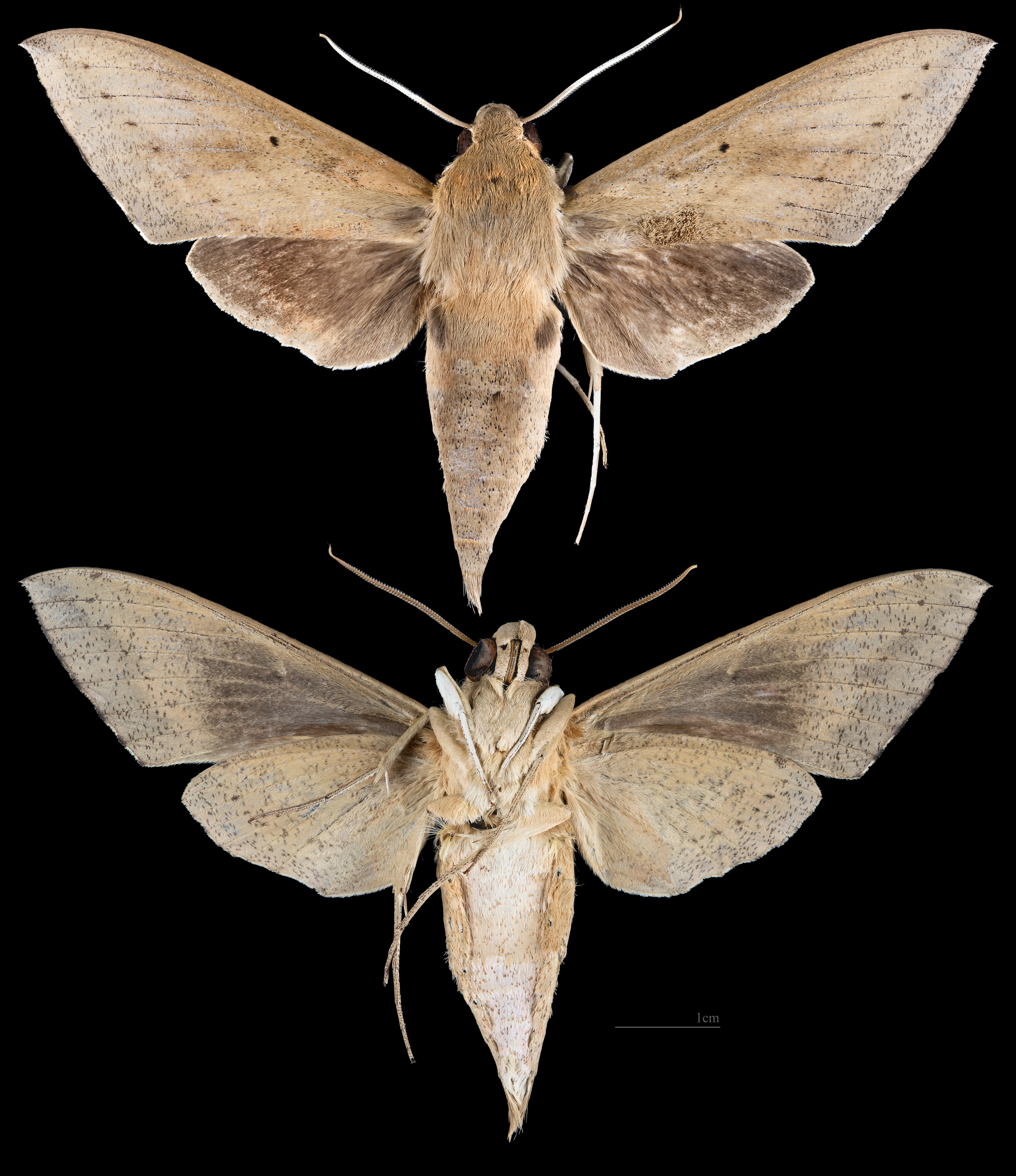
Theretra tryoni

== Ecology ==
=== Pollination ===
Several species of the genus Theretra, namely Theretra japonica and Theretra nessus, have been reported to pollinate the orchid species Vanda falcata.
