= Theretra floresica =

Scientific classification
- Kingdom: Animalia
- Phylum: Arthropoda
- Class: Insecta
- Order: Lepidoptera
- Family: Sphingidae
- Genus: Theretra
- Species: T. floresica

Binomial name
- Theretra floresica Eitschberger, 2010

Species of moth

Theretra floresica is a moth of the family Sphingidae. It is known from Flores, part of the eastern Lesser Sunda Islands of Indonesia.
