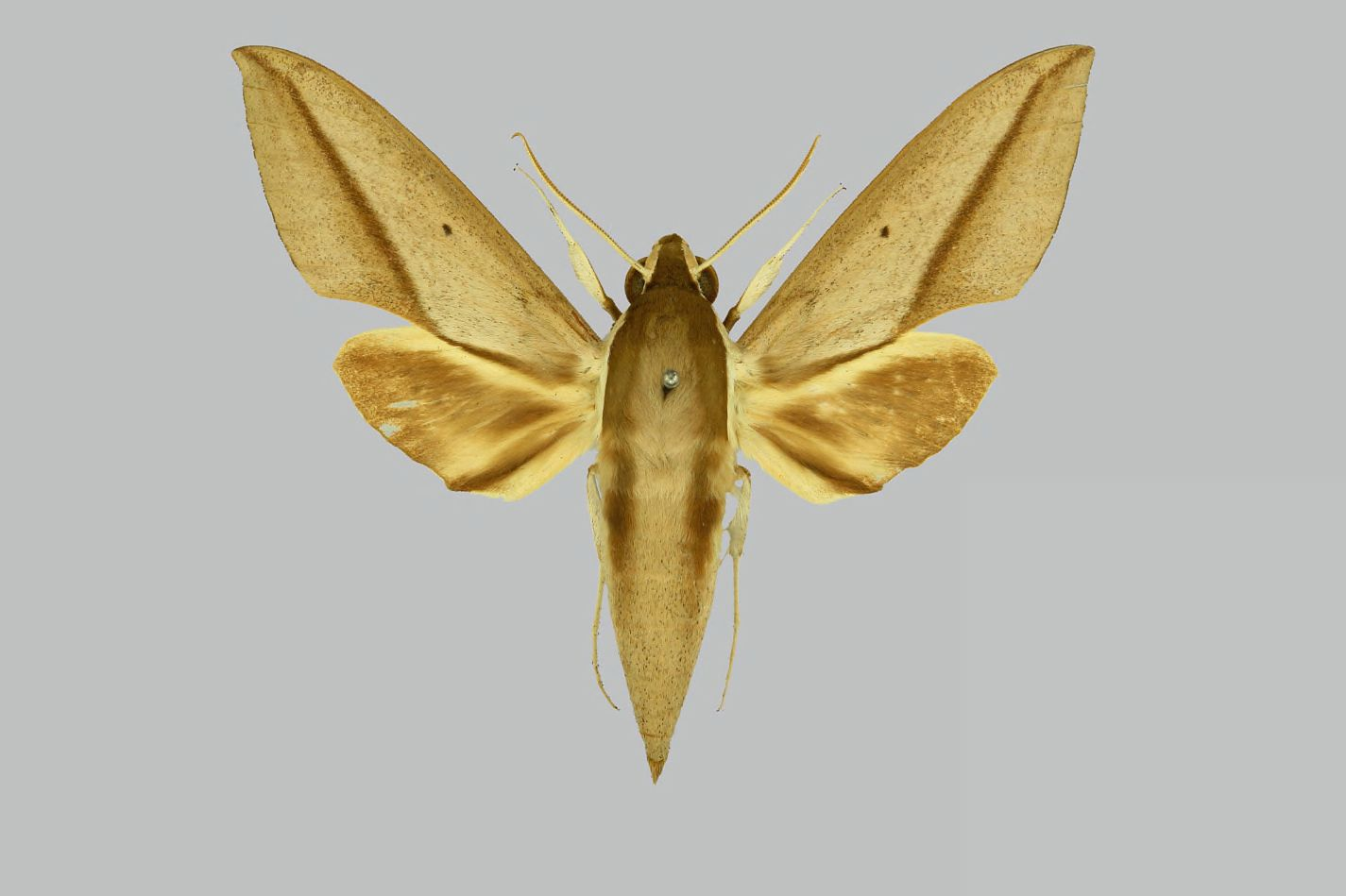

Scientific classification
- Kingdom: Animalia
- Phylum: Arthropoda
- Class: Insecta
- Order: Lepidoptera
- Family: Sphingidae
- Genus: Theretra
- Species: T. muricolor

Binomial name
- Theretra muricolor Jordan, 1926

= Theretra muricolor =

Species of moth

Theretra muricolor is a moth of the family Sphingidae. It is known from Papua New Guinea.

It is very similar to Theretra queenslandi but smaller and the forewing ground colour is pale grey. The forewing upperside is as in Theretra queenslandi, but the ground colour is pale silvery-grey. Consequently, the dark discal spot is much more conspicuous. The hindwing upperside is also as in Theretra queenslandi, but the paler marginal area is broader.
