= Theretra lombokensis =

Scientific classification
- Kingdom: Animalia
- Phylum: Arthropoda
- Class: Insecta
- Order: Lepidoptera
- Family: Sphingidae
- Genus: Theretra
- Species: T. lombokensis

Binomial name
- Theretra lombokensis Eitschberger, 2010

Species of moth

Theretra lombokensis is a moth of the family Sphingidae. It is known from Lombok in Indonesia.
