= Theretra molops =

Scientific classification
- Kingdom: Animalia
- Phylum: Arthropoda
- Class: Insecta
- Order: Lepidoptera
- Family: Sphingidae
- Genus: Theretra
- Species: T. molops

Binomial name
- Theretra molops Jordan, 1926

Species of moth

Theretra molops is a moth of the family Sphingidae. It is known from Papua New Guinea.

It is intermediate in appearance between Theretra clotho celata and Theretra queenslandi. The abdomen has a pair of basal olive-brown lateral patches that are continued posteriorly as indistinct bands, gradually fading. The forewing upperside is similar to Theretra clotho celata but the fourth postmedian line is slightly broader and has a slightly more diffuse outer edge. It is not as broad as in Theretra queenslandi.
