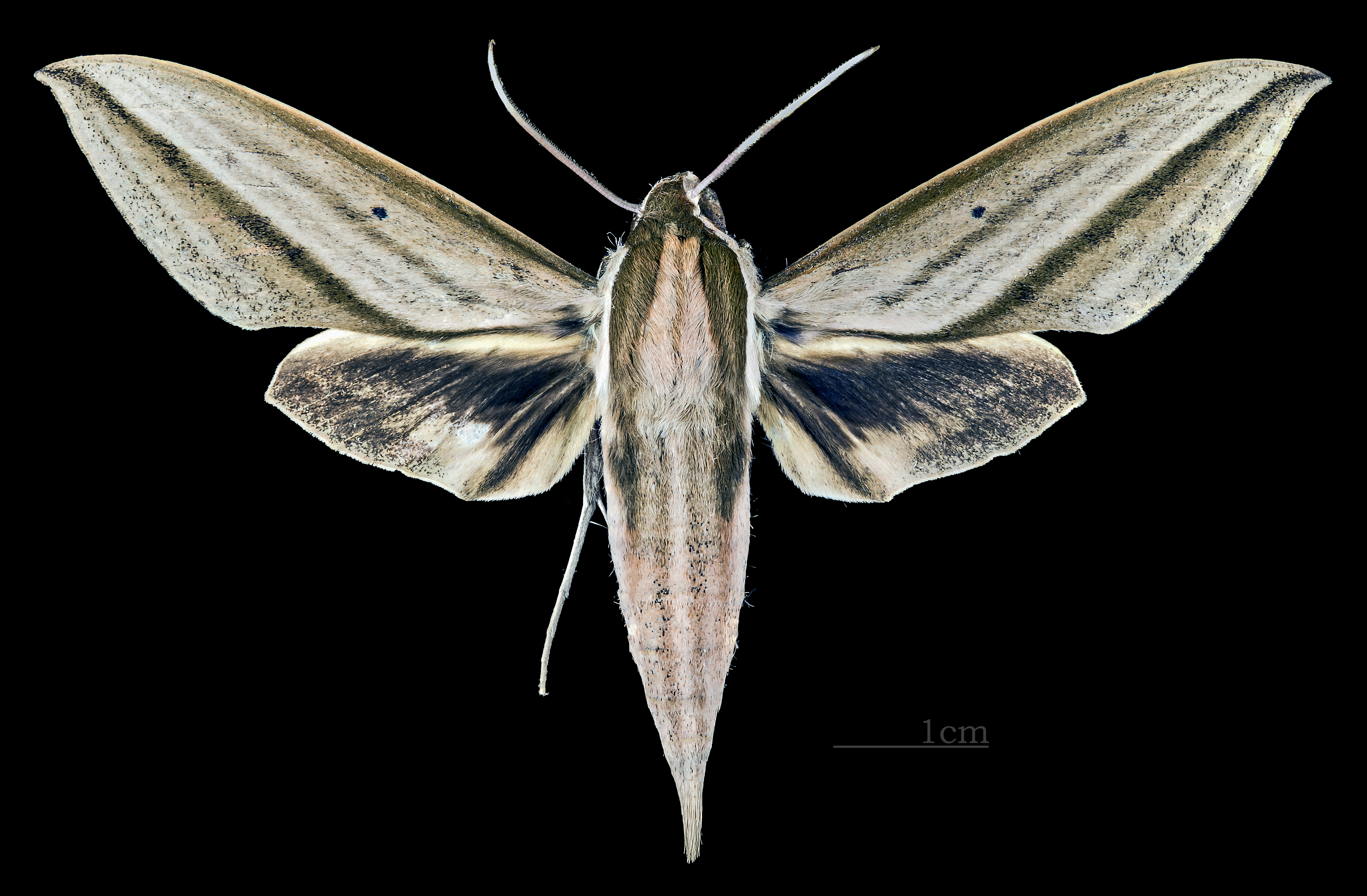
- Theretra radiosa Dorsal MHNT
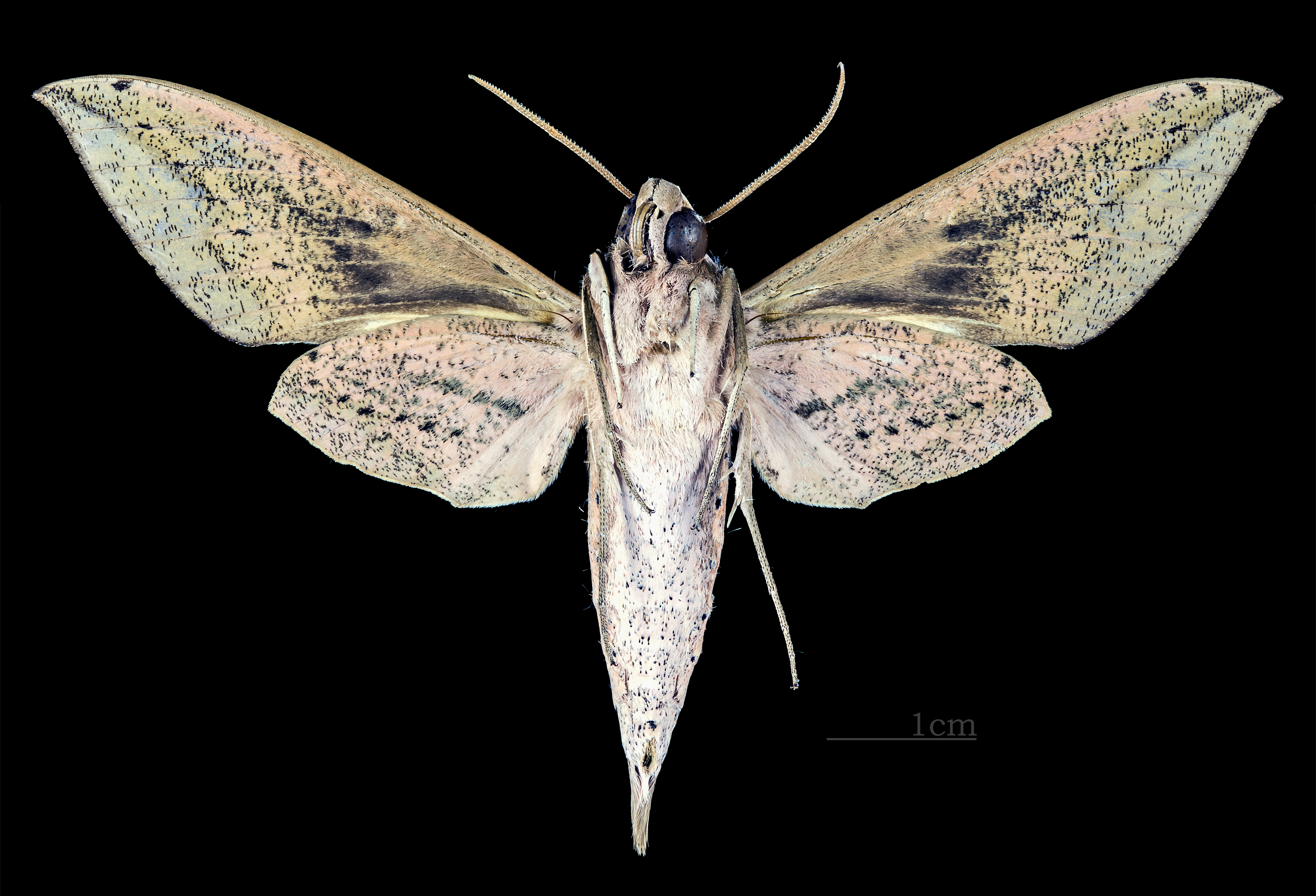
- Theretra radiosa Ventral MHNT

Scientific classification
- Kingdom: Animalia
- Phylum: Arthropoda
- Clade: Pancrustacea
- Class: Insecta
- Order: Lepidoptera
- Family: Sphingidae
- Genus: Theretra
- Species: T. radiosa

Binomial name
- Theretra radiosa Rothschild & Jordan, 1916

= Theretra radiosa =

Species of moth

Theretra radiosa is a moth of the family Sphingidae.

== Distribution ==
It is known from Papua New Guinea and Queensland.
