= Theretra improvisa =

Scientific classification
- Kingdom: Animalia
- Phylum: Arthropoda
- Class: Insecta
- Order: Lepidoptera
- Family: Sphingidae
- Genus: Theretra
- Species: T. improvisa

Binomial name
- Theretra improvisa Darge, 2006

Species of moth

Theretra improvisa is a moth of the family Sphingidae. It is known from Bioko.
