= Theretra timorensis =

Scientific classification
- Kingdom: Animalia
- Phylum: Arthropoda
- Class: Insecta
- Order: Lepidoptera
- Family: Sphingidae
- Genus: Theretra
- Species: T. timorensis

Binomial name
- Theretra timorensis Eitschberger, 2010

Species of moth

Theretra timorensis is a moth of the family Sphingidae. It is known from Timor in Indonesia.
