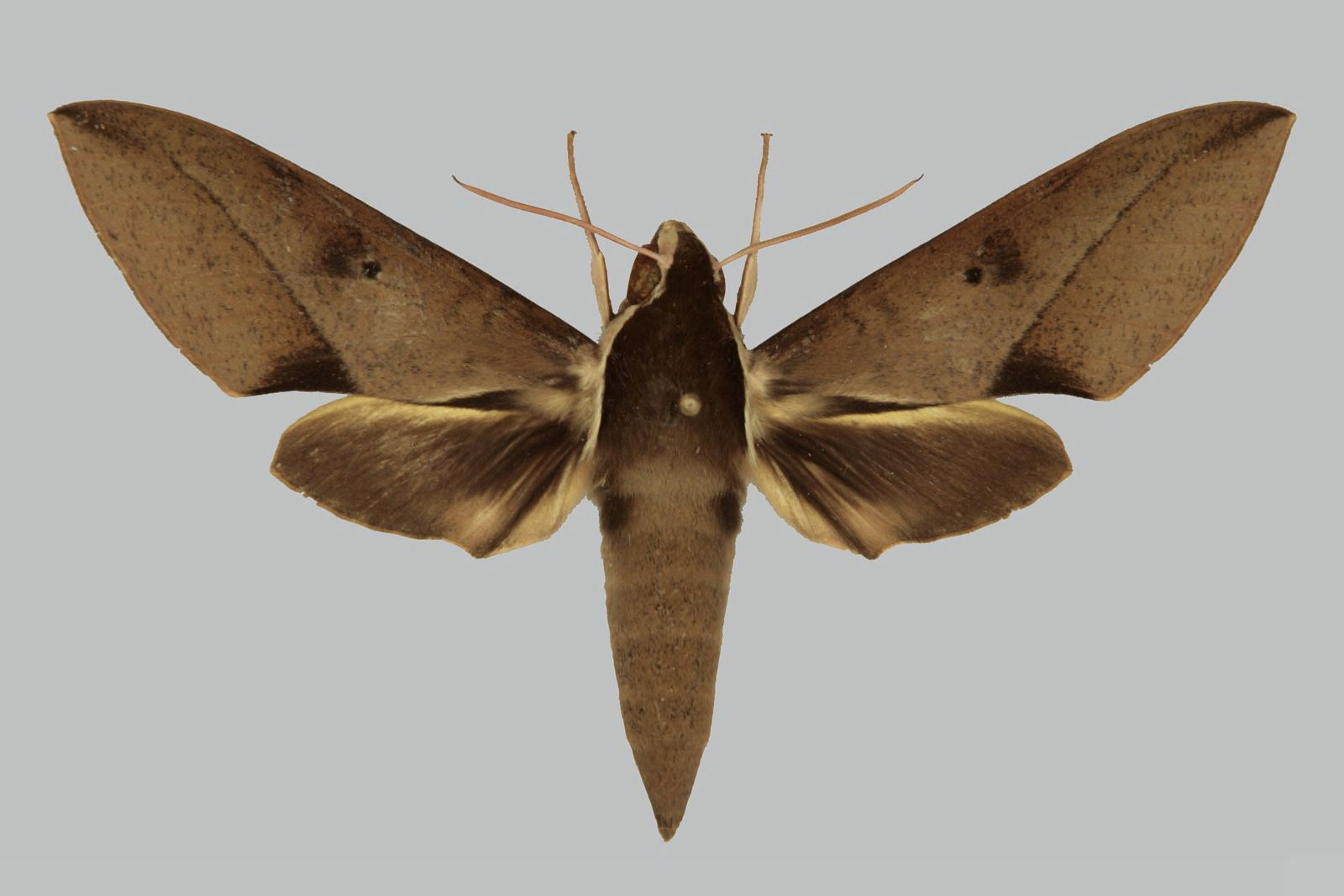

Scientific classification
- Kingdom: Animalia
- Phylum: Arthropoda
- Clade: Pancrustacea
- Class: Insecta
- Order: Lepidoptera
- Family: Sphingidae
- Genus: Theretra
- Species: T. natashae

Binomial name
- Theretra natashae Cadiou, 1995

= Theretra natashae =

Species of moth

Theretra natashae is a moth of the family Sphingidae. It is found in Indonesia.

== Subspecies ==
- Theretra natashae natashae
- Theretra natashae paukstadtorum Eitschberger, 2000 (Lombok)
