= Theretra tabubilensis =

Scientific classification
- Kingdom: Animalia
- Phylum: Arthropoda
- Class: Insecta
- Order: Lepidoptera
- Family: Sphingidae
- Genus: Theretra
- Species: T. tabubilensis

Binomial name
- Theretra tabubilensis Lachlan, 2009

Species of moth

Theretra tabubilensis is a moth of the family Sphingidae first described by Robert B. Lachlan in 2009. It is known from New Guinea.

The length of the forewings is 32.5–38.7 mm for males and 34.2–40.7 for females. It is similar to Theretra indistincta papuensis but smaller, the forewing upperside is lighter with different colour tones on either side of the fifth postmedian line, which is continuous and the diffuse dark patch distal to the discal spot does not reach the fifth postmedian line.
