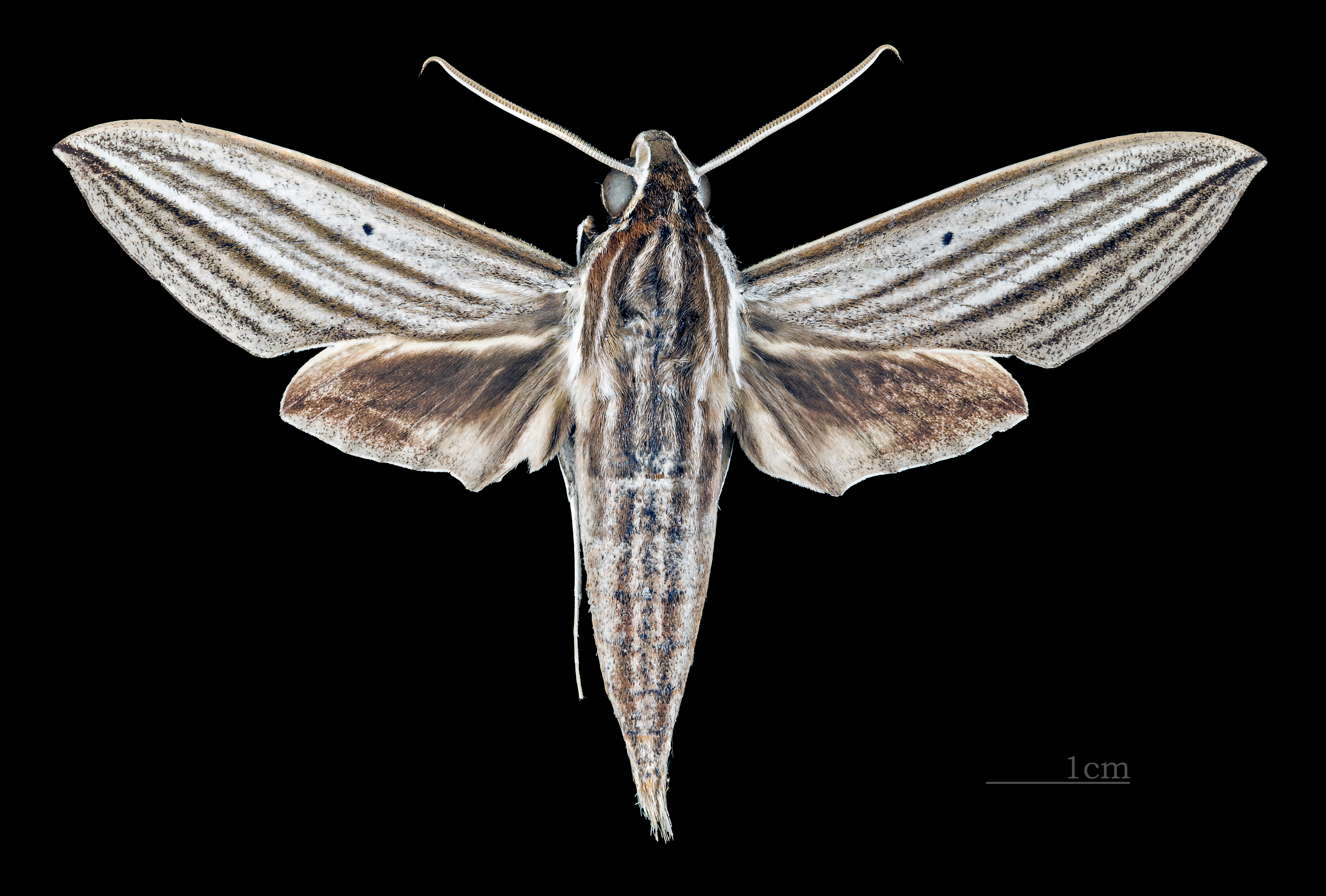
- Theretra polistratus Dorsal MHNT
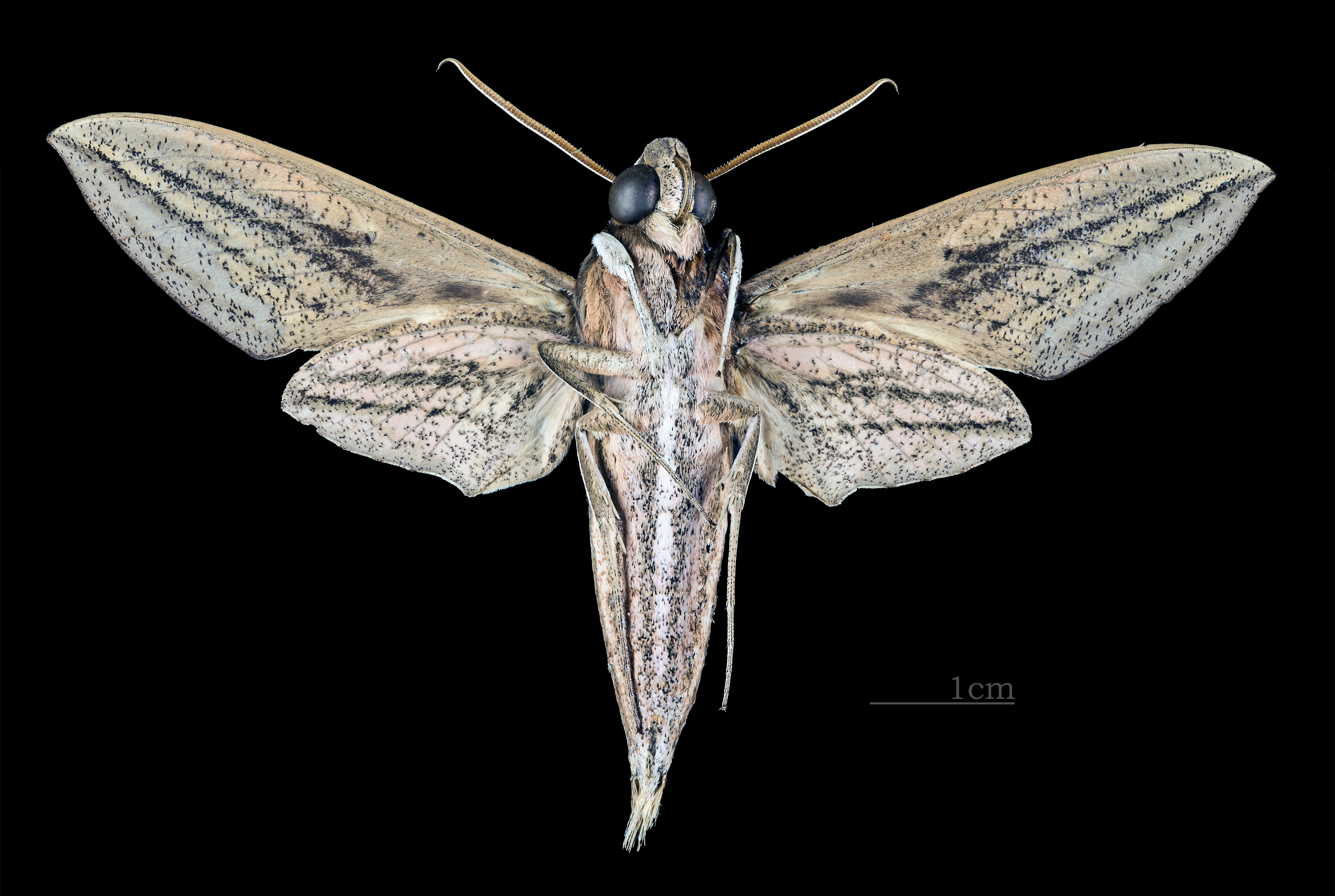
- Theretra polistratus ventral MHNT

Scientific classification
- Kingdom: Animalia
- Phylum: Arthropoda
- Class: Insecta
- Order: Lepidoptera
- Family: Sphingidae
- Genus: Theretra
- Species: T. polistratus

Binomial name
- Theretra polistratus Rothschild, 1904

= Theretra polistratus =

Species of moth

Theretra polistratus is a moth of the family Sphingidae.

== Distribution ==
It is known from Papua New Guinea.

== Description ==
It is an unmistakable species, characterized by three continuous dark green dorsal lines extending from the anterior edge of the mesothorax to the tip of the abdomen. The upperside of the body has a narrow dorsal line and a pair of somewhat broader subdorsal lines running from the mesothorax to the tip of abdomen. The forewing upperside ground colour is silver-grey with a dark green oblique antemedian line and six dark green postmedian lines.
