= Theretra papuensis =

Scientific classification
- Kingdom: Animalia
- Phylum: Arthropoda
- Class: Insecta
- Order: Lepidoptera
- Family: Sphingidae
- Genus: Theretra
- Species: T. papuensis

Binomial name
- Theretra papuensis Eitschberger, 2009

Species of moth

Theretra papuensis is a moth of the family Sphingidae. It is known from Pantar in New Guinea.
