= Theretra arfakmontensis =

Scientific classification
- Kingdom: Animalia
- Phylum: Arthropoda
- Class: Insecta
- Order: Lepidoptera
- Family: Sphingidae
- Genus: Theretra
- Species: T. arfakmontensis

Binomial name
- Theretra arfakmontensis Eitschberger, 2010

Species of moth

Theretra arfakmontensis is a moth of the family Sphingidae. It is known from Irian Jaya in Indonesia.
