= Theretra gala =

Scientific classification
- Kingdom: Animalia
- Phylum: Arthropoda
- Clade: Pancrustacea
- Class: Insecta
- Order: Lepidoptera
- Family: Sphingidae
- Genus: Theretra
- Species: T. gala

Binomial name
- Theretra gala Cadiou, 1999

Species of moth

Theretra gala is a moth of the family Sphingidae. It is known from Indonesia.
