= Theretra pantarica =

Scientific classification
- Kingdom: Animalia
- Phylum: Arthropoda
- Class: Insecta
- Order: Lepidoptera
- Family: Sphingidae
- Genus: Theretra
- Species: T. pantarica

Binomial name
- Theretra pantarica Eitschberger, 2010

Species of moth

Theretra pantarica is a moth of the family Sphingidae. It is known from the island of Pantar in south-central Indonesia.
