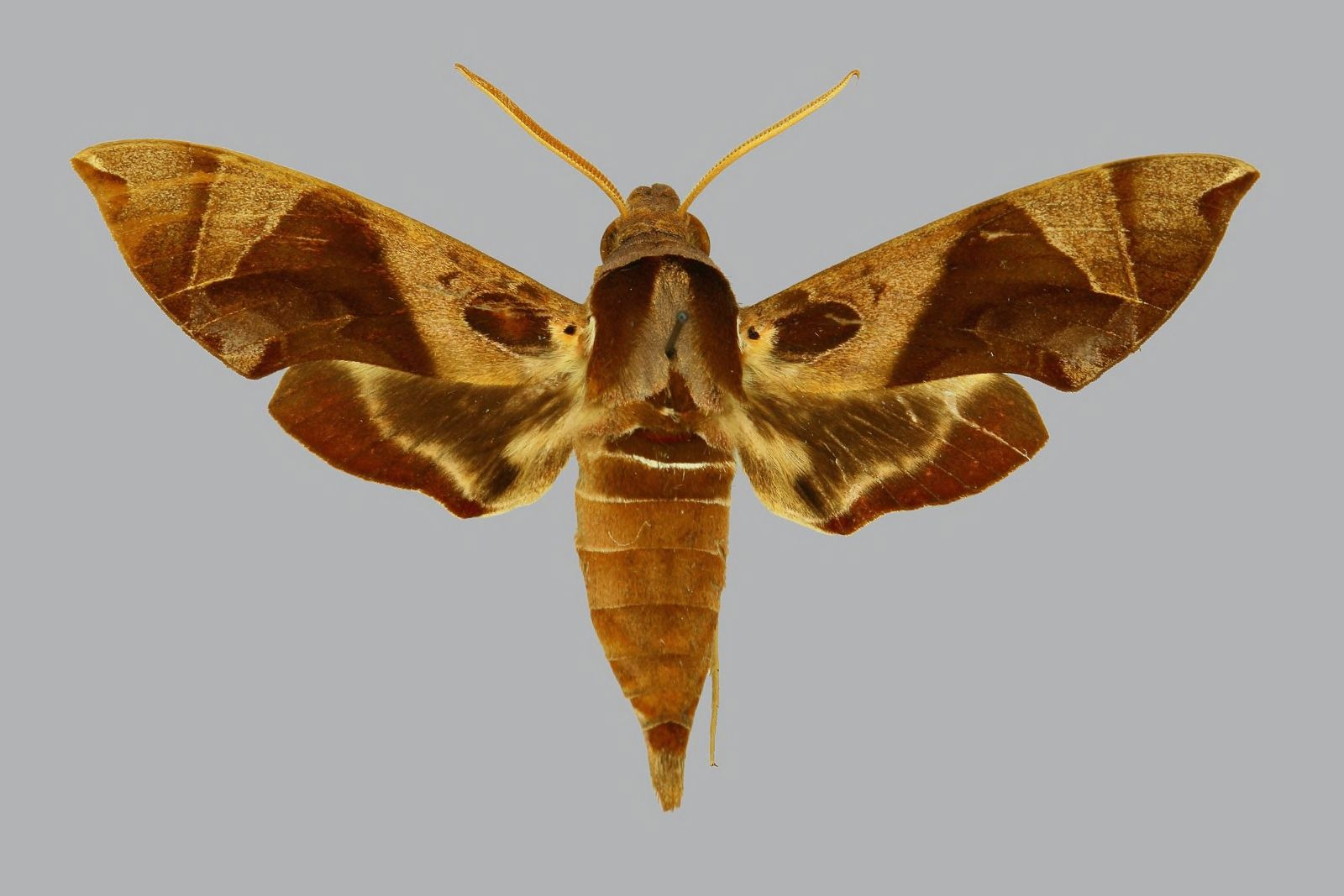
- Male

Scientific classification
- Kingdom: Animalia
- Phylum: Arthropoda
- Class: Insecta
- Order: Lepidoptera
- Family: Sphingidae
- Genus: Daphnis
- Species: D. layardii

Binomial name
- Daphnis layardii Moore, 1882

= Daphnis layardii =

Species of moth

Daphnis layardii is a moth of the family Sphingidae. It was described by Frederic Moore in 1882 and is known from Sri Lanka.

It is similar to Daphnis moorei but smaller. The forewing upperside is similar to Daphnis moorei, but the white highlighting of many of the pattern elements reduced or absent, giving a much flatter and less contrasted pattern. The antemedian line is distinct only anteriorly.

Differs from hypothous in being ruddy brown, not olive in hue; abdomen with a pale fringe to each segment. Underside with the white spots at apex of fore wing and at end of cell of each wing minute. Exp. 86millim.

— The Fauna of British India, Including Ceylon and Burma: Moths Volume I
