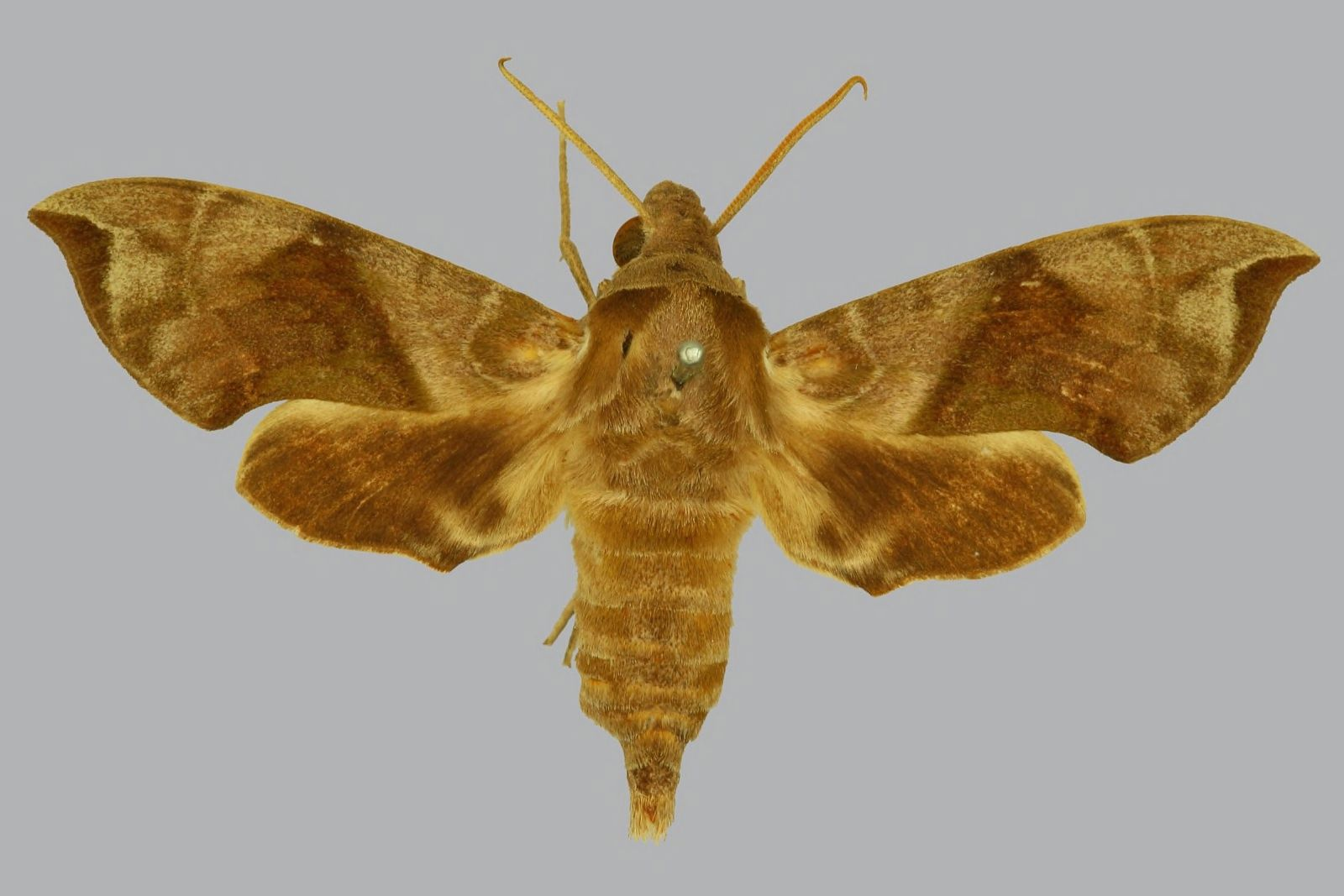

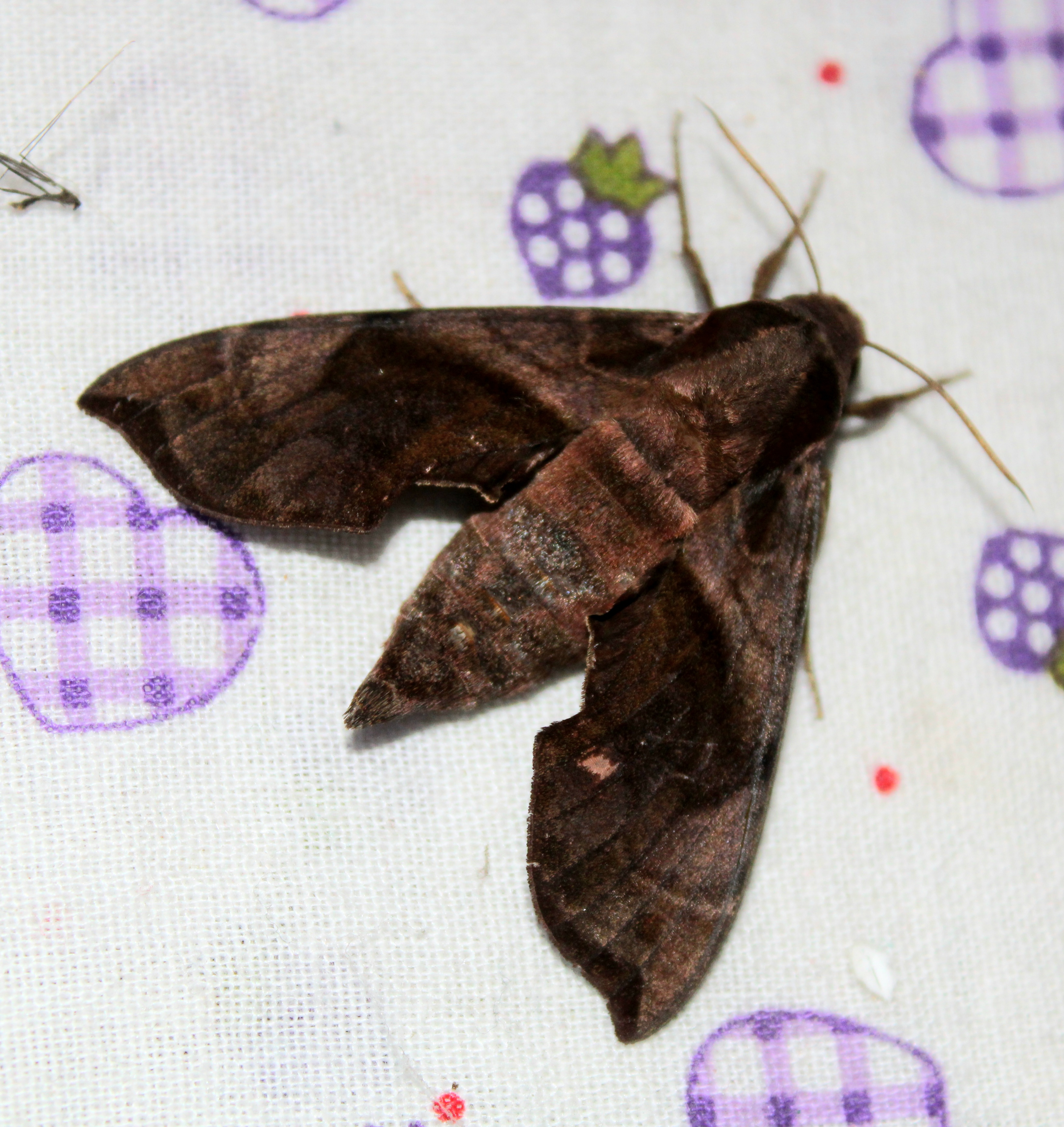

Scientific classification
- Kingdom: Animalia
- Phylum: Arthropoda
- Class: Insecta
- Order: Lepidoptera
- Family: Sphingidae
- Genus: Daphnis
- Species: D. minima

Binomial name
- Daphnis minima Butler, 1876

Synonyms
- Daphnis ernestina Moore, 1887

= Daphnis minima =

Species of moth

Daphnis minima is a moth of the family Sphingidae. It is known from Western Ghats of India and Sri Lanka.

It is similar to Daphnis placida placida but smaller and the forewing upperside median olive-green band is less oblique, wider posteriorly and narrower before the middle. It was described by Arthur Gardiner Butler in 1877 (journal date 1876 but actual publication was delayed) on the basis of a specimen collected from Uttara Kanara by S. N. Ward in the collection of Frederic Moore.
