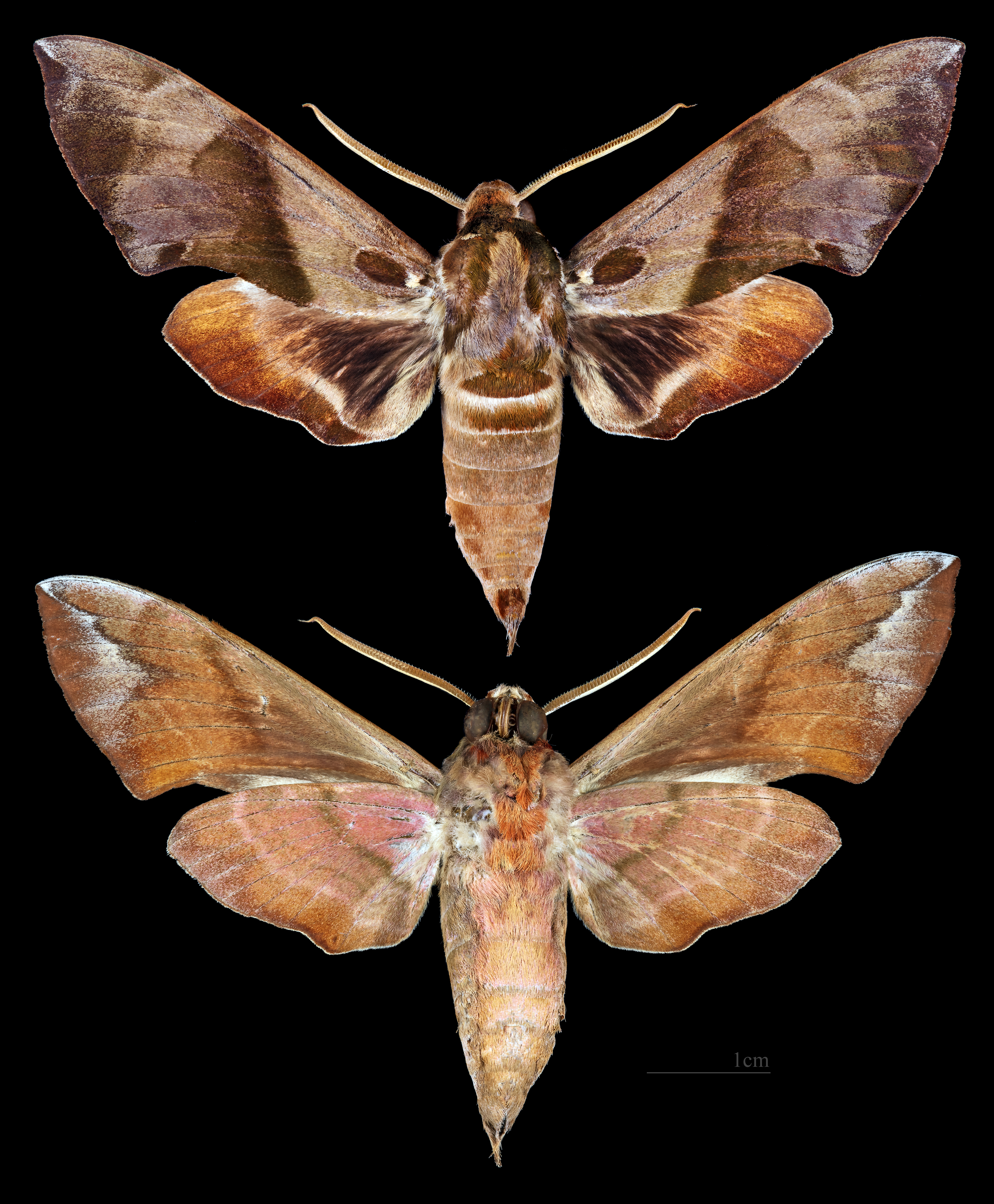

Scientific classification
- Kingdom: Animalia
- Phylum: Arthropoda
- Class: Insecta
- Order: Lepidoptera
- Family: Sphingidae
- Genus: Daphnis
- Species: D. torenia

Binomial name
- Daphnis torenia H. Druce, 1882

Synonyms
- Deilephila steffanyi Clark, 1927

= Daphnis torenia =

Species of moth

Daphnis torenia is a species of moth of the family Sphingidae first described by Herbert Druce in 1882. It is found in the Pacific, including Fiji, the New Hebrides and Hawaii.

It was considered a subspecies of Daphnis placida for some time, but was reinstated as a species. The forewing upperside is similar to Daphnis placida placida, but the proximal edge of the olive-green median area is straight, very feebly or not at all incurved on the costa and the antemedian line is barely visible.
