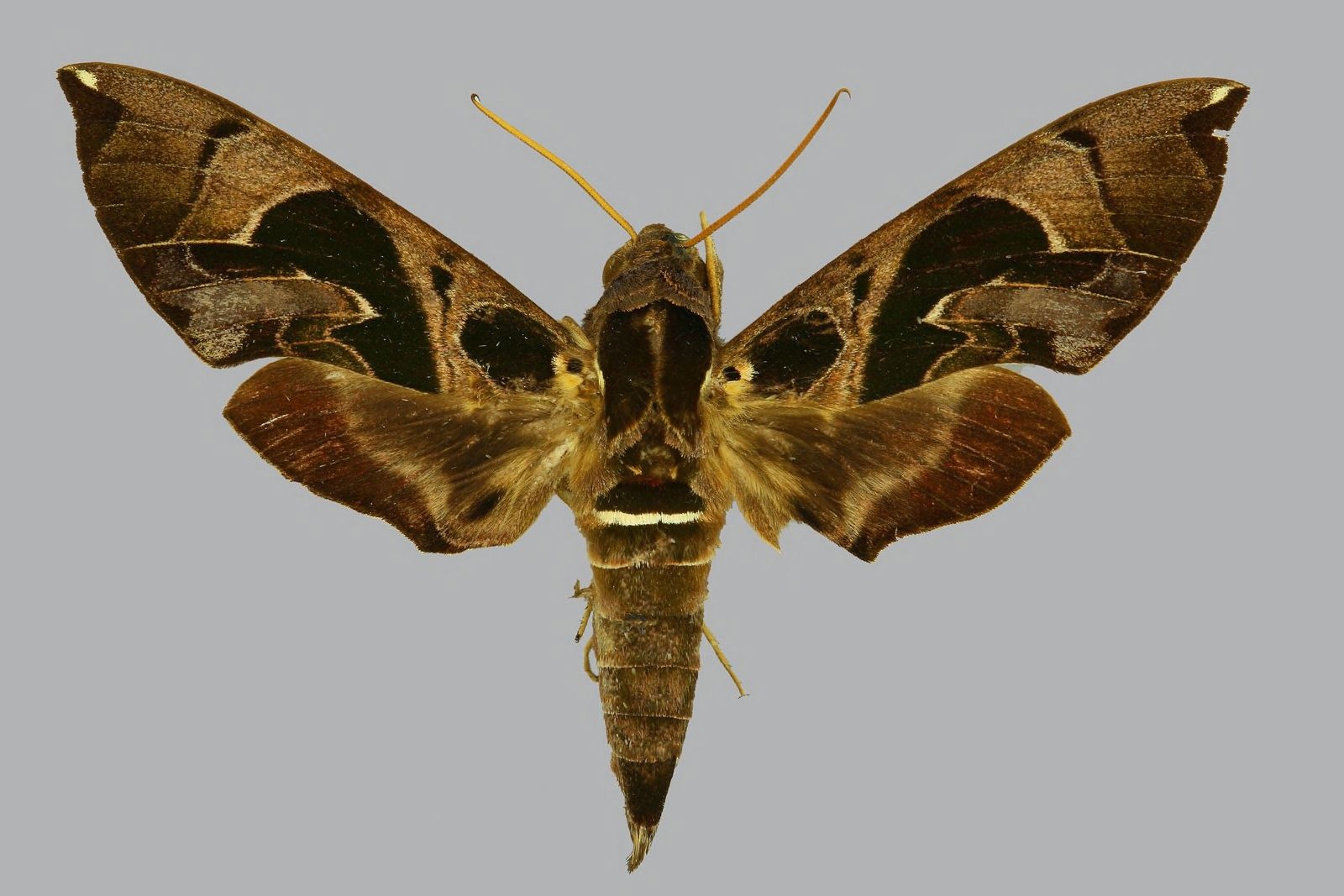
- Female

Scientific classification
- Kingdom: Animalia
- Phylum: Arthropoda
- Class: Insecta
- Order: Lepidoptera
- Family: Sphingidae
- Genus: Daphnis
- Species: D. vriesi

Binomial name
- Daphnis vriesi Hogenes & Treadaway, 1993

= Daphnis vriesi =

Species of moth

Daphnis vriesi is a moth of the family Sphingidae. It is known from the Philippines.

The length of the forewings is 35–38 mm for males and 38–42 mm for females. The forewing upperside is similar to Daphnis hayesi, but the ground colour is brown, lacking any green scaling.
