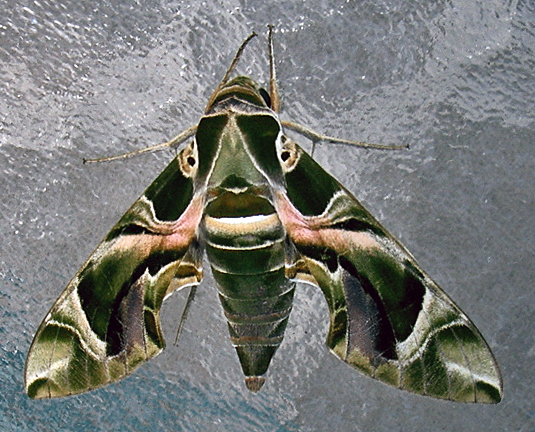
- Daphnis nerii

Scientific classification
- Domain: Eukaryota
- Kingdom: Animalia
- Phylum: Arthropoda
- Class: Insecta
- Order: Lepidoptera
- Family: Sphingidae
- Subtribe: Macroglossina
- Genus: Daphnis; Hübner, 1819

Synonyms
- Histriosphinx Varis, 1976; Regia Tutt, 1903

= Daphnis (moth) =

Genus of moths

Daphnis is a genus of moths in the family Sphingidae first described by Jacob Hübner in 1819.

== Distribution ==
Primarily Indo-Australian origin, the species are widely distributed throughout India, Africa, Europe, Borneo, Java, Sri Lanka and Mauritius. Adults are often found in Europe as immigrant individuals, that can be observed in dispersed localities.

== Species ==
- Daphnis dohertyi Rothschild, 1897
- Daphnis hayesi Cadiou, 1988
- Daphnis hypothous (Cramer, 1780)
- Daphnis layardii Moore, 1882
- Daphnis minima Butler, 1876
- Daphnis moorei W.J. Macleay, 1866
- Daphnis nerii (Linnaeus, 1758)
- Daphnis placida (Walker, 1856)
- Daphnis protrudens Felder, 1874
- Daphnis torenia Druce, 1882
- Daphnis vriesi Hogenes & Treadaway, 1993

== Gallery ==
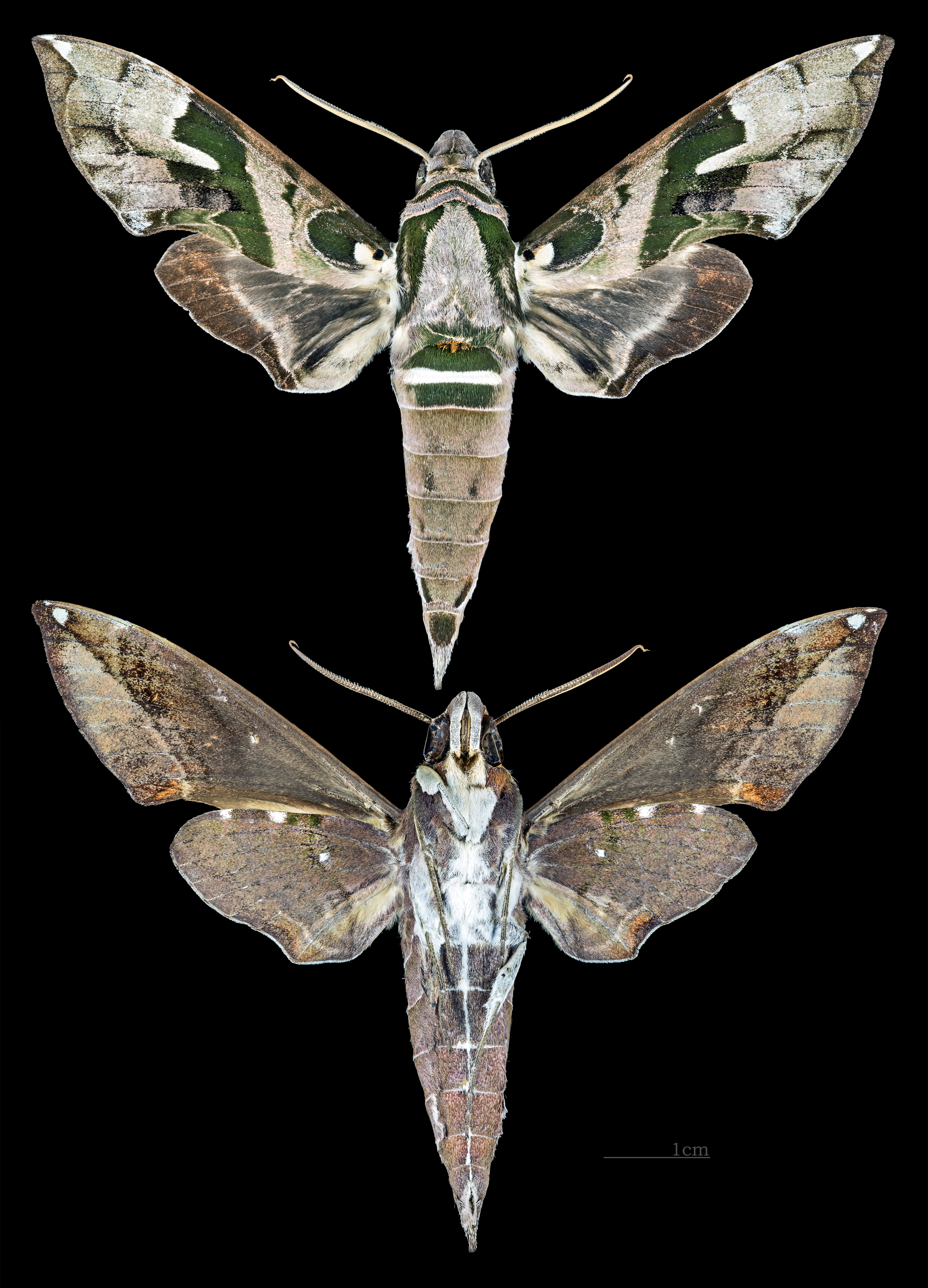
Daphnis dohertyi

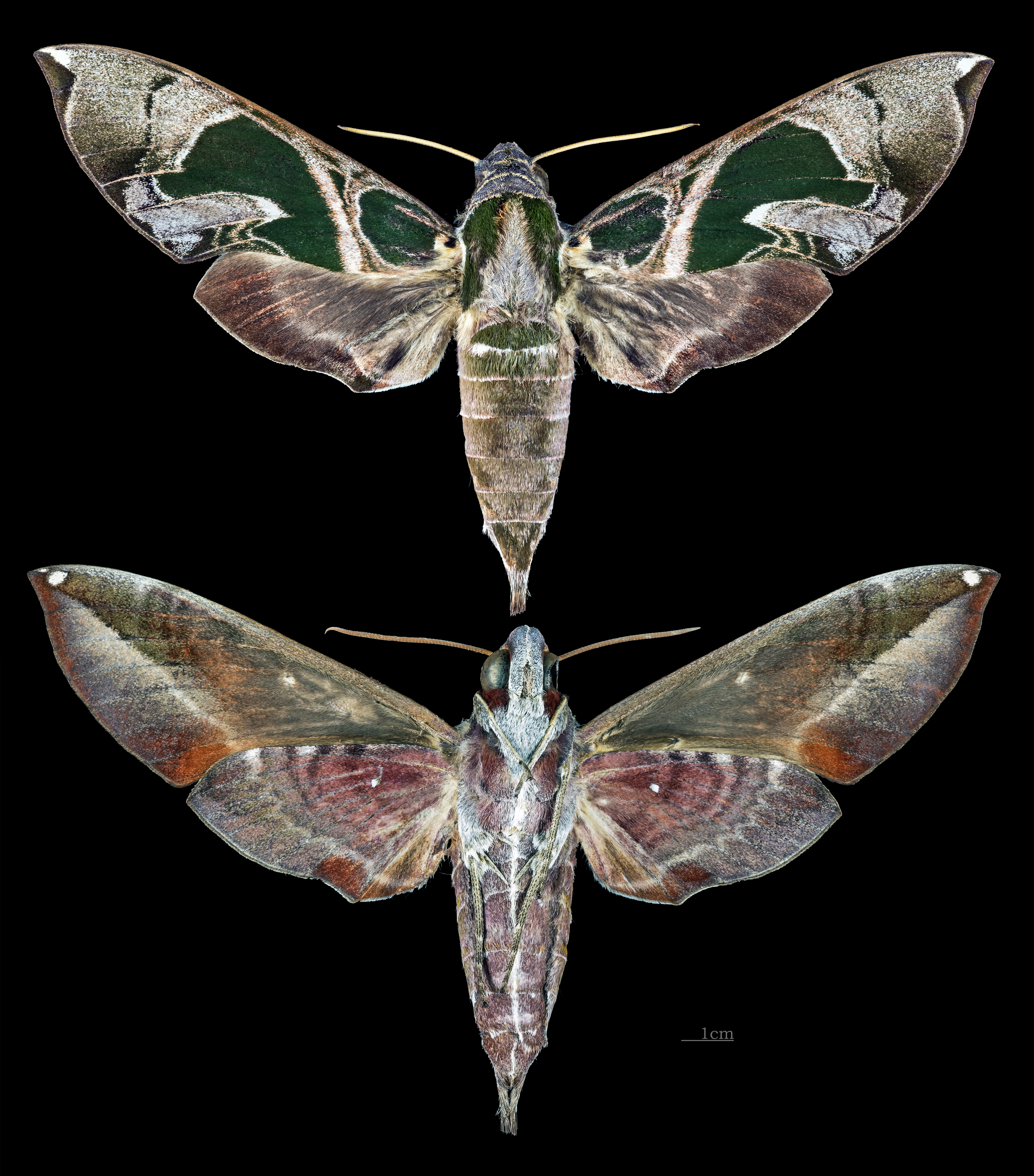
Daphnis hayesi

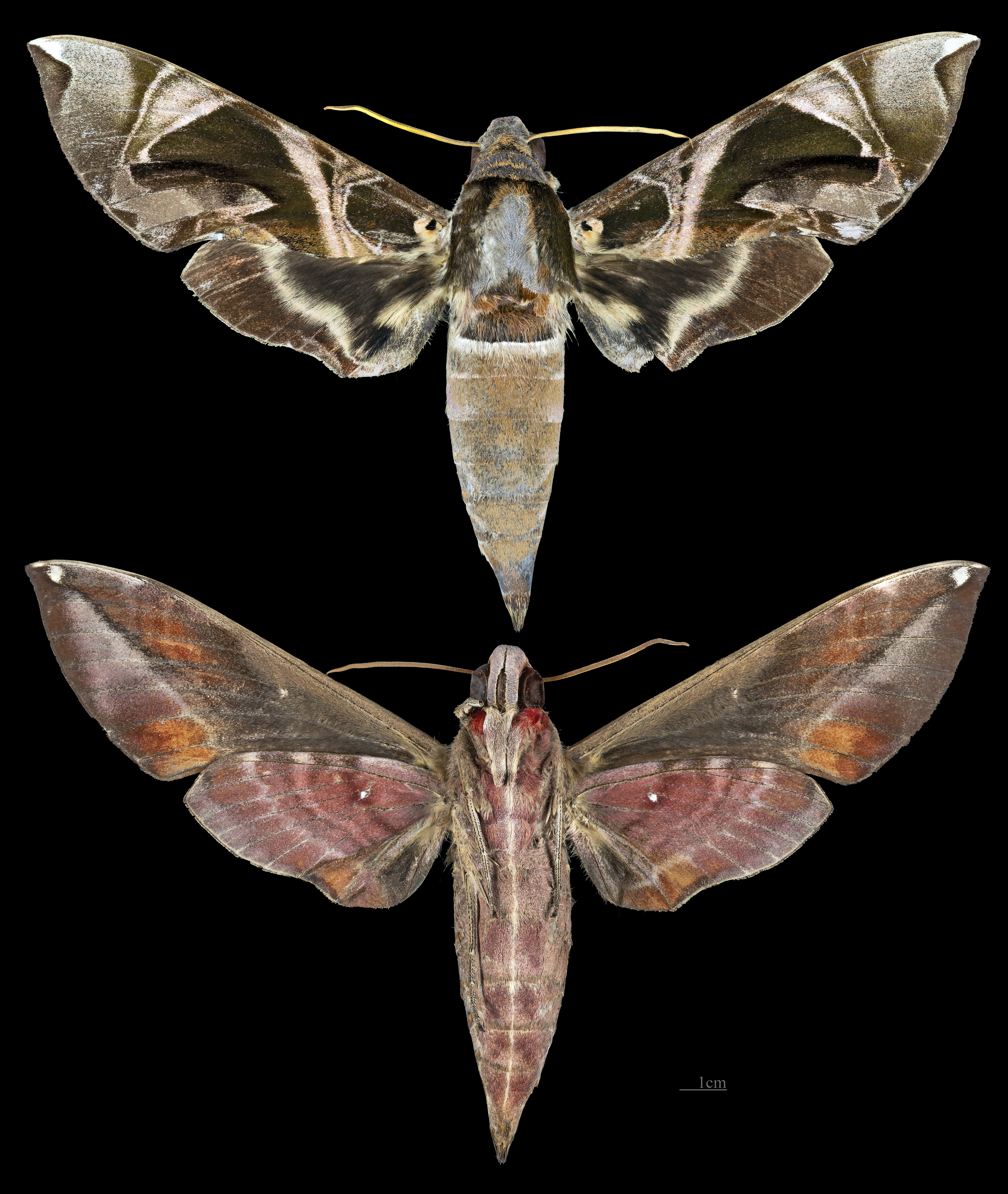
Daphnis hypothous

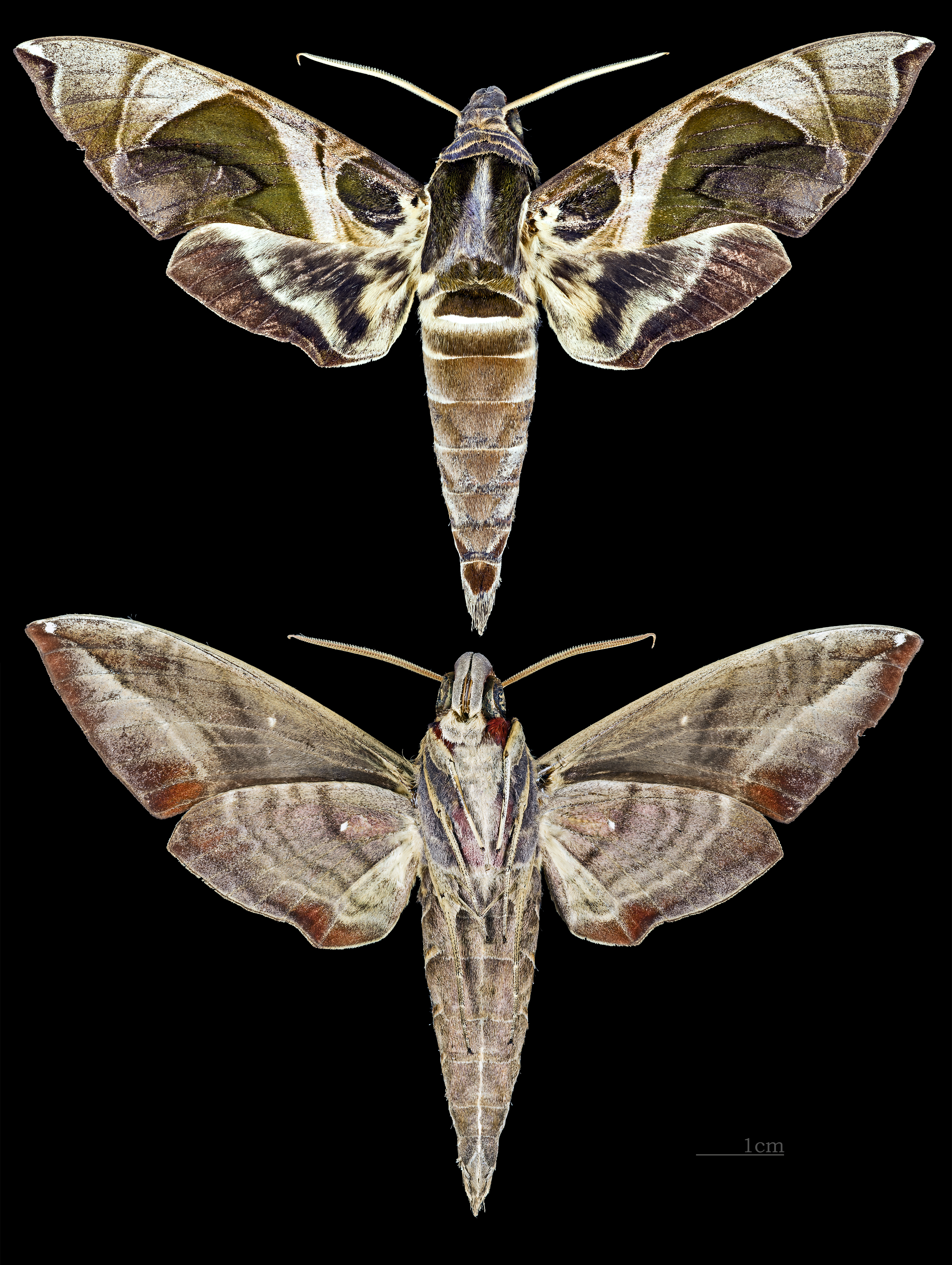
Daphnis moorei

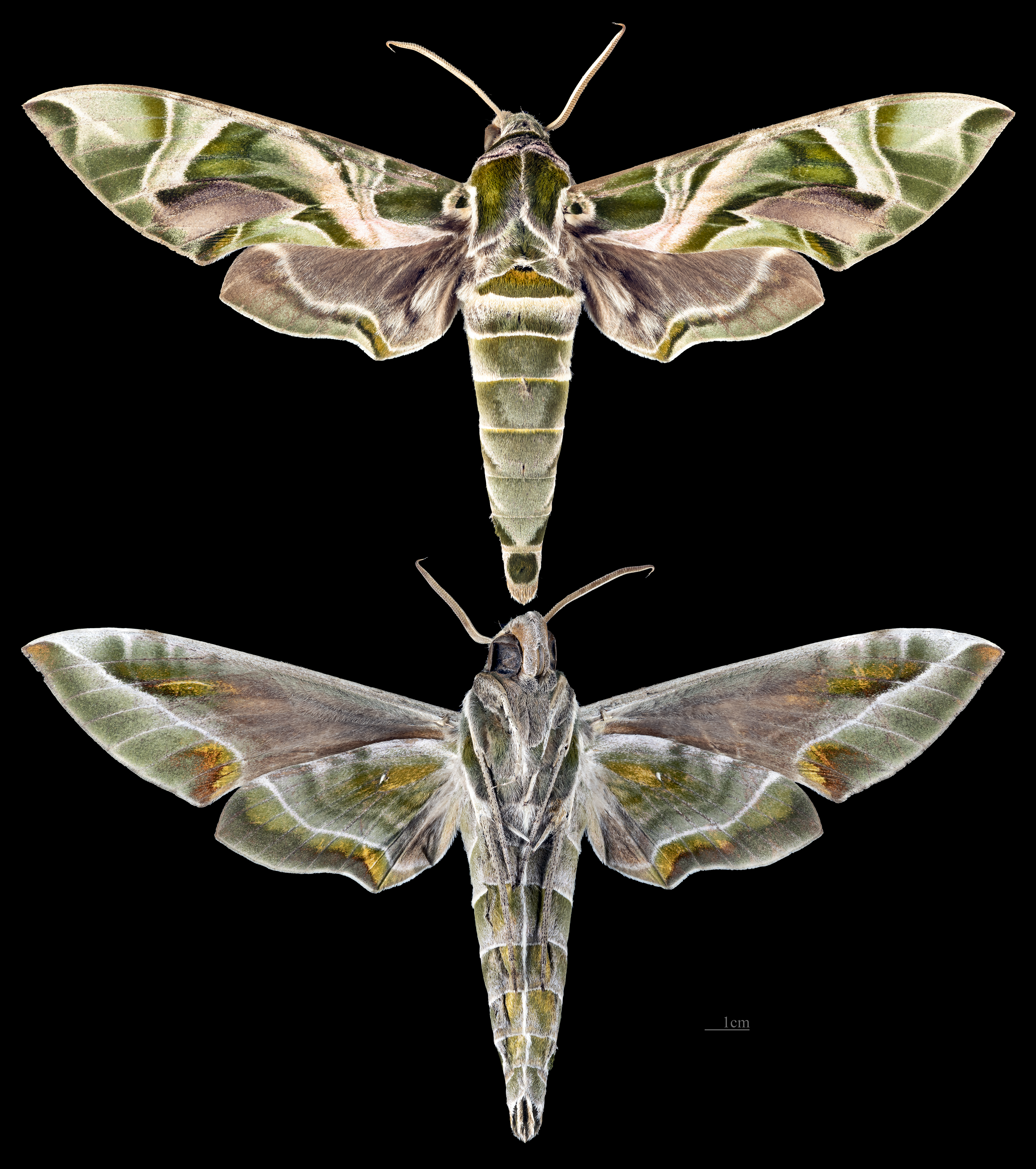
Daphnis nerii

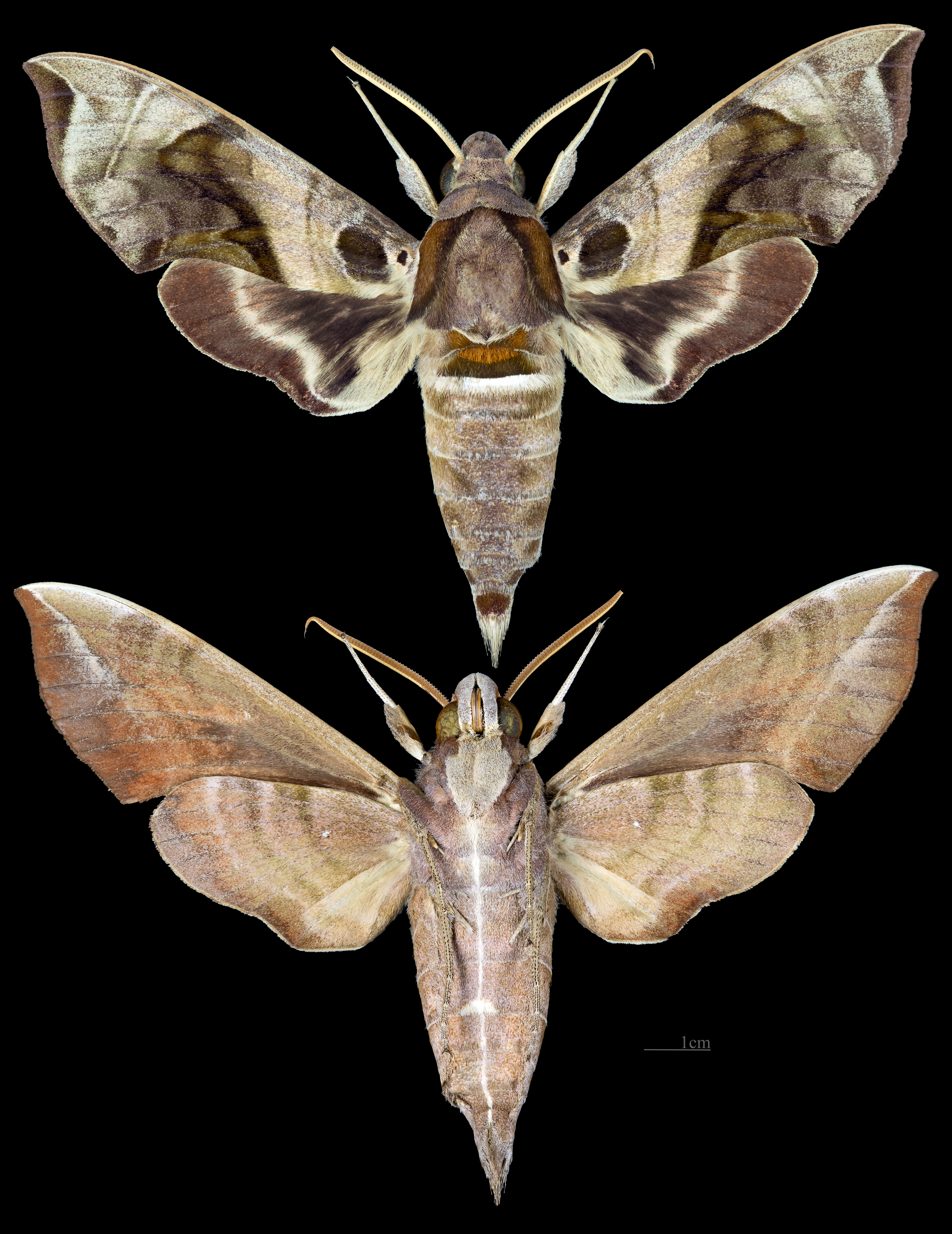
Daphnis placida

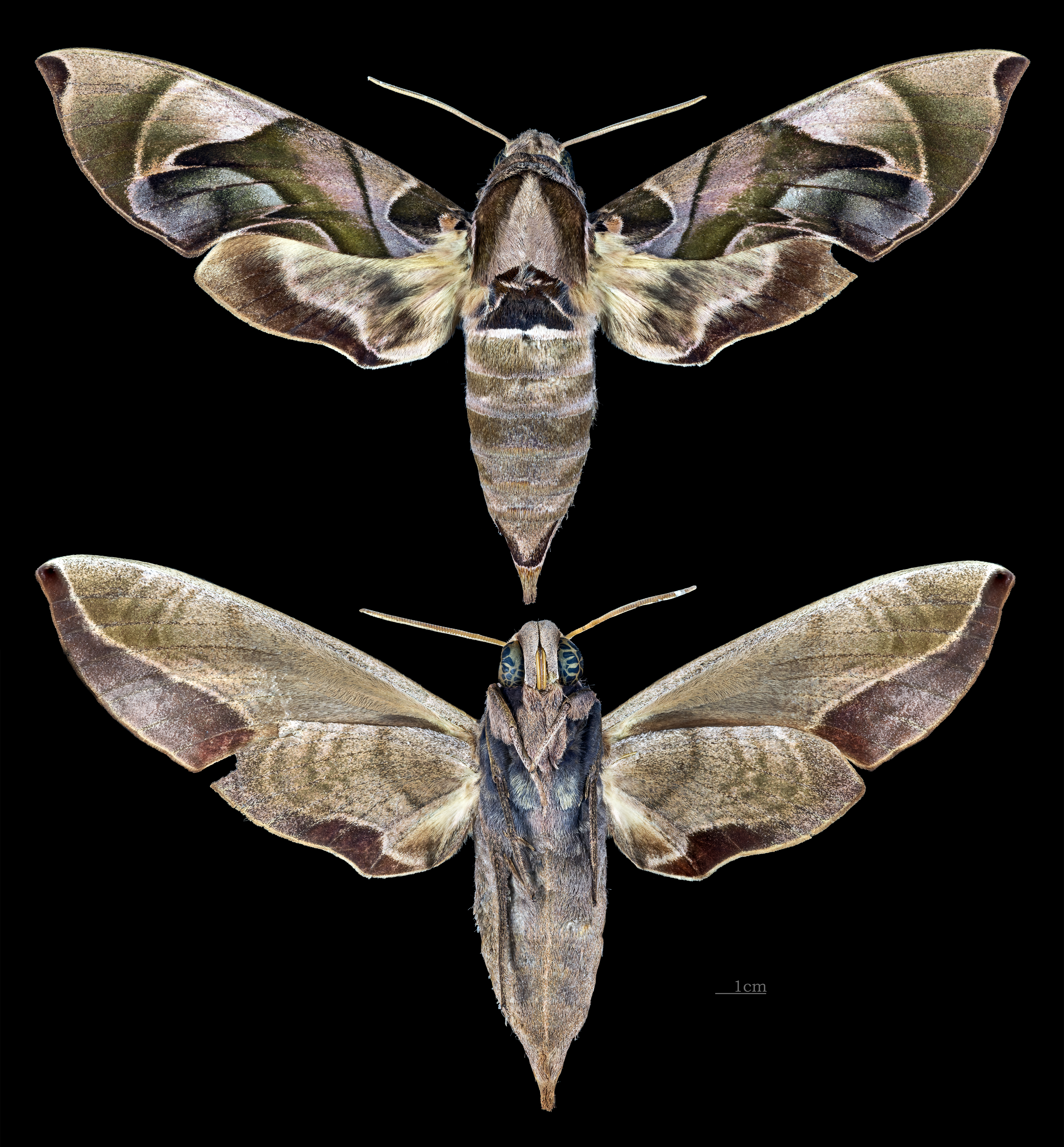
Daphnis protrudens

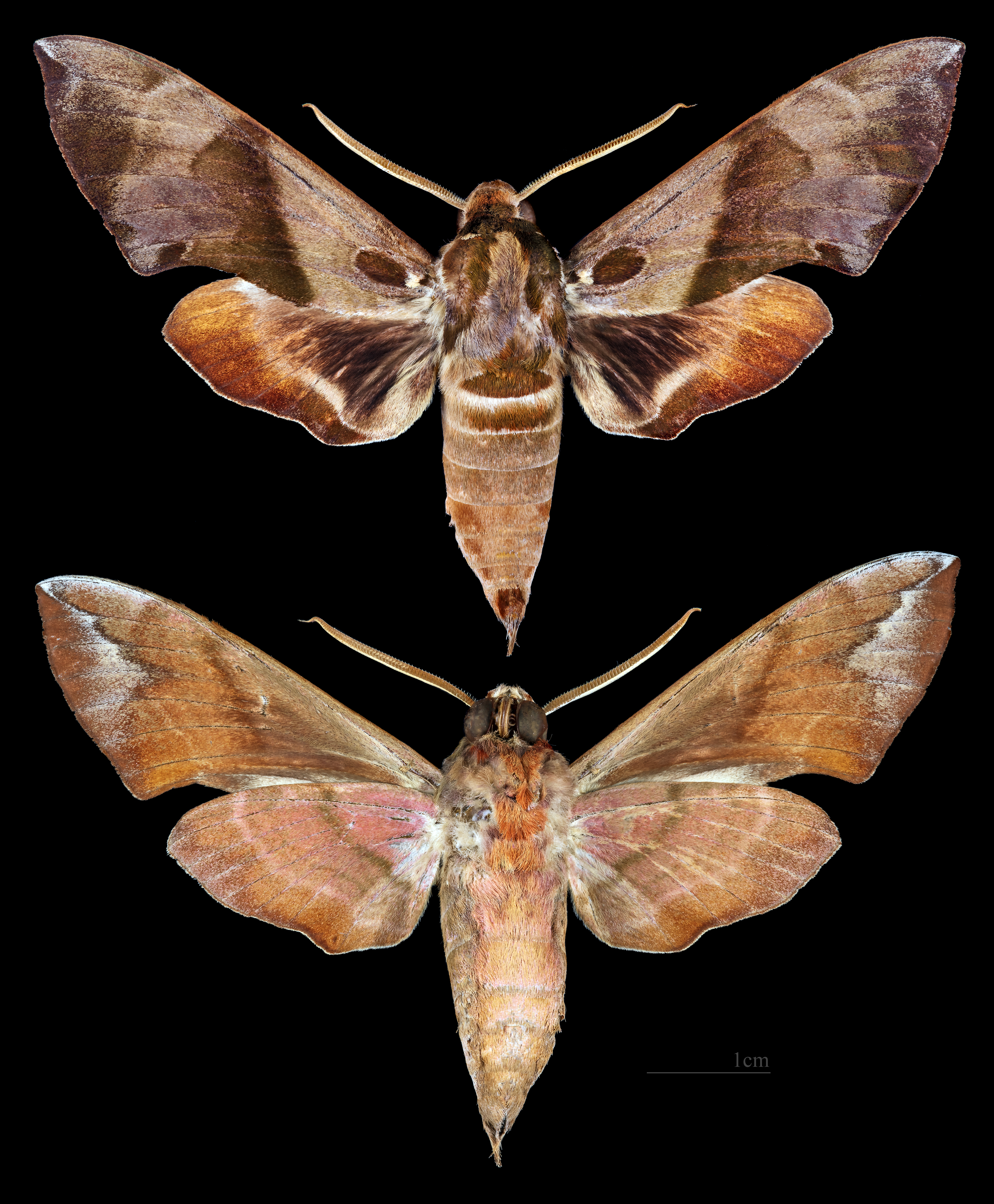
Daphnis torenia
