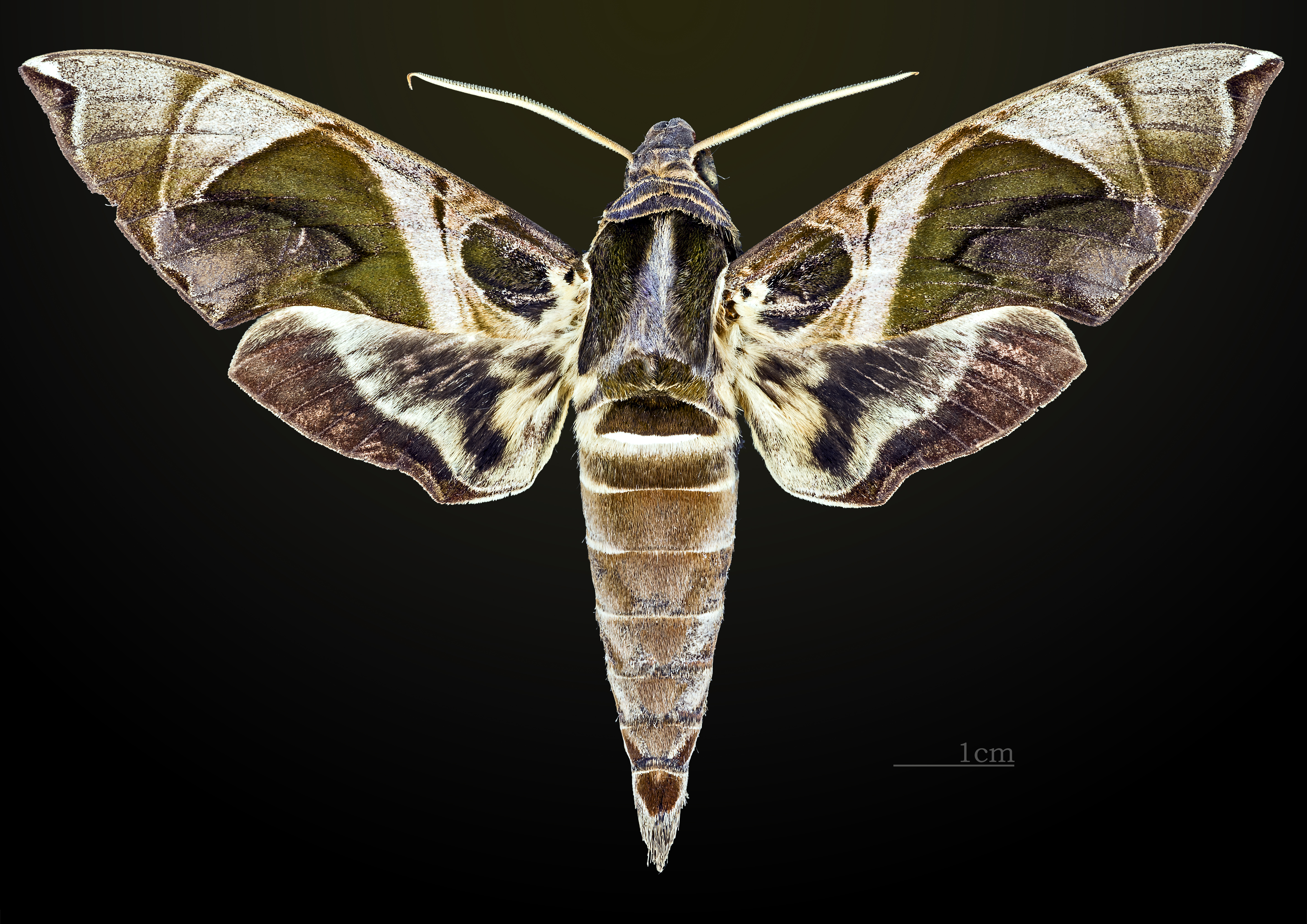
- Dorsal view
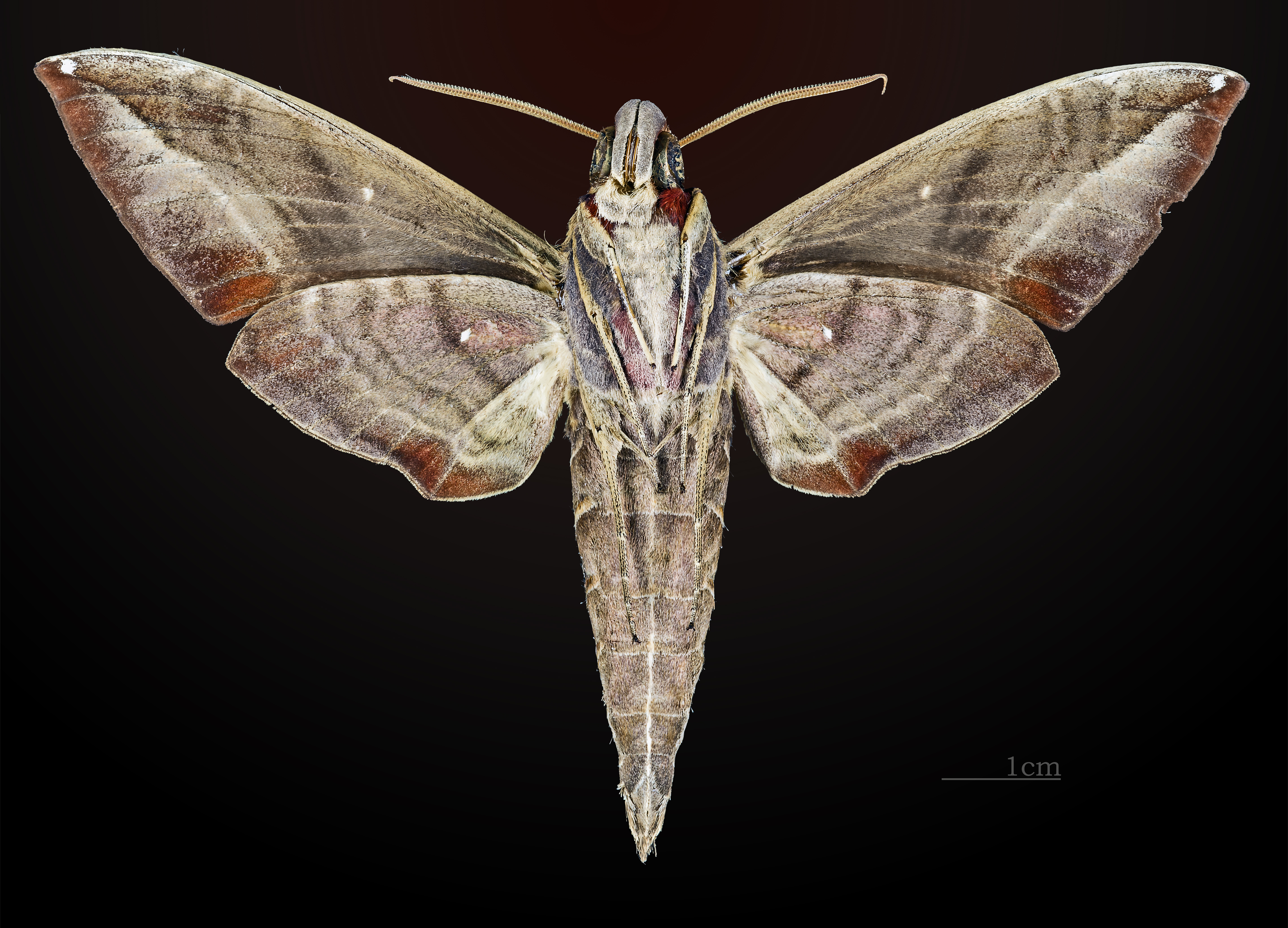
- Ventral view

Scientific classification
- Kingdom: Animalia
- Phylum: Arthropoda
- Class: Insecta
- Order: Lepidoptera
- Family: Sphingidae
- Genus: Daphnis
- Species: D. moorei

Binomial name
- Daphnis moorei (W. J. Macleay, 1866)

Synonyms
- Darapsa moorei W. J. Macleay, 1866; Daphnis pallescens Butler, 1875; Daphnis magnifica Butler, 1877; Deilephila gigantea Röber, 1921; Daphnis gloriosa Rothschild, 1894; Daphnis hypothous moorei (W. J. Macleay, 1866)

= Daphnis moorei =

Species of moth

Daphnis moorei is a moth of the family Sphingidae first described by William John Macleay in 1866. It is known from Indonesia (including the Moluccas), Papua New Guinea and the northern half of Australia.

The forewing upperside is similar to Daphnis hypothous.
