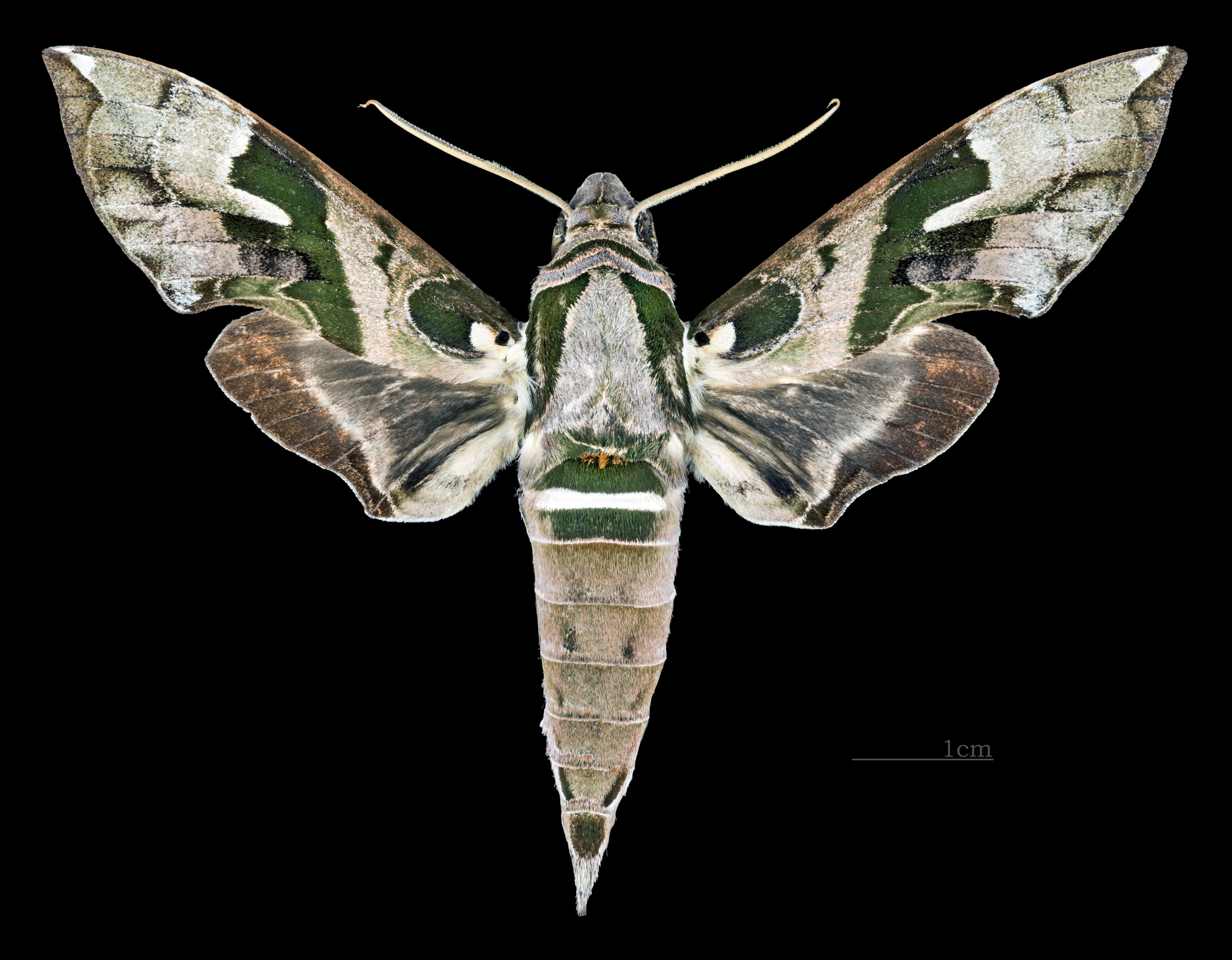
- Daphnis dohertyi Male dorsal
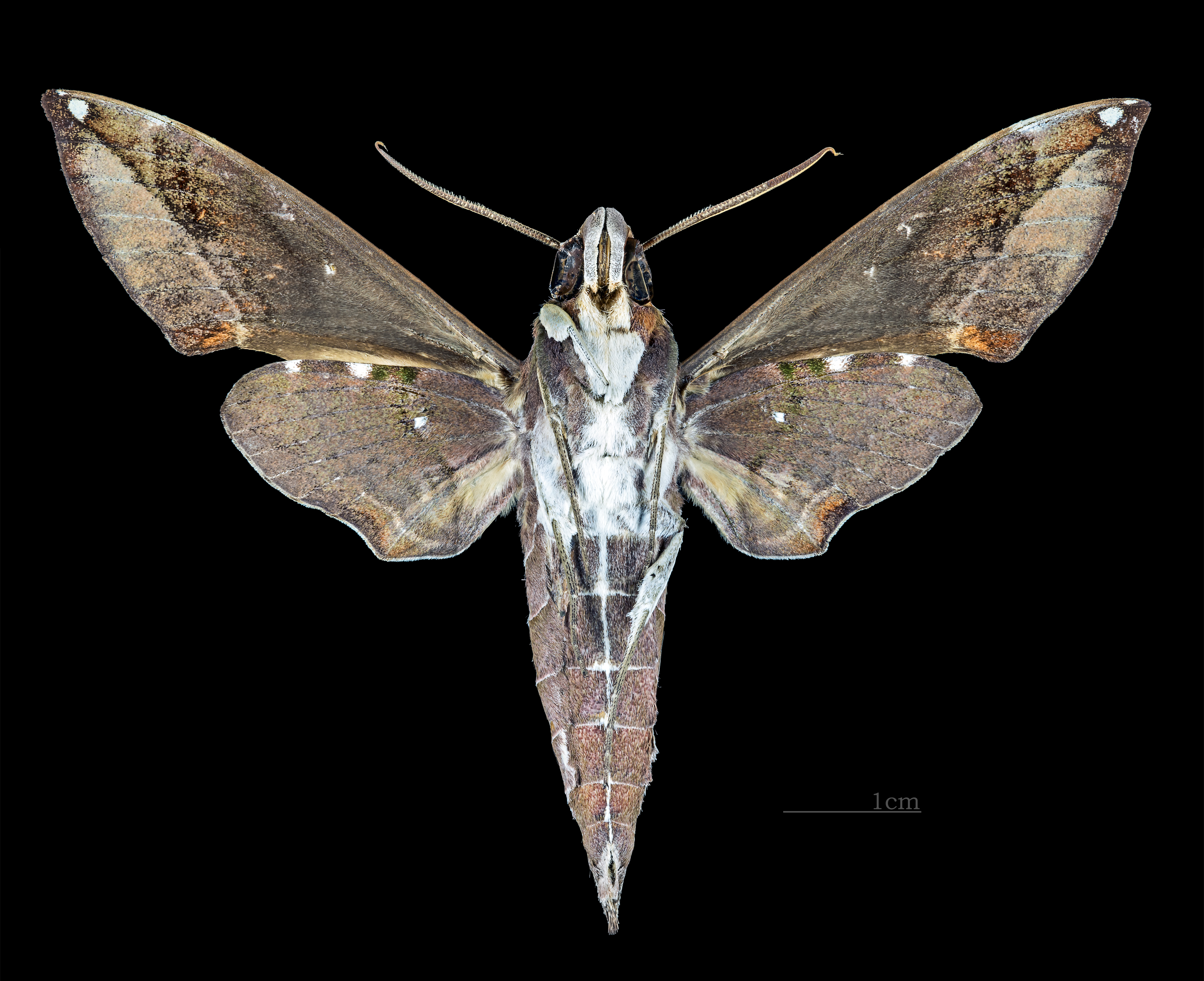
- Daphnis dohertyi Male ventral

Scientific classification
- Kingdom: Animalia
- Phylum: Arthropoda
- Class: Insecta
- Order: Lepidoptera
- Family: Sphingidae
- Genus: Daphnis
- Species: D. dohertyi

Binomial name
- Daphnis dohertyi Rothschild, 1897

Synonyms
- Deilephila dohertyi callusia Rothschild & Jordan, 1916

= Daphnis dohertyi =

Species of moth

Daphnis dohertyi is a moth of the family Sphingidae. It is found from Indonesia, New Guinea, the Philippines the Solomon Islands and Torres Strait.

The length of the forewings is 42–47 mm.

== Subspecies ==
- Daphnis dohertyi dohertyi
- Daphnis dohertyi callusia (Rothschild & Jordan, 1916) (Solomon Islands)
