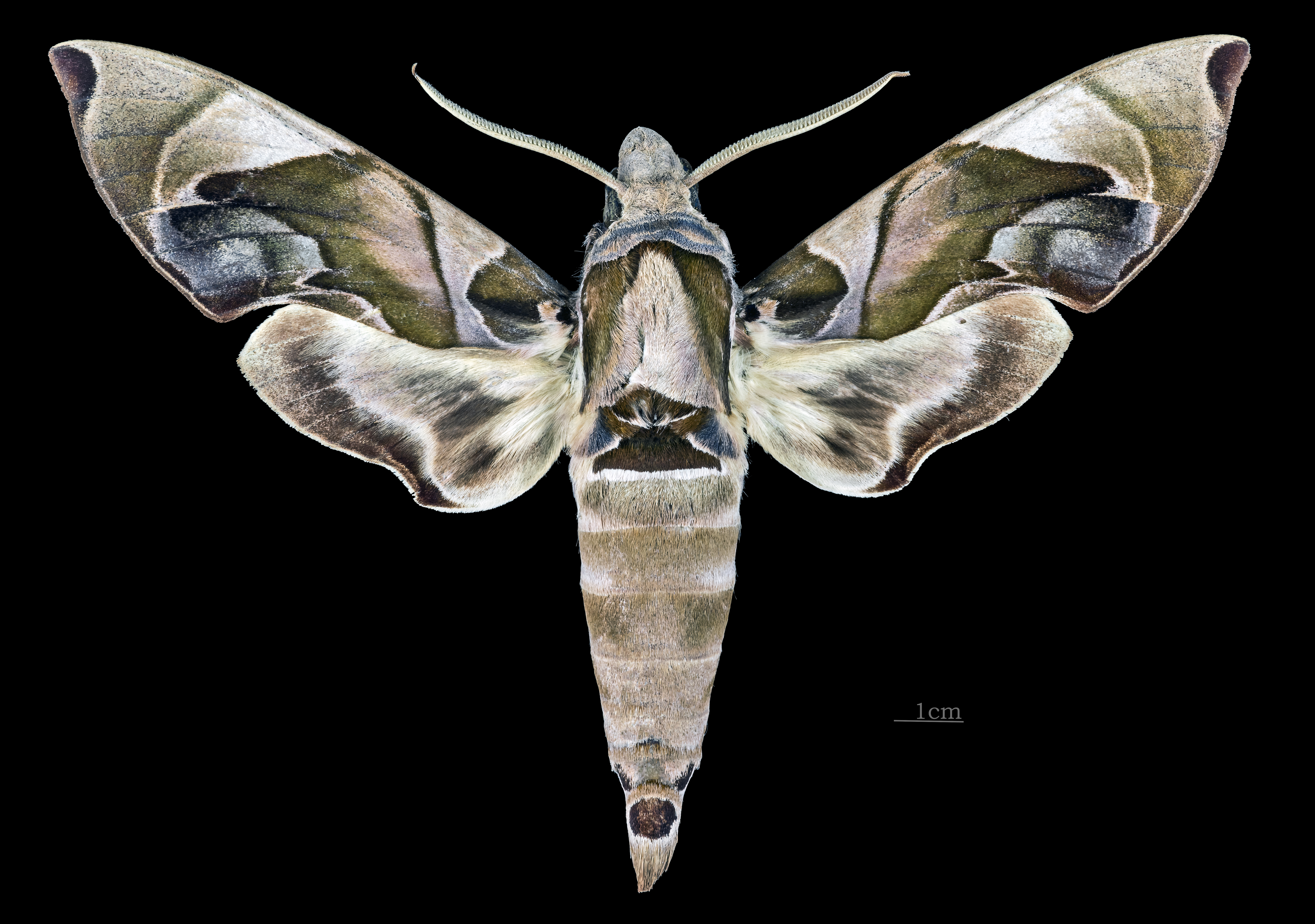
- D. p. protrudens, male dorsal
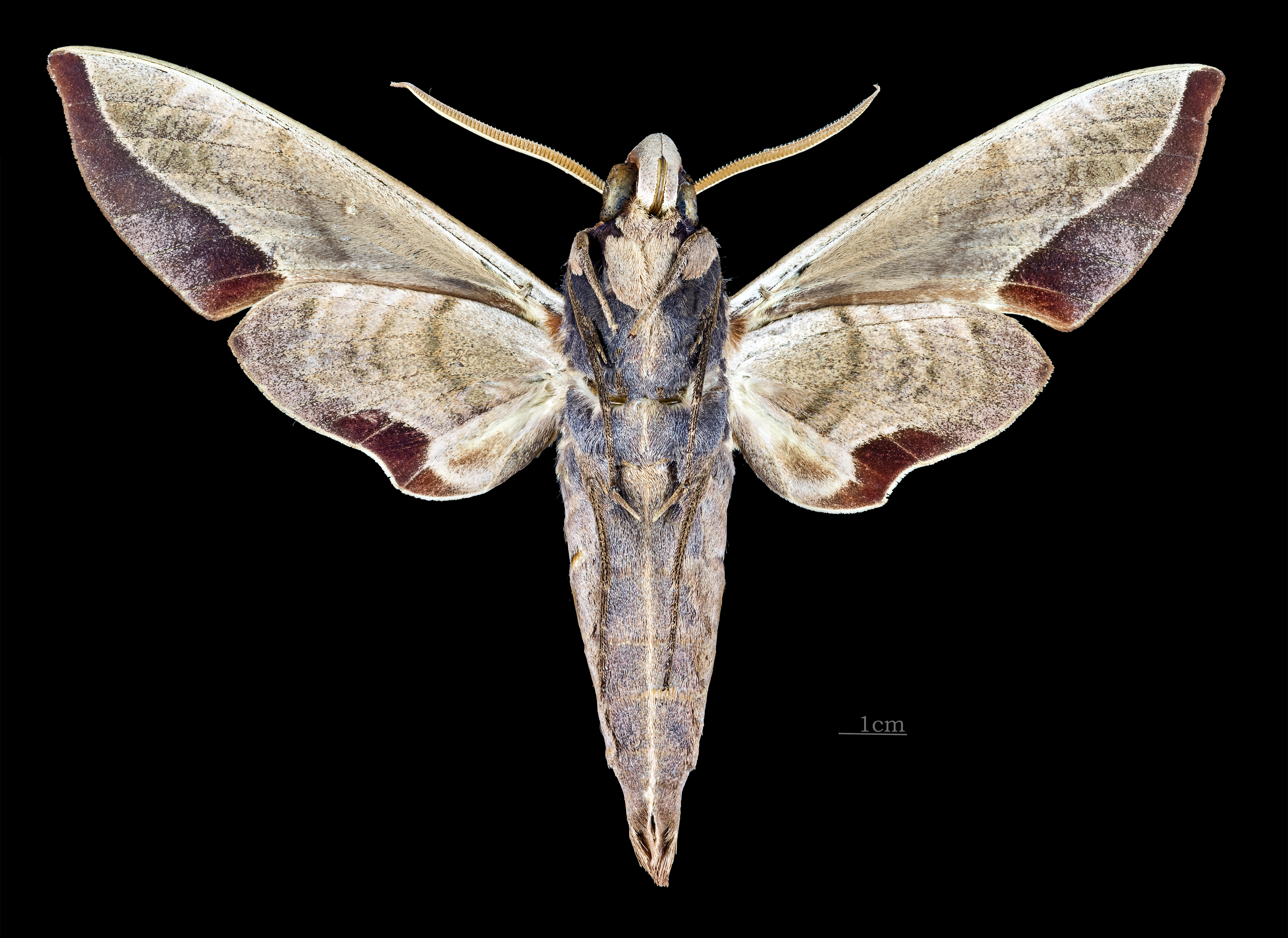
- D. p. protrudens, male ventral

Scientific classification
- Kingdom: Animalia
- Phylum: Arthropoda
- Class: Insecta
- Order: Lepidoptera
- Family: Sphingidae
- Genus: Daphnis
- Species: D. protrudens

Binomial name
- Daphnis protrudens Felder, 1874

Synonyms
- Daphnis neriastri Boisduval, 1875

= Daphnis protrudens =

Species of moth

Daphnis protrudens is a moth of the family Sphingidae.

== Distribution ==
It is known from Indonesia, Papua New Guinea and Queensland.

== Description ==
The wingspan is about 100 mm (3.9 in).

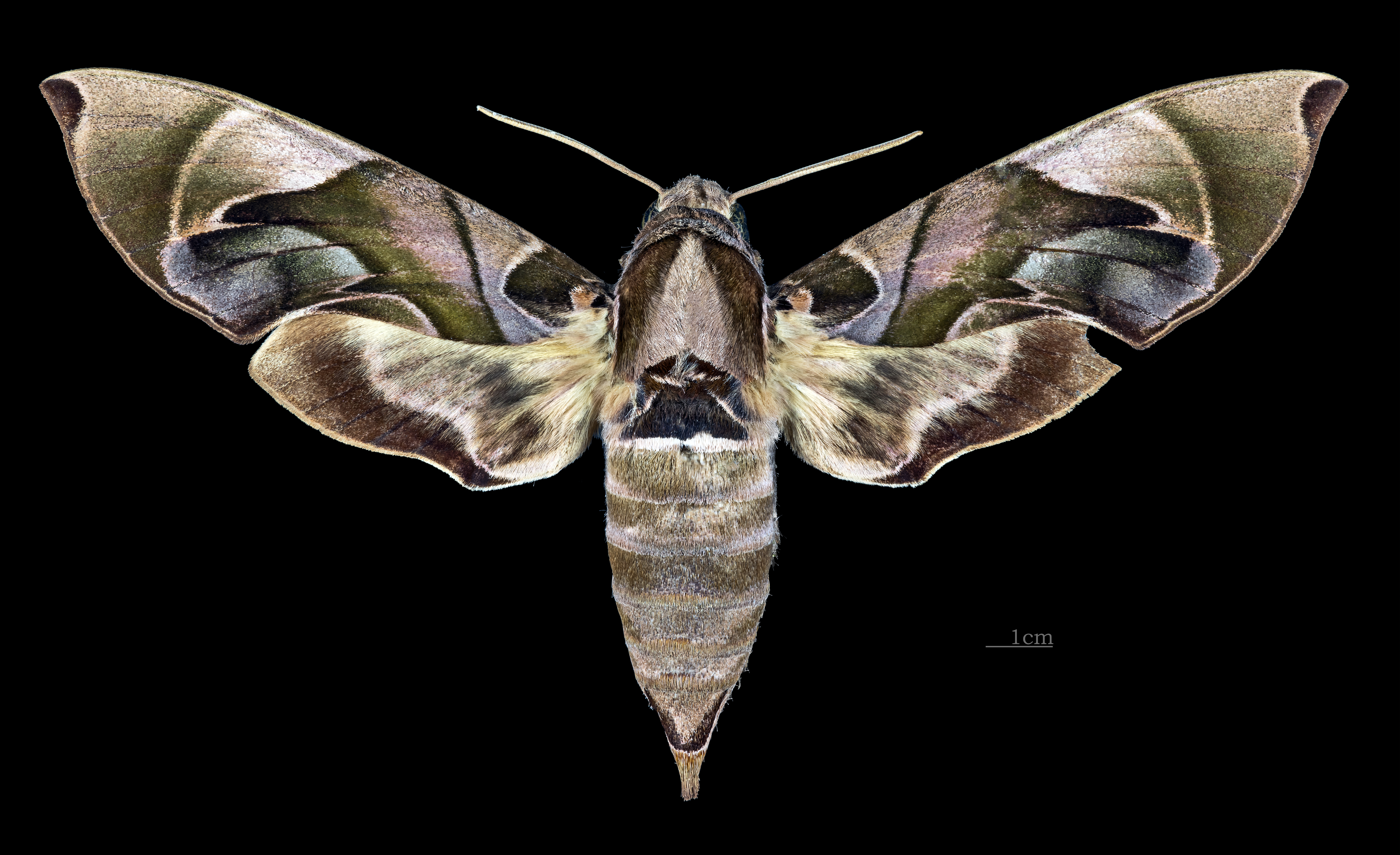
Female dorsal

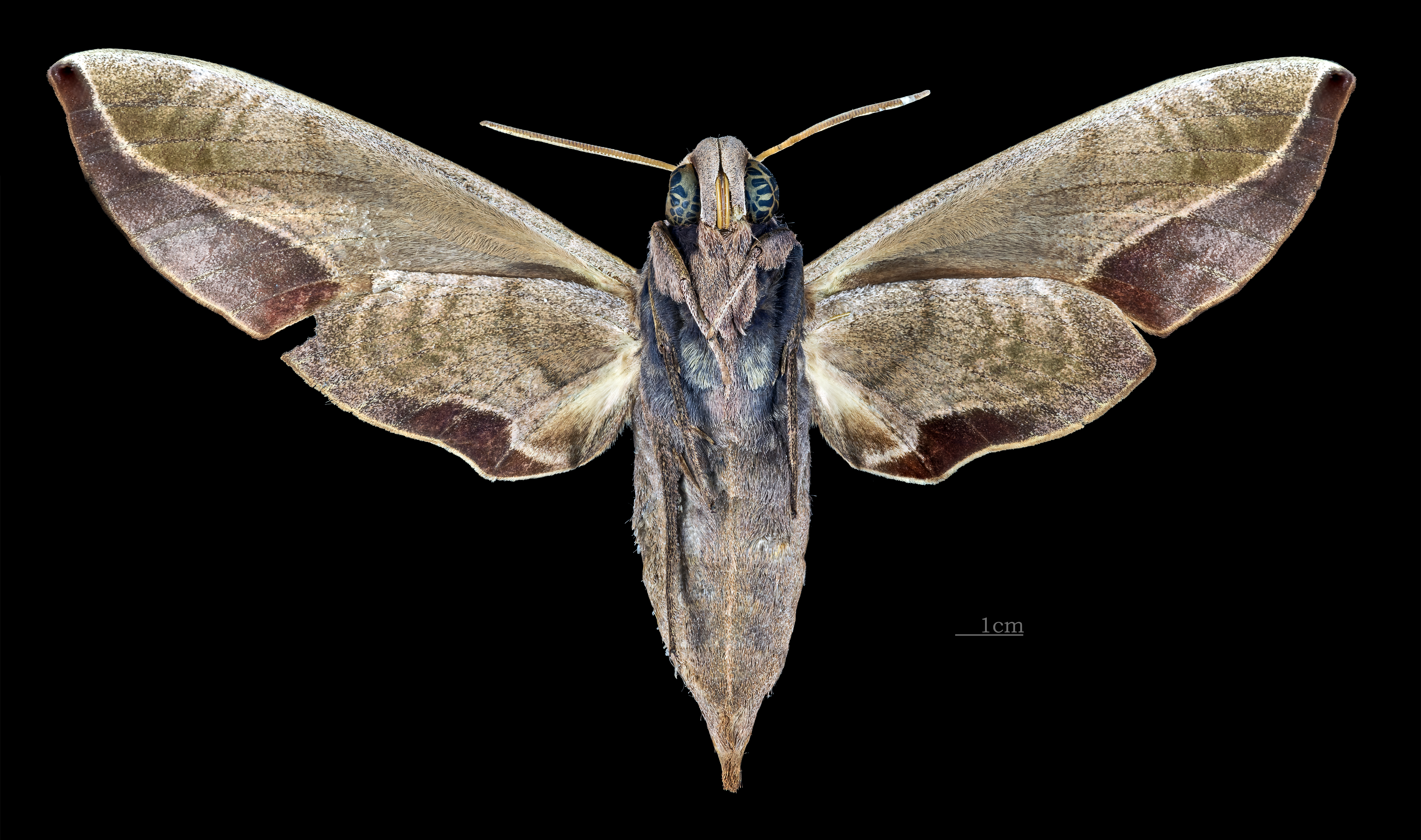
Female ventral

== Biology ==
The larvae have been recorded feeding on Timonius timon.

== Subspecies ==
- Daphnis protrudens protrudens
- Daphnis protrudens lecourti Cadiou, 1997 (Sulawesi)
