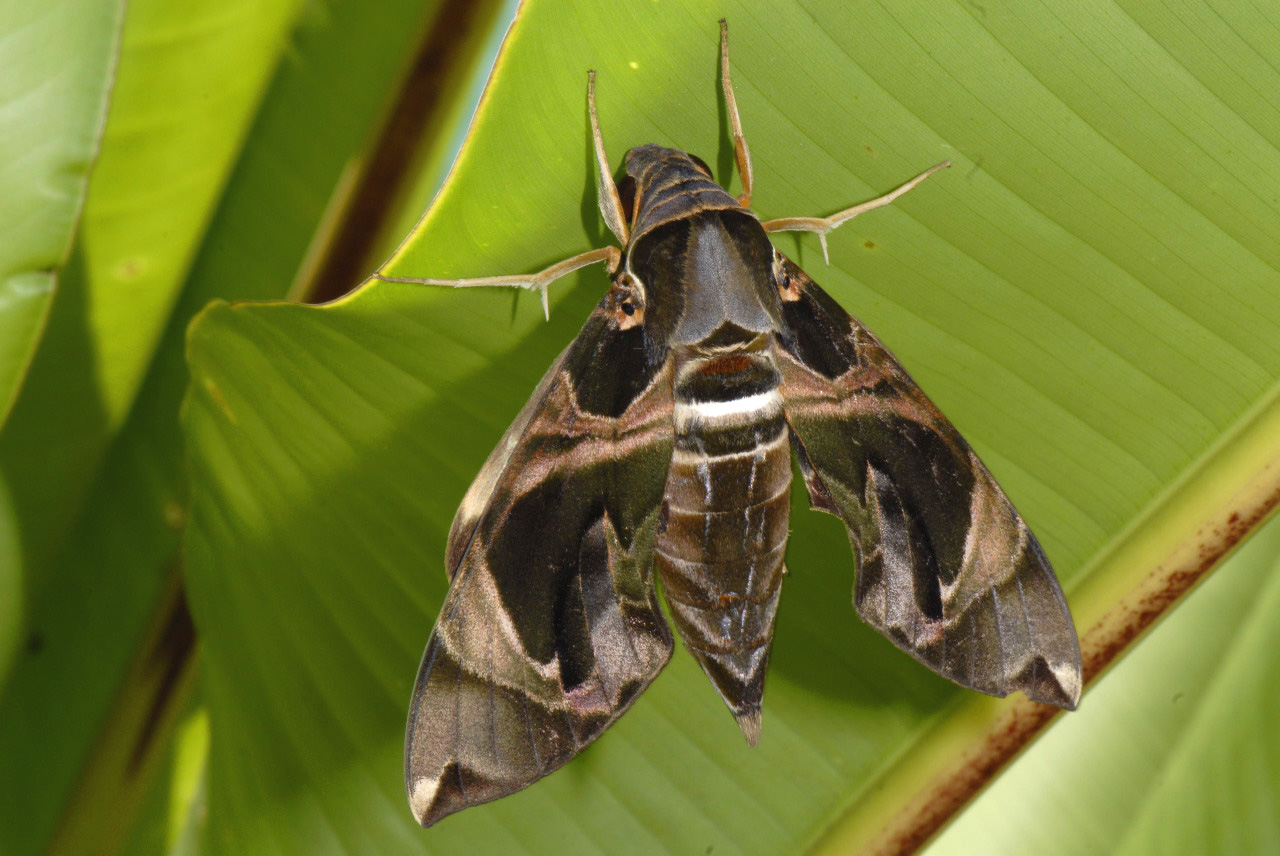
- Live adult

Scientific classification
- Kingdom: Animalia
- Phylum: Arthropoda
- Class: Insecta
- Order: Lepidoptera
- Family: Sphingidae
- Genus: Daphnis
- Species: D. hypothous

Binomial name
- Daphnis hypothous (Cramer, 1780)

Synonyms
- Sphinx hypothous Cramer, 1780

= Daphnis hypothous =

Jade hawkmoth

Species of moth

Daphnis hypothous, the jade hawkmoth, is a species of moth in the family Sphingidae described by Pieter Cramer in 1780. It is known from Sri Lanka, India, Nepal, Myanmar, southern China, Taiwan, Thailand, Malaysia, and Indonesia. It is a rare vagrant to the Western Palaearctic realm. During the last hundred years a number have been discovered within the Middle East and one was even found in Scotland late in the 20th century but this was probably imported as a pupa with cargo.

== Description ==
The wingspan is 86–120 mm. It is a very fast flyer and is attracted to both sweet-smelling flowers and light. It differs from Daphnis nerii in having the head and collar uniformly dark purplish brown. Thorax and first two abdominal segments are dark green with a white fringe to the first segment. Other abdominal segments are dark olive green with the streaks and spots as in D. nerii.

Wings are similar to D. nerii but very much darker on both dorsal and ventral side. A white spot is present at the apex of forewing and at the end of cell of forewing ventral side.

Larva is green with yellow dots at its sides. There is a dark dorsal line, a subdorsal purple-red band, edged with yellow on thoracic somites and a blue ocellus on the third somite. Horn is purplish brown with white tubercles. Before changing to pupa, the larva becomes blotched with dark red.

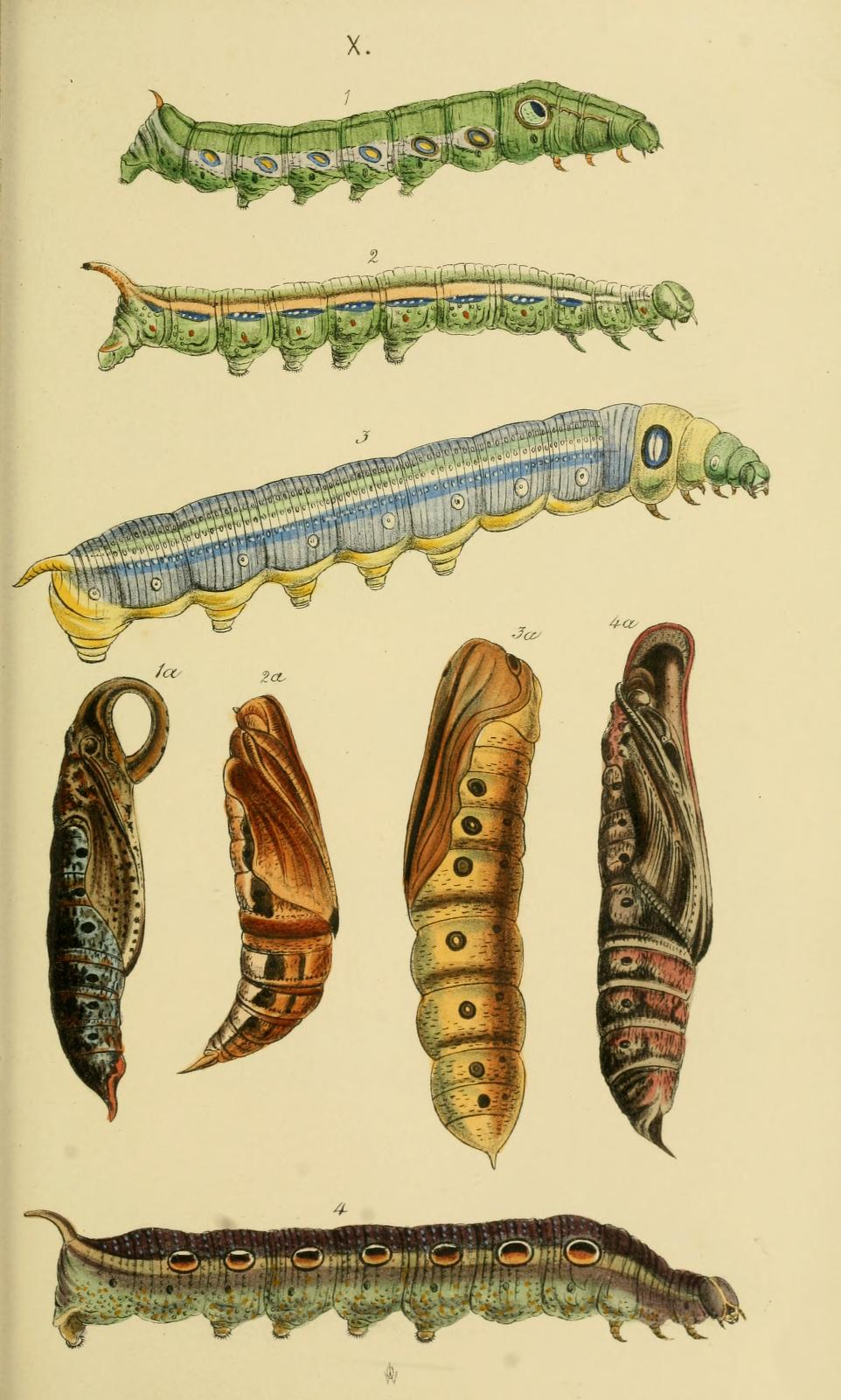
Daphnis hypothous larva (2) and pupa (2a)

Caterpillars can be found on Breonia, Cinchona, Ixora, Pavetta, Uncaria, Wendlandia and Alstonia plants.

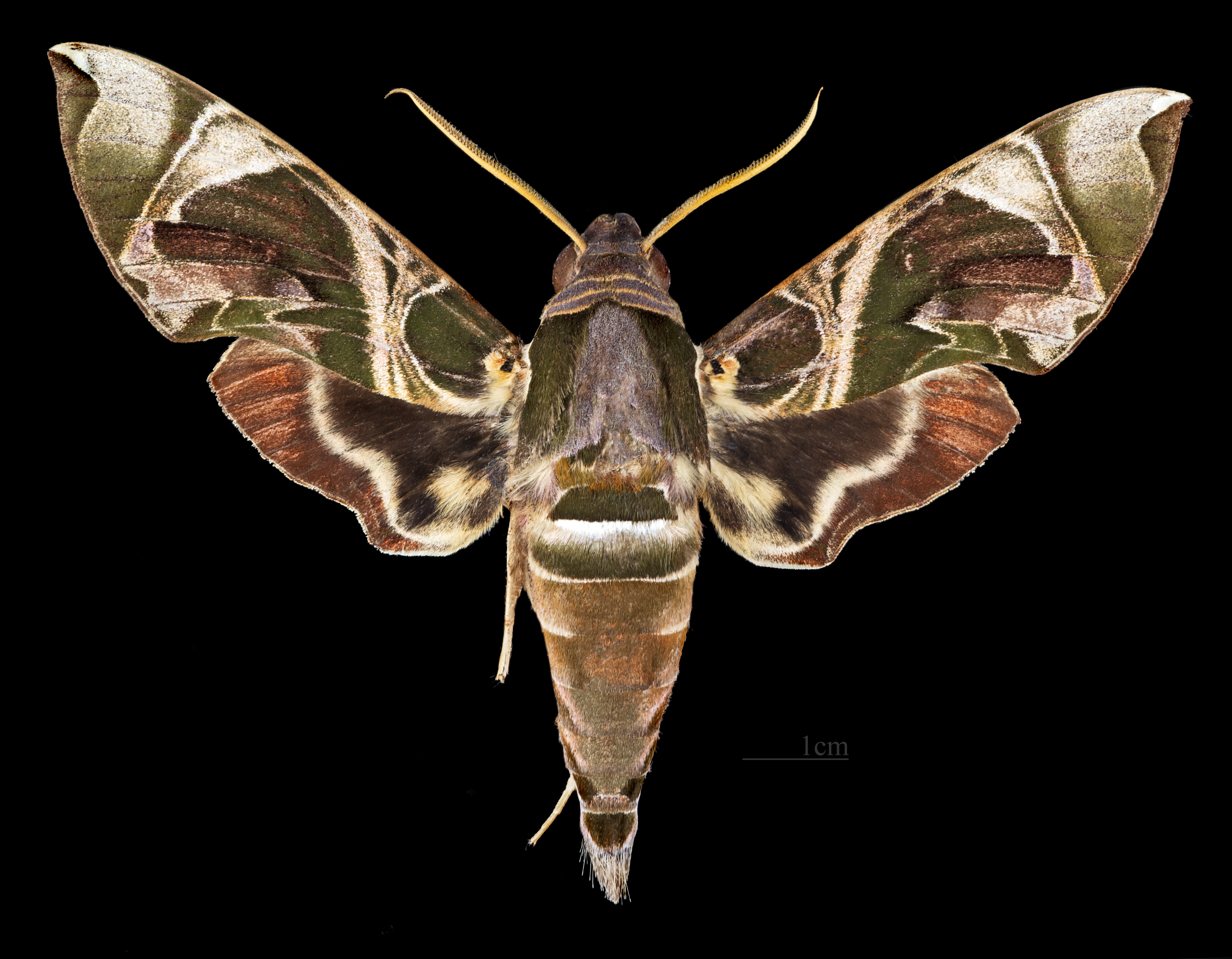
Daphnis hypothous hypothous ♂

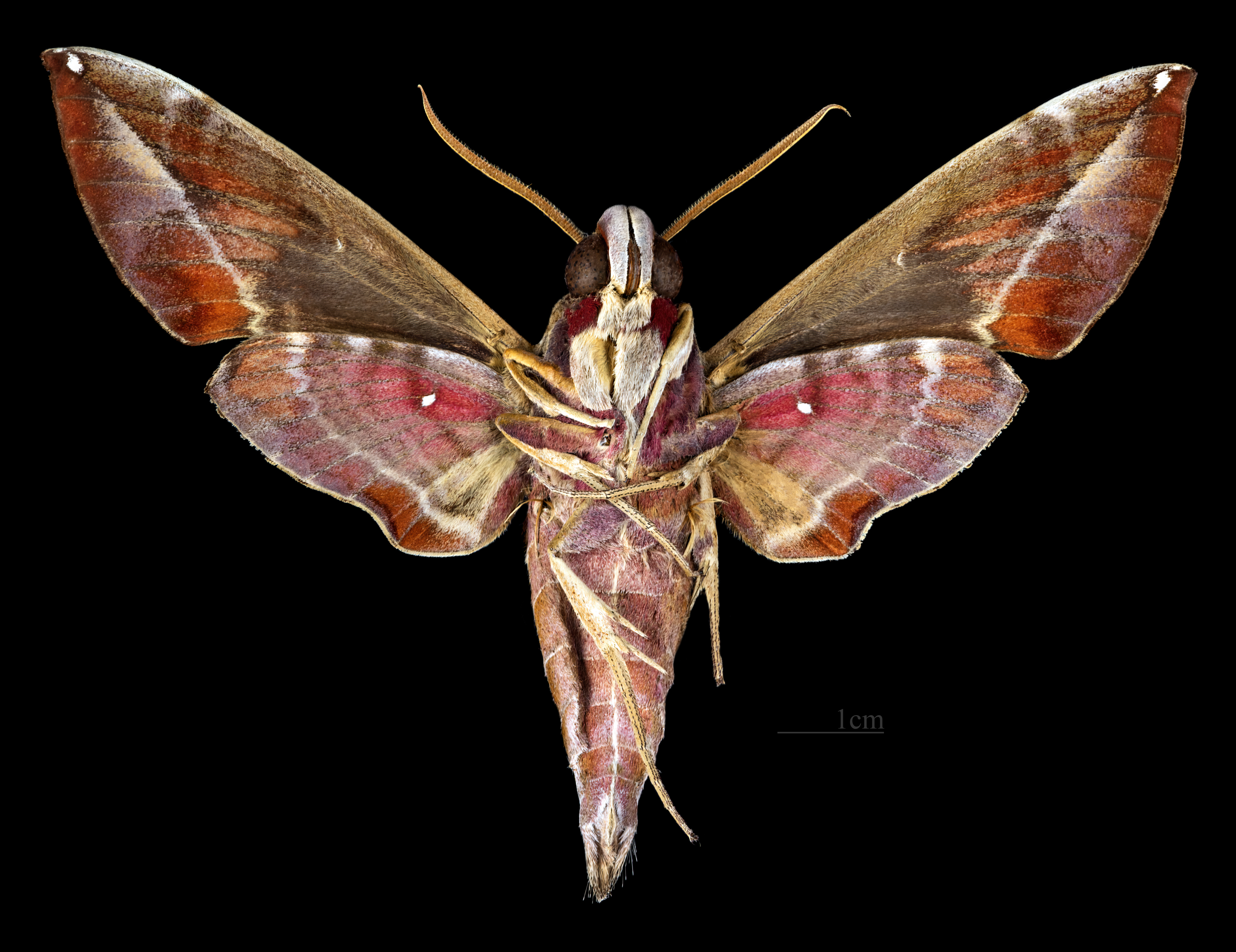
Daphnis hypothous hypothous ♂ △

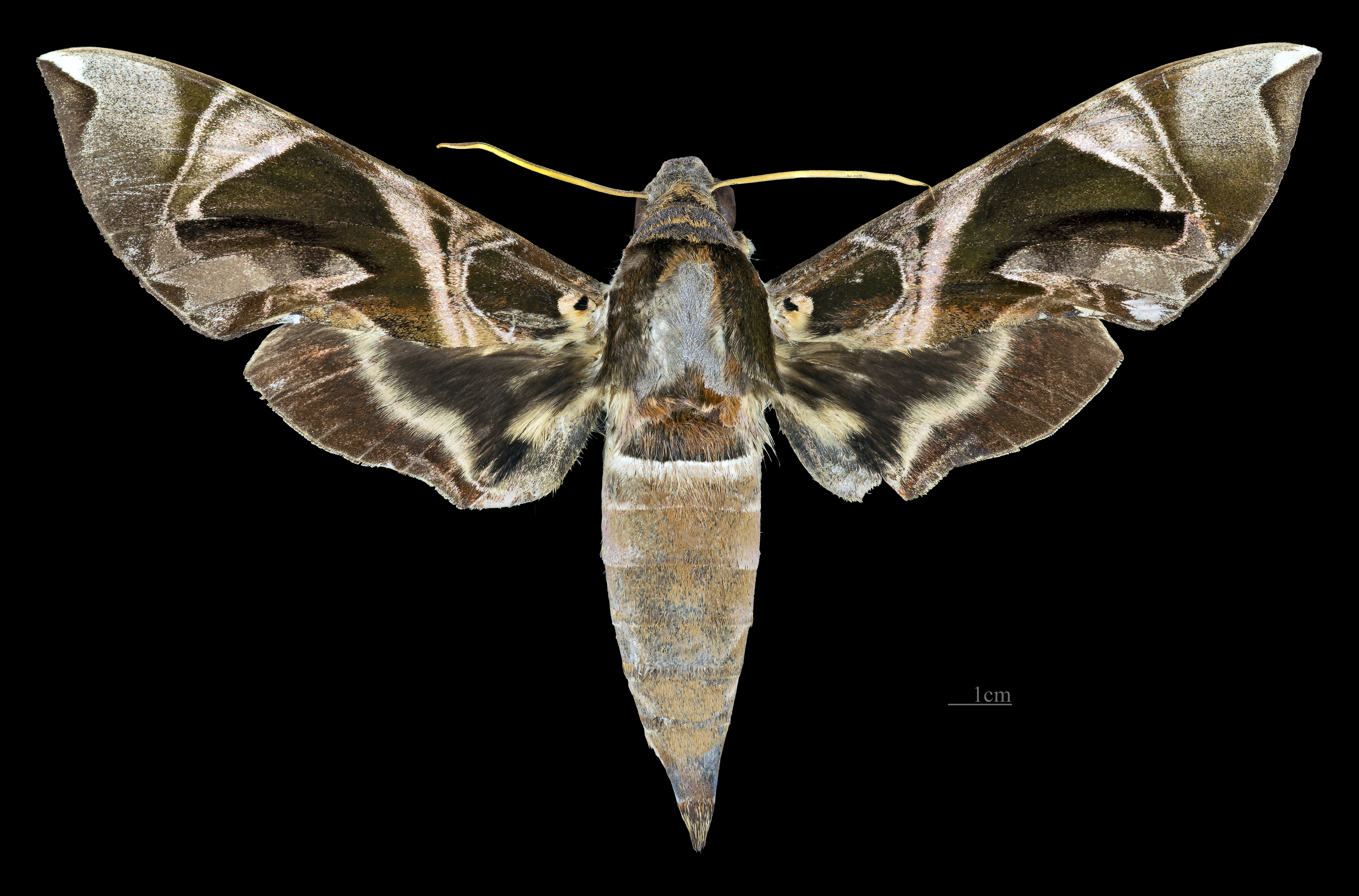
Daphnis hypothous hypothous ♀

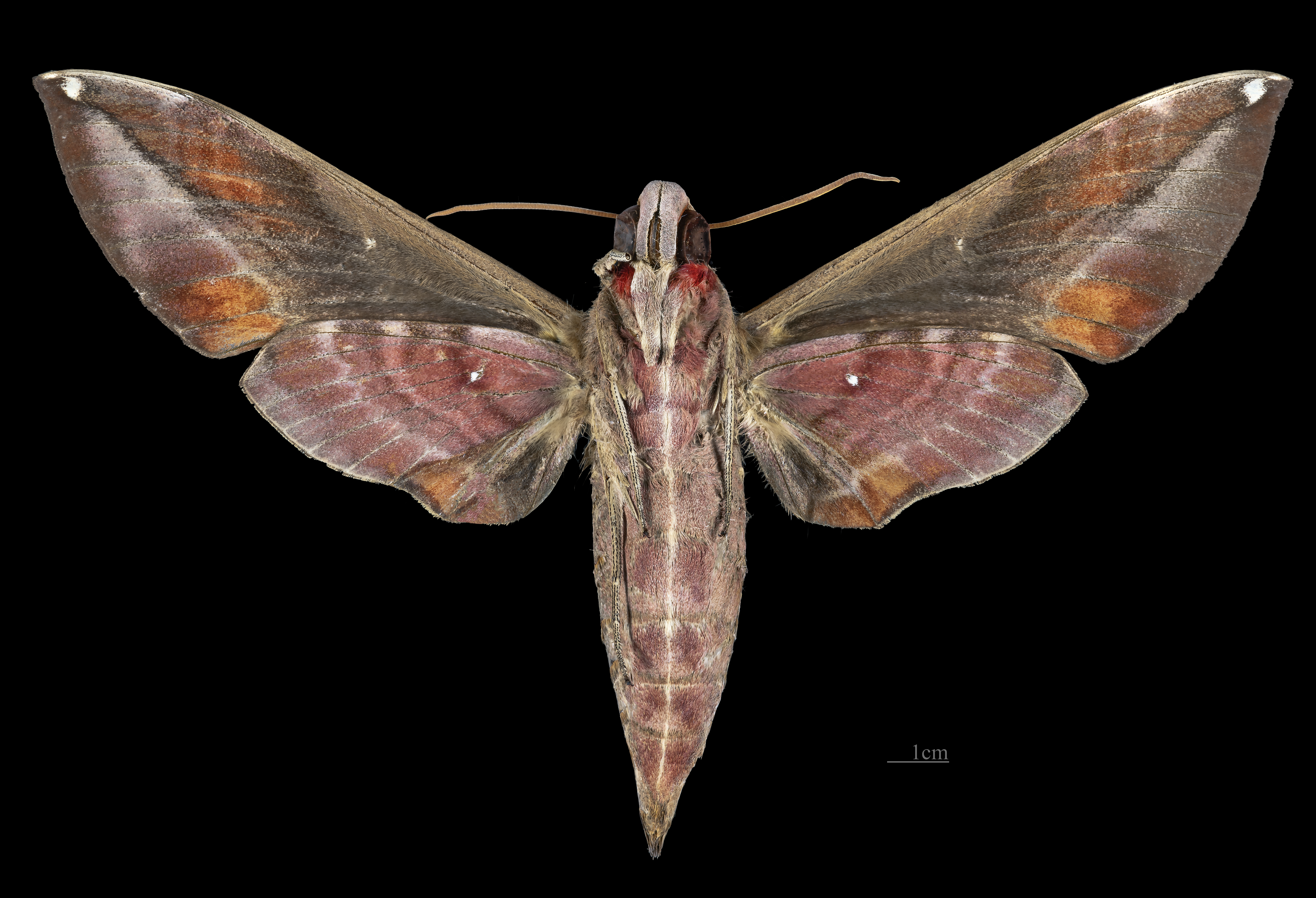
Daphnis hypothous hypothous ♀ △

== Subspecies ==
- Daphnis hypothous hypothous (Indonesia including the Andaman Islands and Seram)
- Daphnis hypothous crameri Eitschberger & Melichar, 2010 (South and South-East Asia)

== Gallery ==
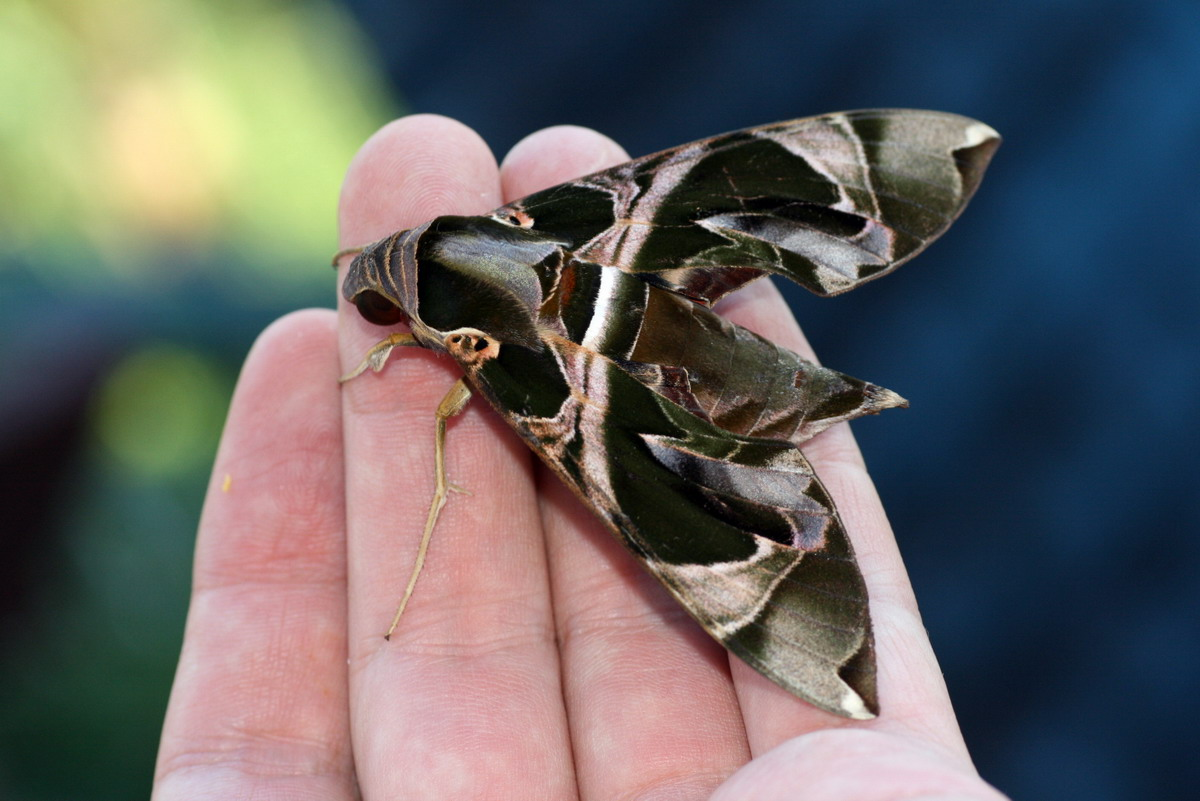

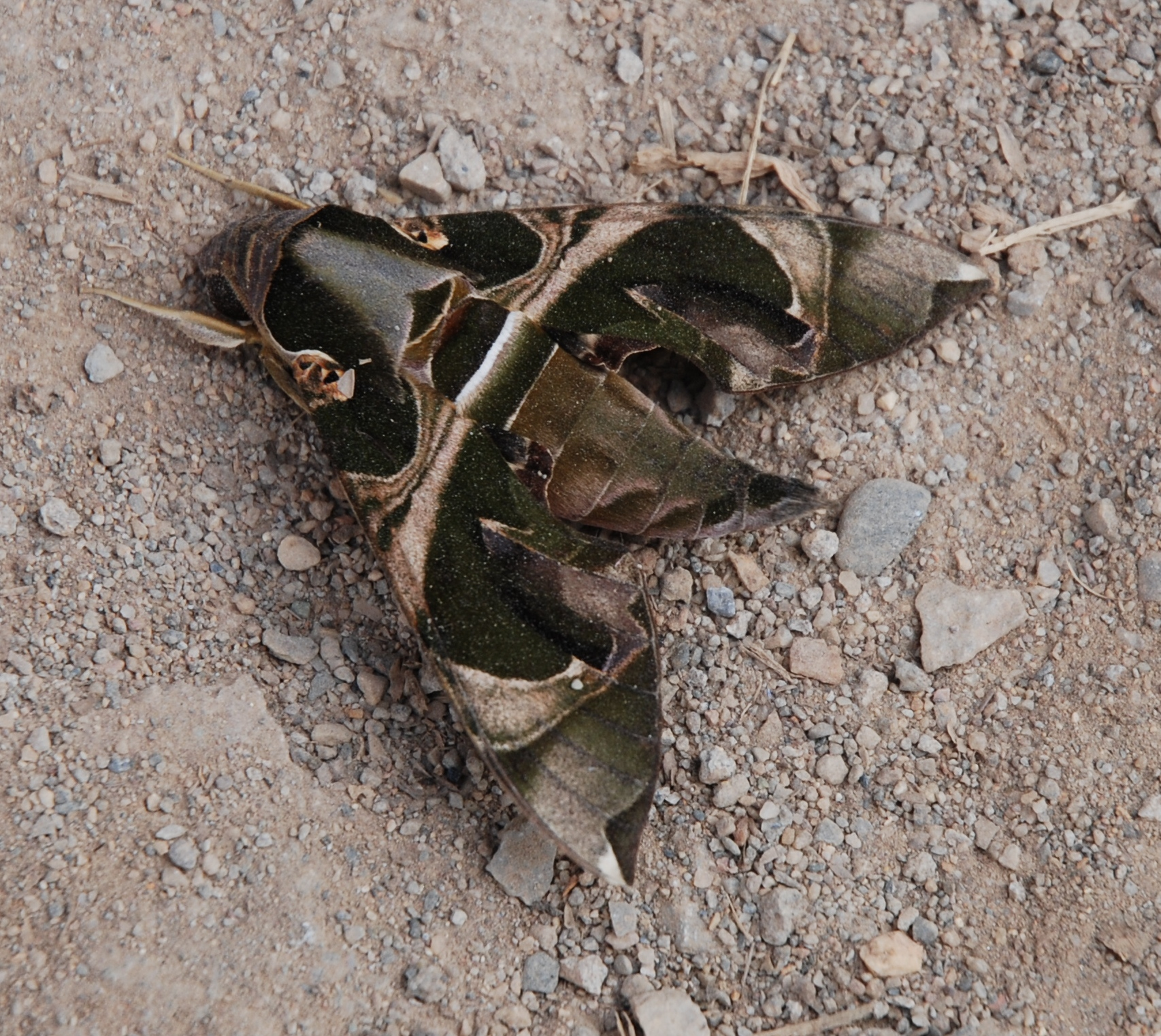
from Laos

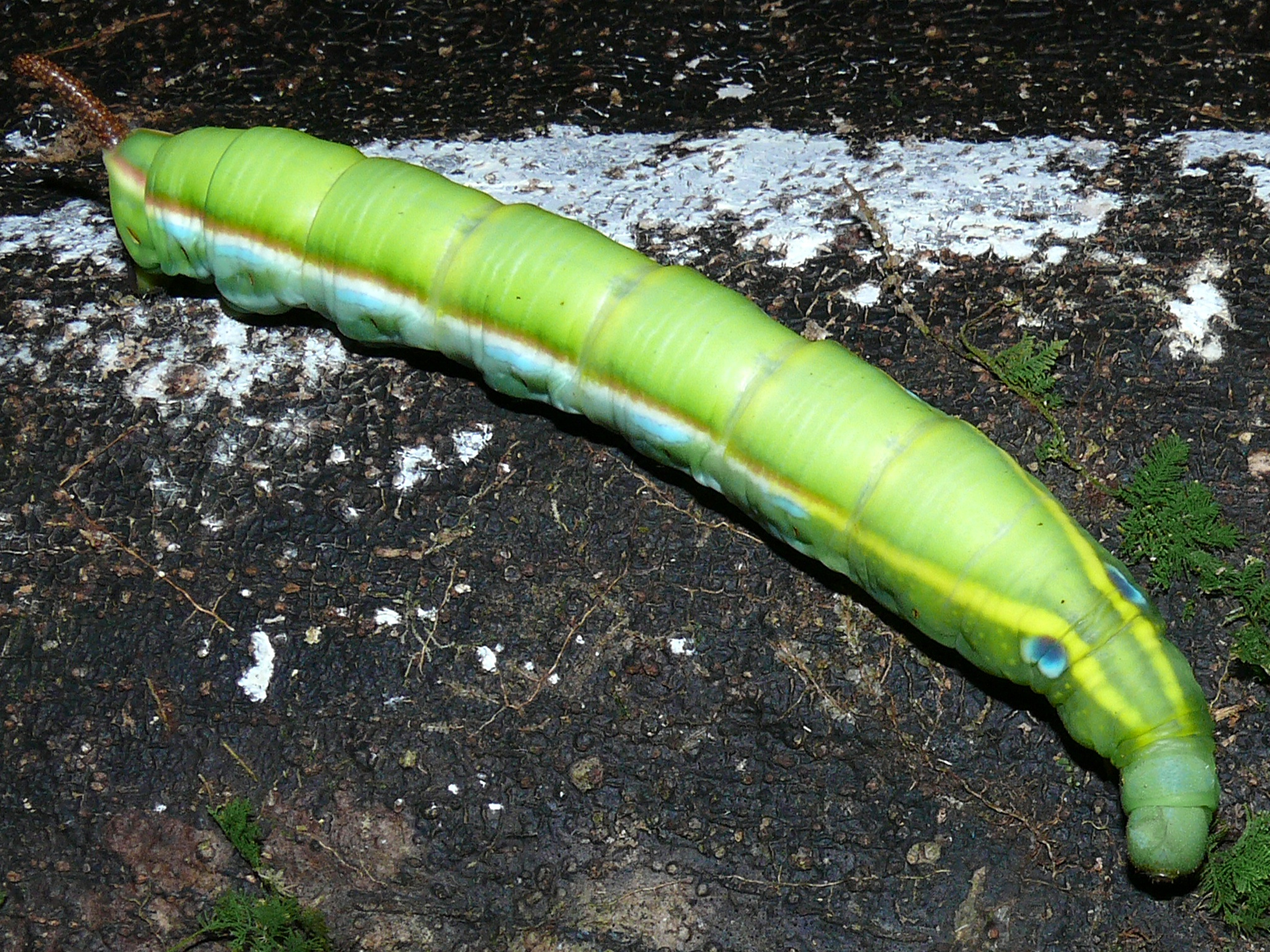
Caterpillar

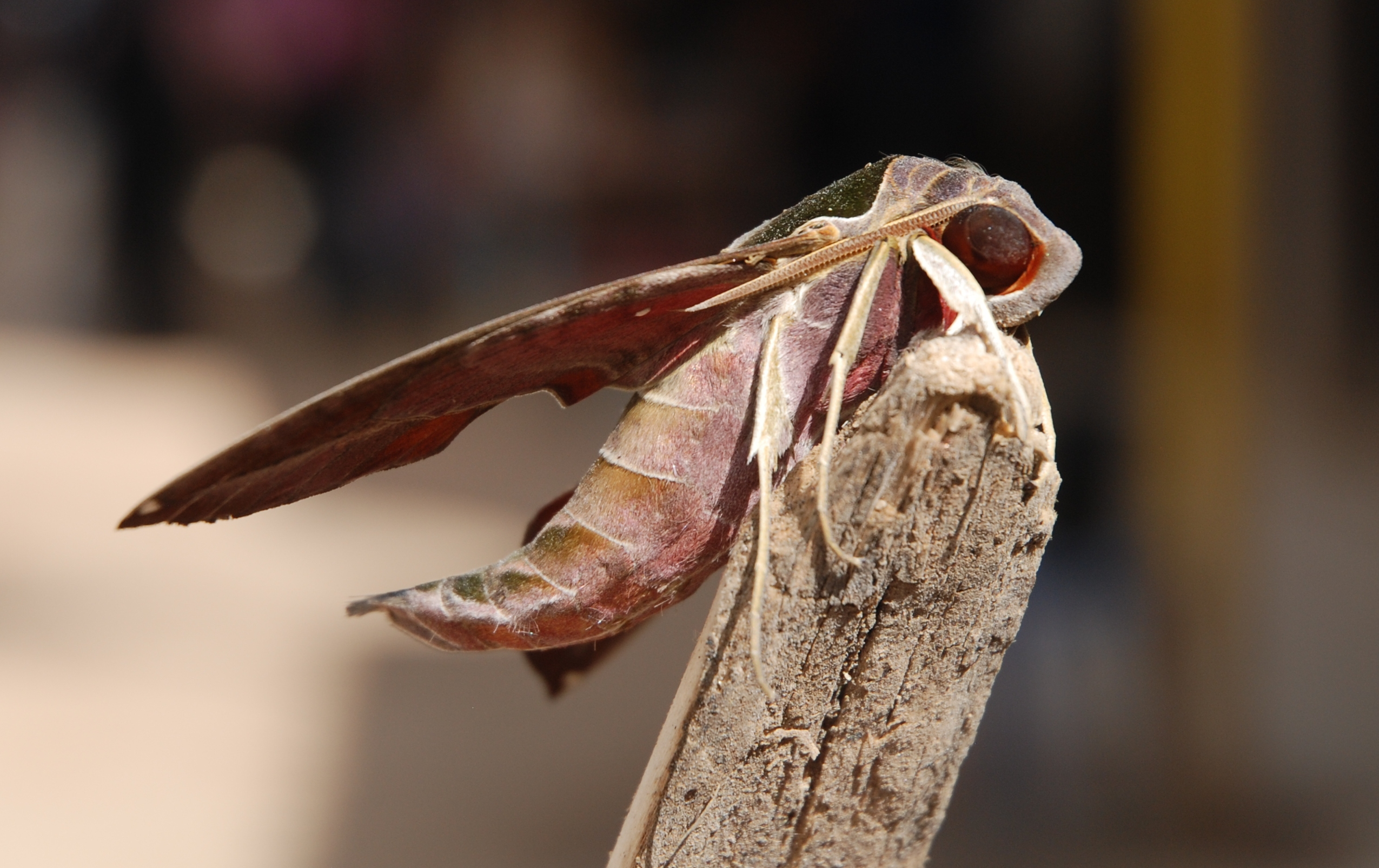

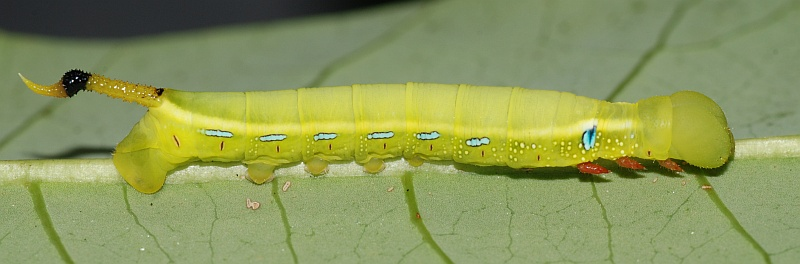
ssp. crameri

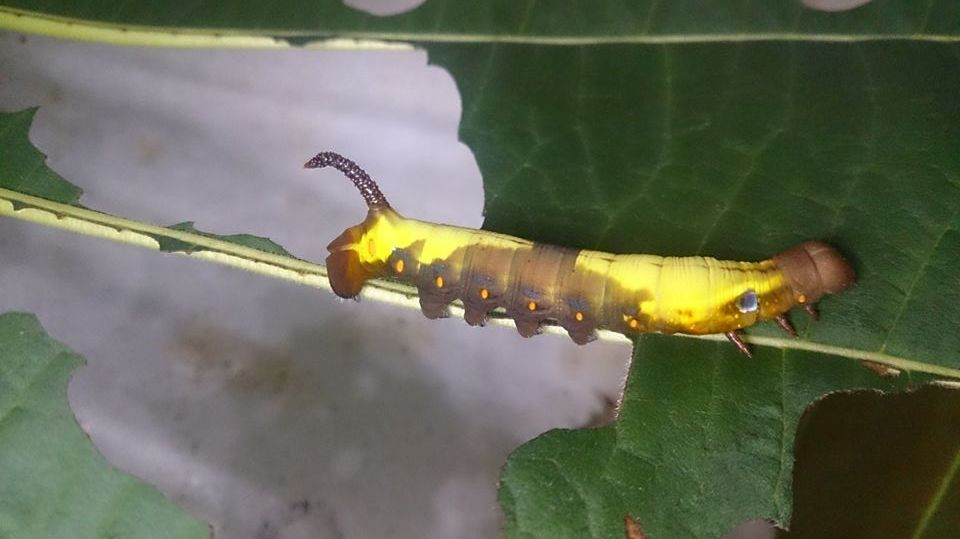
yellow-brown form

== Related species ==
- Daphnis nerii, white spot is absent at the apex of forewing.
