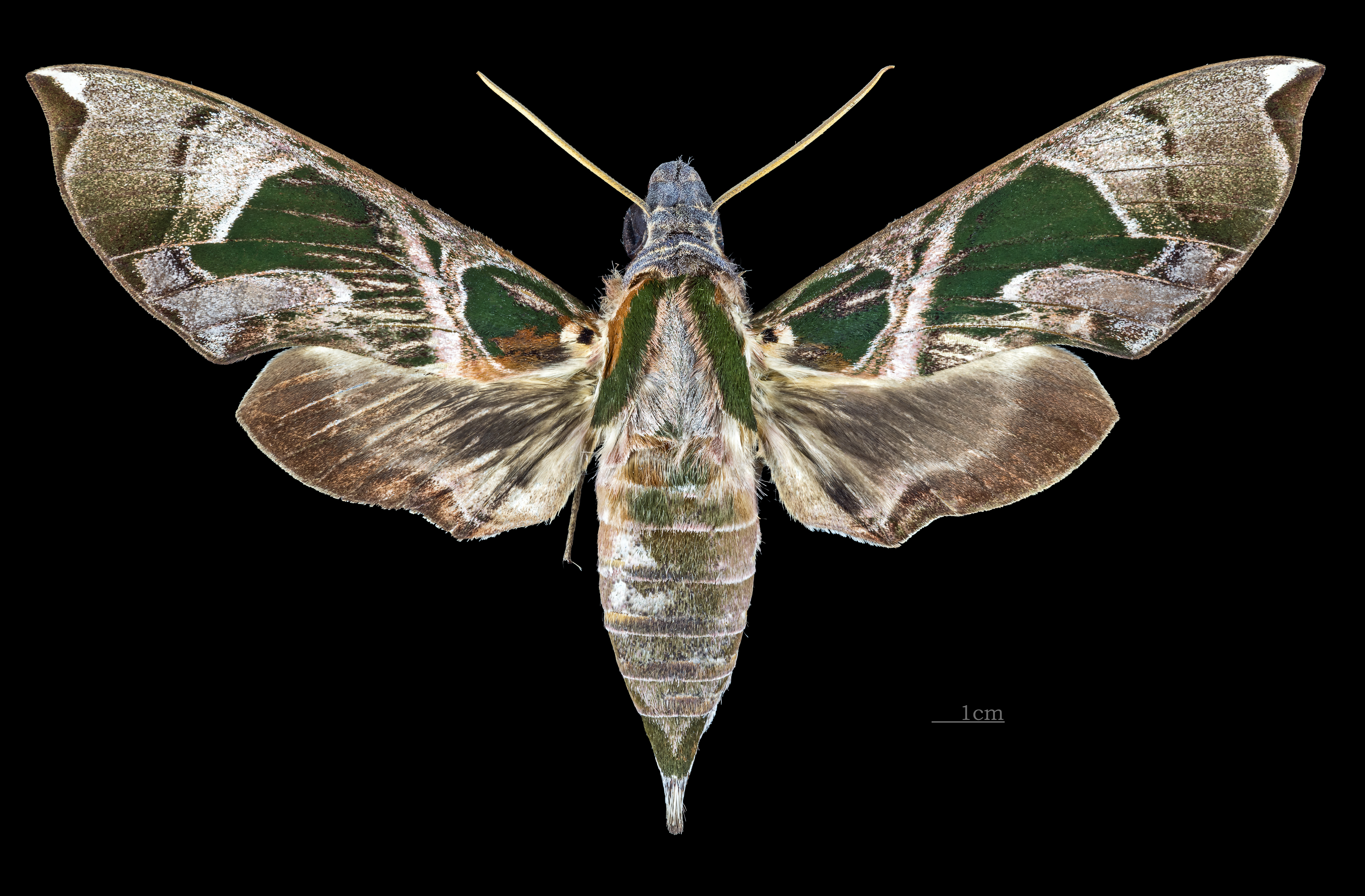
- Male dorsal
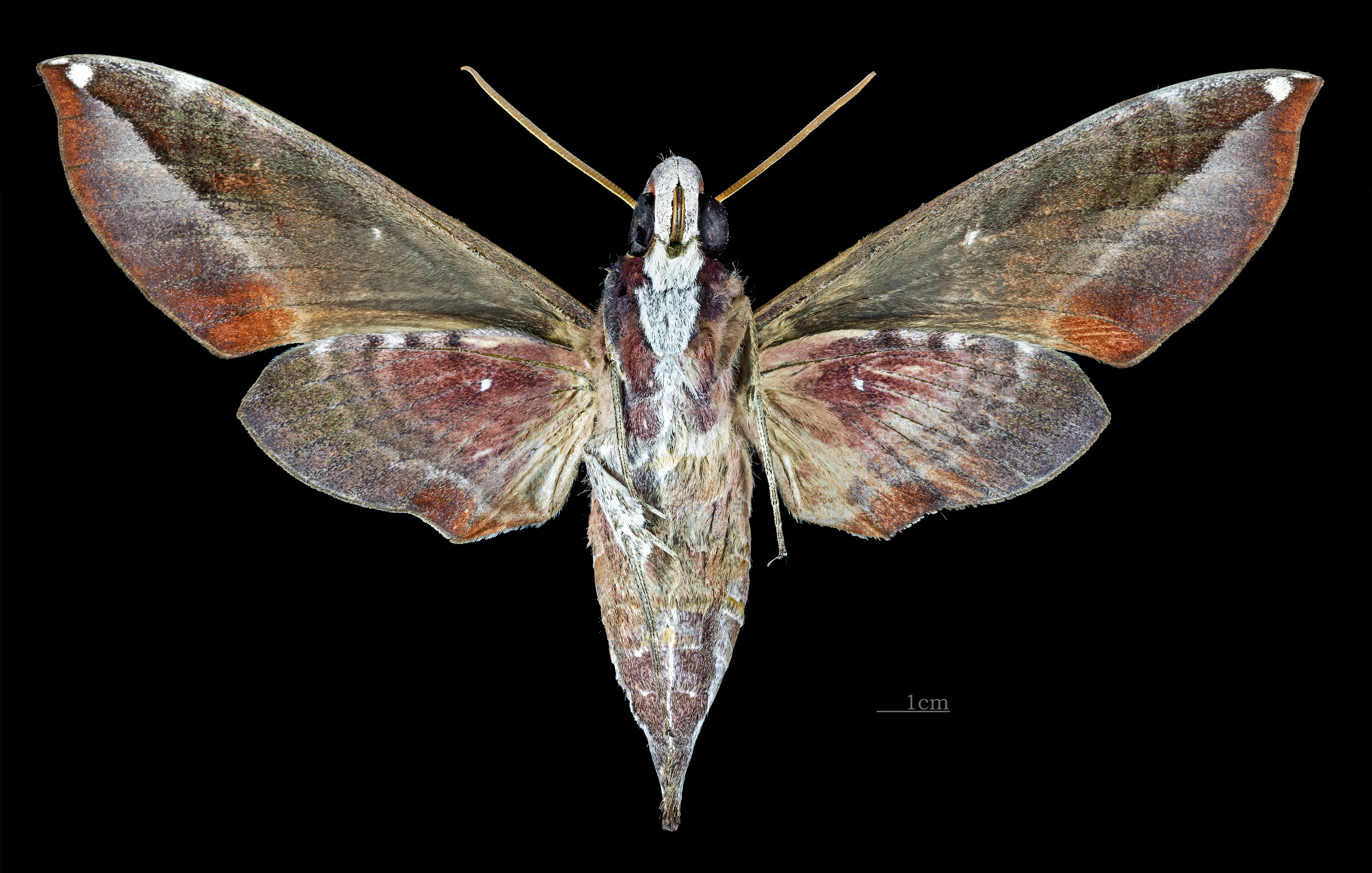
- Male ventral

Scientific classification
- Kingdom: Animalia
- Phylum: Arthropoda
- Clade: Pancrustacea
- Class: Insecta
- Order: Lepidoptera
- Family: Sphingidae
- Genus: Daphnis
- Species: D. hayesi

Binomial name
- Daphnis hayesi Cadiou, 1988

= Daphnis hayesi =

Species of moth

Daphnis hayesi is a moth of the family Sphingidae.

== Distribution ==
It is known from Sulawesi in Indonesia.
