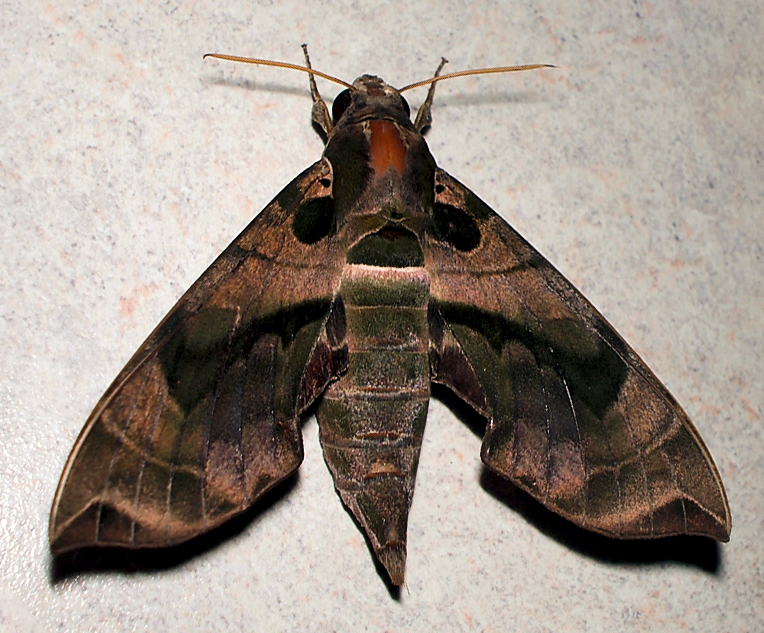

Scientific classification
- Kingdom: Animalia
- Phylum: Arthropoda
- Class: Insecta
- Order: Lepidoptera
- Family: Sphingidae
- Genus: Daphnis
- Species: D. placida

Binomial name
- Daphnis placida (Walker, 1856)

Synonyms
- Darapsa placida Walker, 1856; Choerocampa hesperus Boisduval, 1875; Daphnis andamana Druce, 1882; Daphnis angustans R. Felder, 1874; Daphnis horsfieldii Butler, 1876; Deilephila jamdenae Debauche, 1934; Daphnis torenia rosacea Rothschild, 1894

= Daphnis placida =

Species of moth

Daphnis placida is a moth of the family Sphingidae.

== Distribution ==
It is known from Thailand, Malaysia, Indonesia (including Borneo), the Solomon Islands and the northern half of Australia. This species has also been recorded in New Zealand.

== Description ==
The wingspan is about 60 mm.

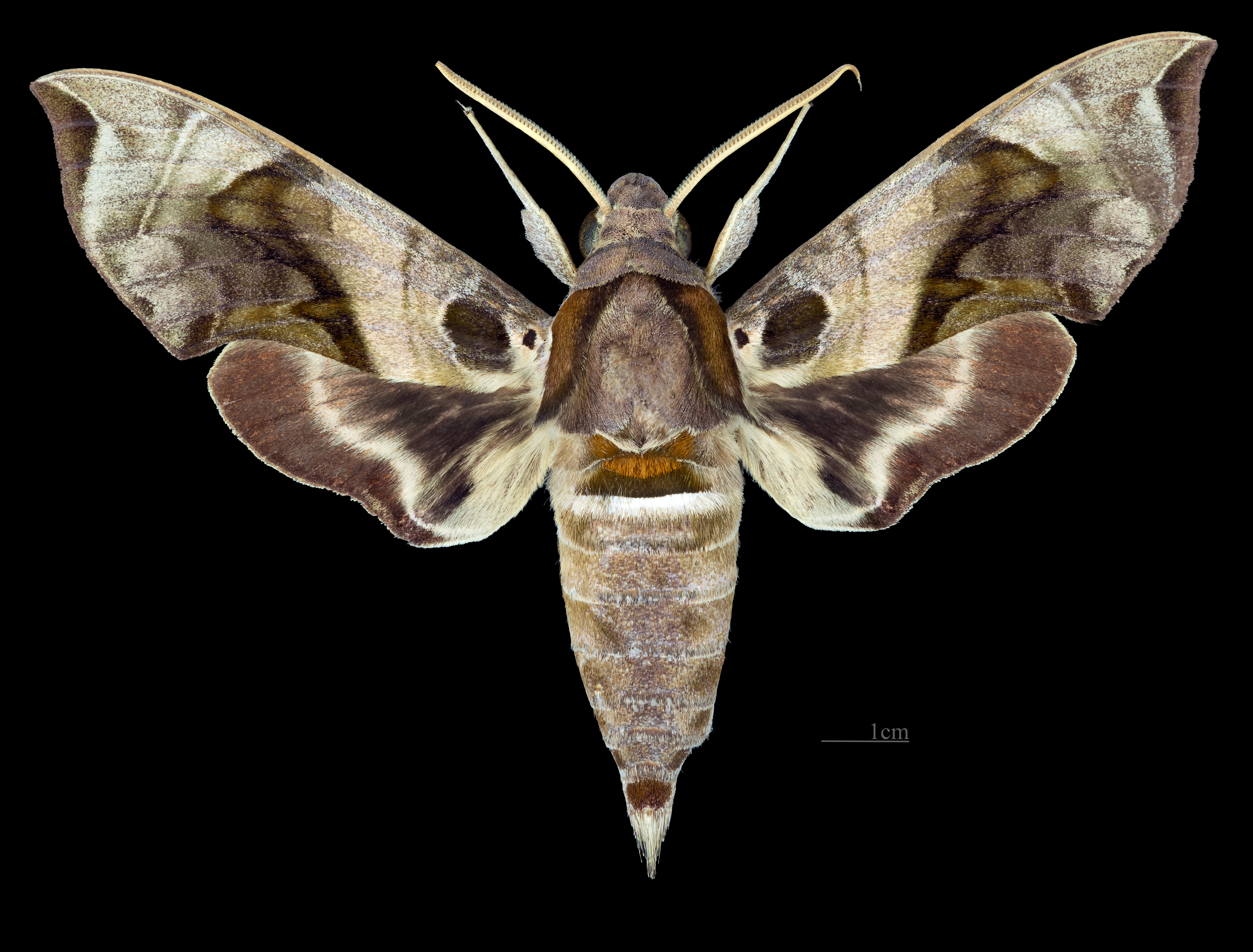
Male dorsal

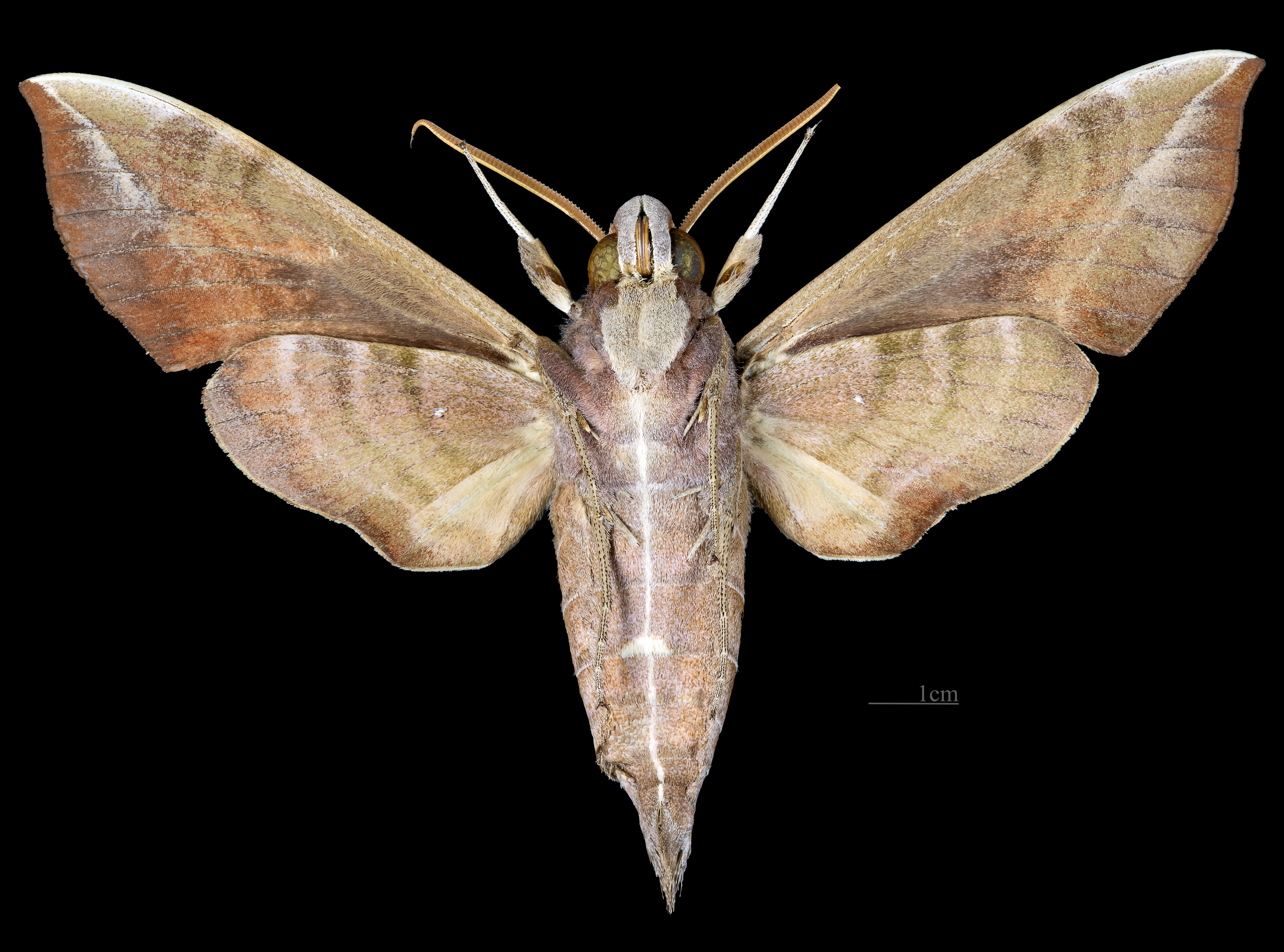
Male ventral

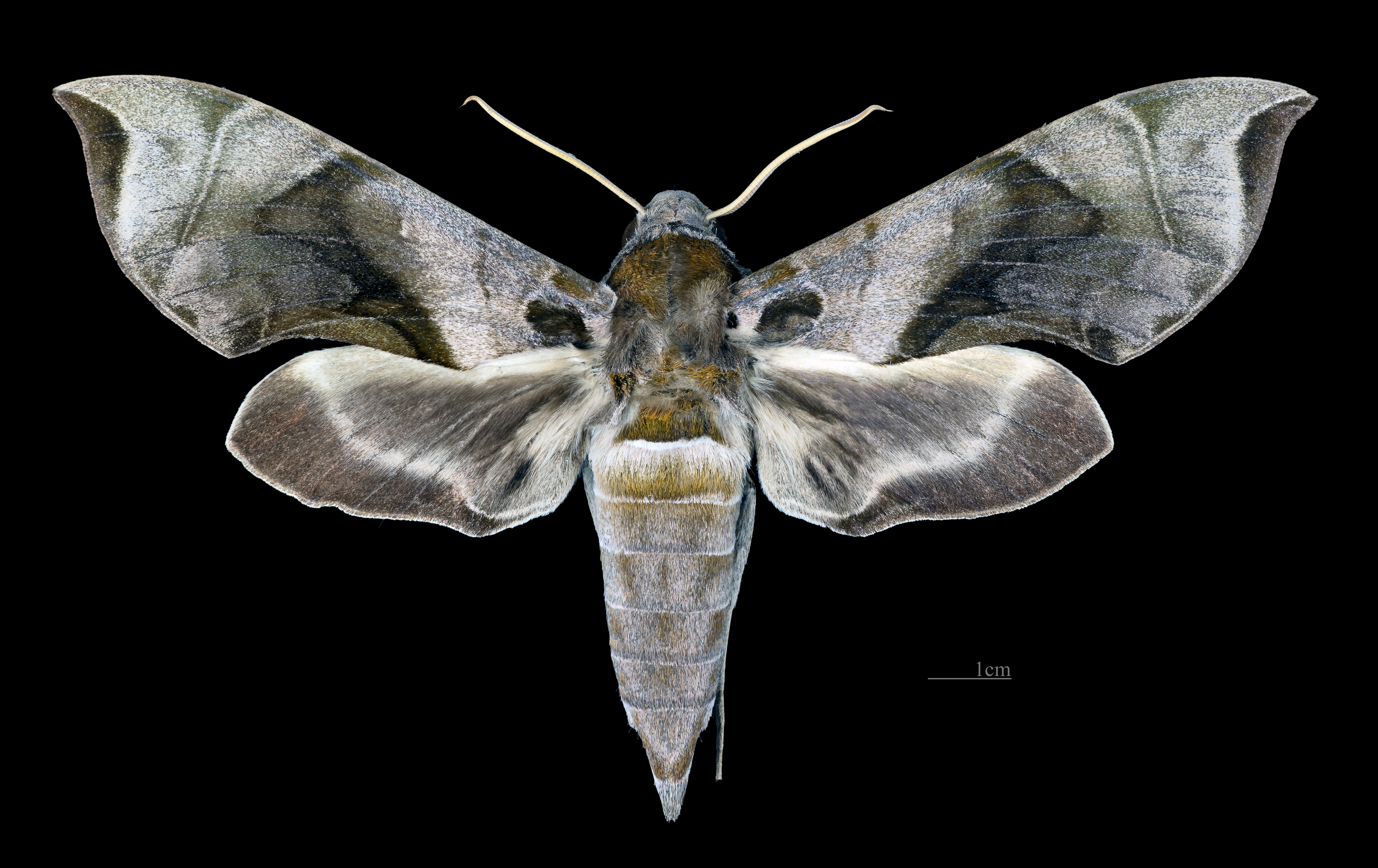
Female dorsal

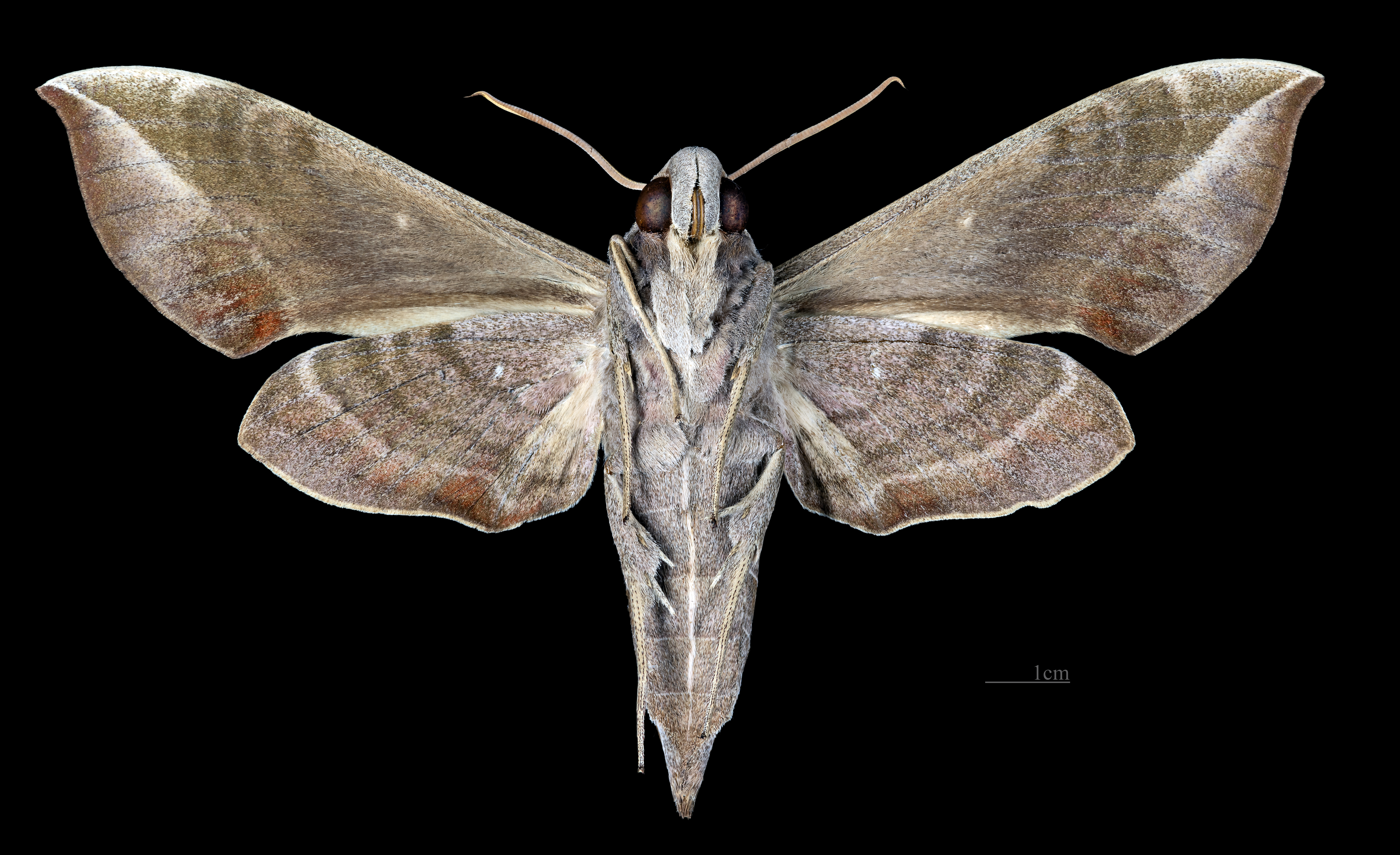
Female ventral

The larvae have been recorded feeding on Alstonia constricta, Neisosperma kilneri and Tabernaemontana angustisepala.

== Subspecies ==
- Daphnis placida placida
- Daphnis placida salomonis Rothschild & Jordan, 1906 (Solomon Islands)
