= List of moths of Australia (Sphingidae) =

Partial list of Australian moths

This is a list of the Australian moth species of the family Sphingidae. It also acts as an index to the species articles and forms part of the full List of moths of Australia.

== Macroglossinae ==
- Acosmeryx anceus (Stoll, 1781)
- Acosmeryx miskini (Murray, 1873)
- Angonyx excellens (Rothschild, 1911)
- Angonyx papuana Rothschild & Jordan, 1903
- Cephonodes hylas (Linnaeus, 1771)
- Cephonodes janus (Miskin, 1891)
- Cephonodes kingii (W.S. Macleay, 1826)
- Cephonodes picus (Cramer, 1777)
- Cizara ardeniae (Lewin, 1805)
- Daphnis dohertyi Rothschild, 1897
- Daphnis hypothous (Cramer, 1780)
- Daphnis moorei (W.J. Macleay, 1866)
- Daphnis placida (Walker, 1856)
- Daphnis protrudens R. Felder, 1874
- Eupanacra splendens (Rothschild, 1894)
- Gnathothlibus eras (Boisduval, 1832)
- Gnathothlibus erotus (Cramer, 1777)
- Gnathothlibus australiensis Lachlan, 2004
- Hippotion boerhaviae (Fabricius, 1775)
- Hippotion brennus (Stoll, 1782)
- Hippotion celerio (Linnaeus, 1758)
- Hippotion rosetta (Swinhoe, 1892)
- Hippotion scrofa (Boisduval, 1832)
- Hippotion velox (Fabricius, 1793)
- Hyles livornicoides (T.P. Lucas, 1892)
- Macroglossum alcedo (Boisduval, 1832)
- Macroglossum corythus (Walker, 1856)
- Macroglossum dohertyi (Rothschild, 1894)
- Macroglossum heliophila (Boisduval, 1875)
- Macroglossum hirundo (Boisduval, 1832)
- Macroglossum insipida (Butler, 1875)
- Macroglossum joannisi Rothschild & Jordan, 1903
- Macroglossum micacea (Walker, 1856)
- Macroglossum nubilum Rothschild & Jordan, 1903
- Macroglossum prometheus (Boisduval, 1875)
- Macroglossum rectans Rothschild & Jordan, 1903
- Macroglossum tenebrosa (T.P. Lucas, 1891)
- Macroglossum vacillans (Walker, 1865)
- Nephele hespera (Fabricius, 1775)
- Nephele subvaria (Walker, 1856)
- Theretra clotho (Drury, 1773)
- Theretra indistincta (Butler, 1877)
- Theretra inornata (Walker, 1865)
- Theretra latreillii (W.S. Macleay, 1826)
- Theretra margarita (Kirby, 1877)
- Theretra nessus (Drury, 1773)
- Theretra oldenlandiae (Fabricius, 1775)
- Theretra queenslandi (T.P. Lucas, 1891)
- Theretra radiosa Rothschild & Jordan, 1916
- Theretra silhetensis (Walker, 1856)
- Theretra tryoni (Miskin, 1891)
- Theretra turneri (T.P. Lucas, 1891)
- Zacria vojtechi Haxaire & Melichar, 2003

== Smerinthinae ==
- Ambulyx dohertyi Rothschild, 1894
- Ambulyx wildei Miskin, 1891
- Coenotes eremophilae (T.P. Lucas, 1891)
- Coequosa australasiae (Donovan, 1805)
- Coequosa triangularis (Donovan, 1805)
- Hopliocnema brachycera (Lower, 1897)
- Imber tropicus Moulds, 1983
- Synoecha marmorata (T.P. Lucas, 1891)
- Tetrachroa edwardsi (Olliff, 1890)

== Sphinginae ==
- Agrius convolvuli (Linnaeus, 1758)
- Agrius godarti W.S. Macleay, 1826
- Leucomonia bethia (Kirby, 1877)
- Meganoton rufescens (Butler, 1875)
- Psilogramma argos Moulds & Lane, 1999
- Psilogramma casuarinae (Walker, 1856) (previously misidentified as Psilogramma menephron (Cramer, 1780))
- Psilogramma increta (Walker, 1865)
- Psilogramma exigua Brechlin, Lane & Kitching, 2010
- Psilogramma koalae Eitschberger, 2001
- Psilogramma gloriosa Eitschberger, 2001
- Psilogramma maxmouldsi Eitschberger, 2001
- Psilogramma nebulosa Butler, 1876
- Psilogramma papuensis Brechlin, 2001
- Psilogramma penumbra Lane, Moulds & Tuttle, 2011
