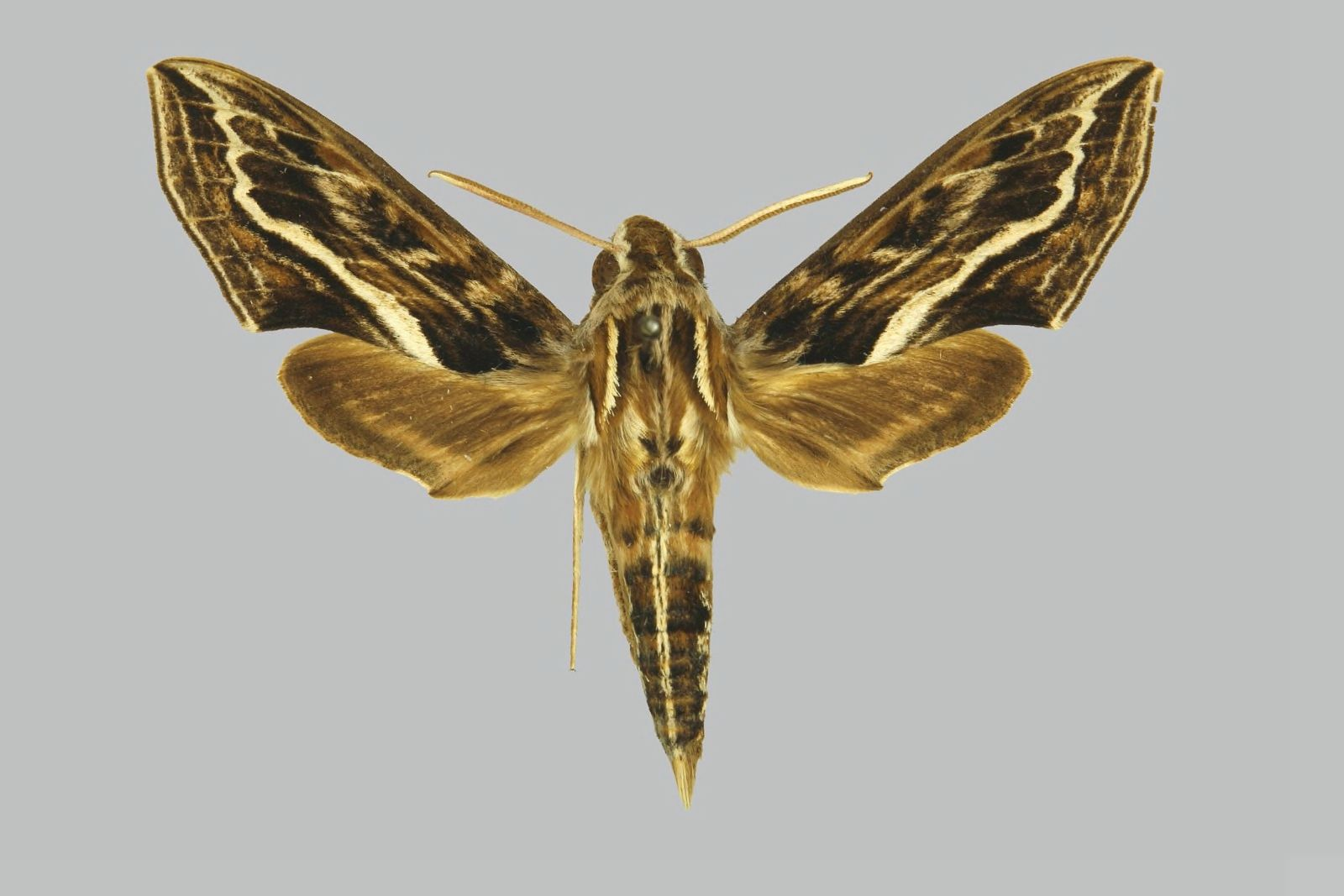

Scientific classification
- Kingdom: Animalia
- Phylum: Arthropoda
- Class: Insecta
- Order: Lepidoptera
- Family: Sphingidae
- Genus: Theretra
- Species: T. insignis

Binomial name
- Theretra insignis (Butler, 1882)

Synonyms
- Panacra insignis Butler, 1882

= Theretra insignis =

Species of moth

Theretra insignis is a moth of the family Sphingidae. It is known from Indonesia.

It is very similar to Theretra kuehni but larger and the forewings are more pointed. The upperside of the abdomen has two strong white dorsal lines, sometimes partly fused. The forewing upperside is similar to Theretra turneri but the space between the third and fifth postmedian lines is silvery-white and curved and the sixth postmedian line is only slightly dentate.
