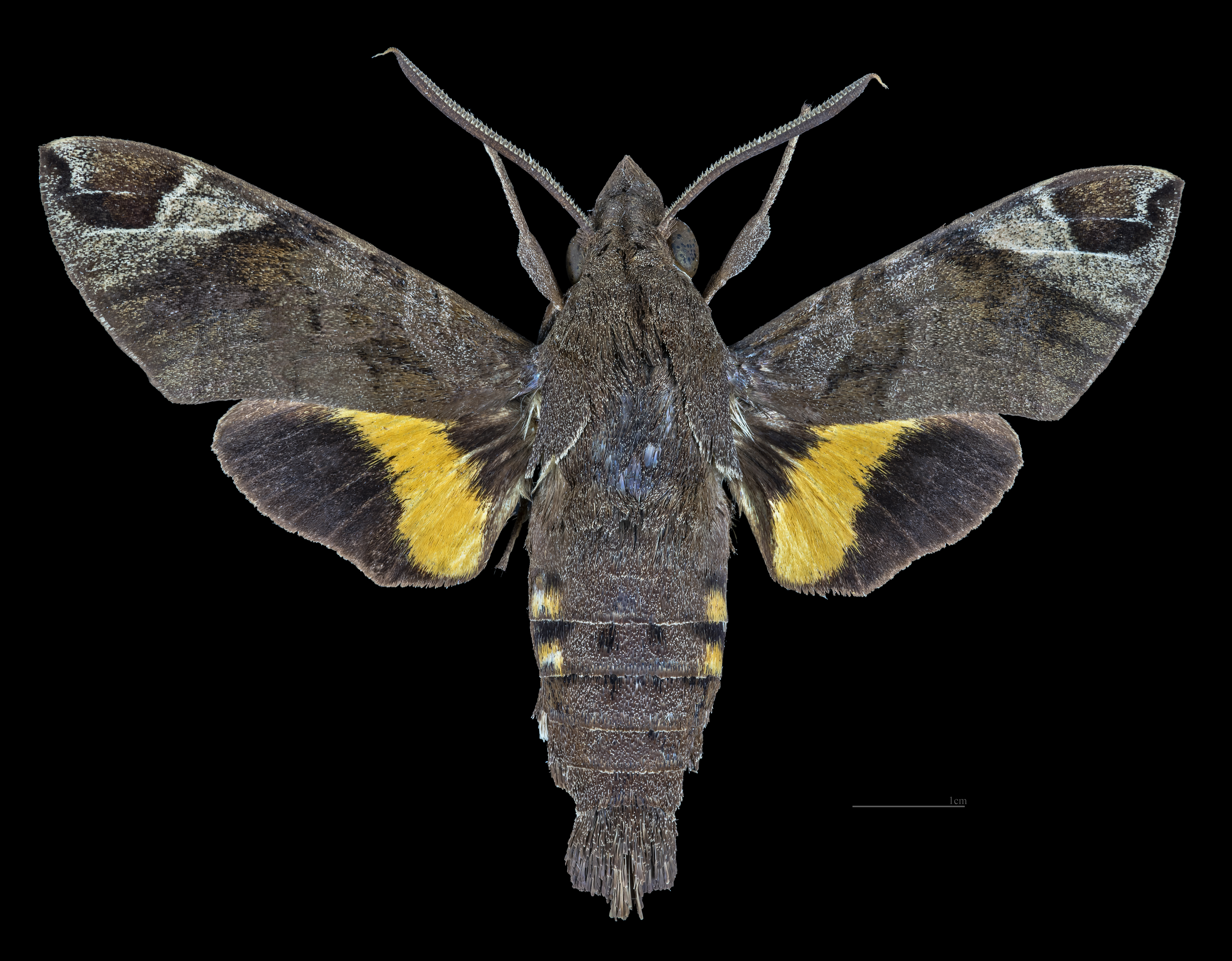
- Male dorsal
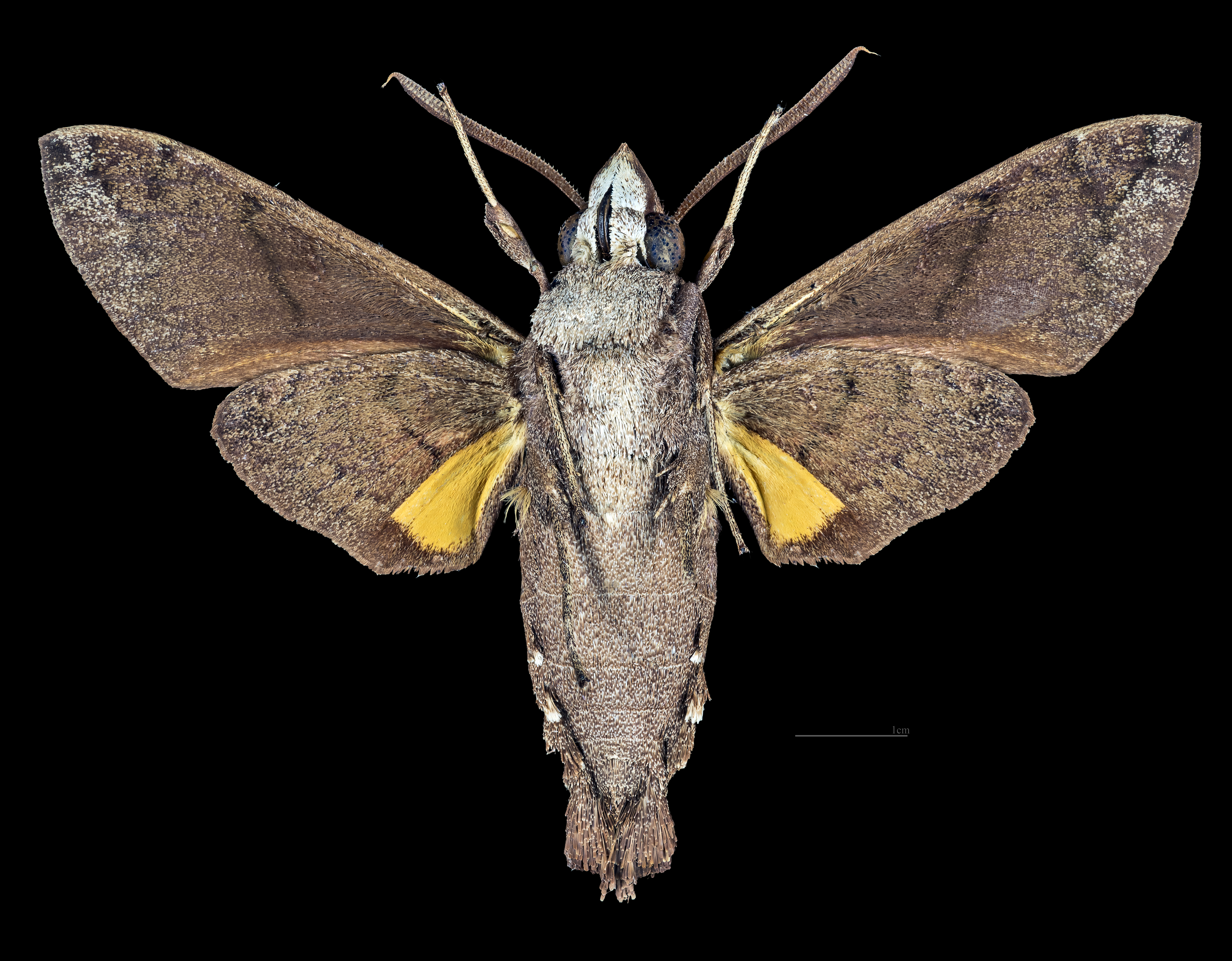
- Male ventral

Scientific classification
- Kingdom: Animalia
- Phylum: Arthropoda
- Clade: Pancrustacea
- Class: Insecta
- Order: Lepidoptera
- Family: Sphingidae
- Genus: Macroglossum
- Species: M. nubilum

Binomial name
- Macroglossum nubilum Rothschild & Jordan, 1903

= Macroglossum nubilum =

Species of moth

Macroglossum nubilum is a moth of the family Sphingidae. It is known to inhabit Queensland, Papua New Guinea and the Louisiade Archipelago.

It is similar to Macroglossum prometheus lineata.
