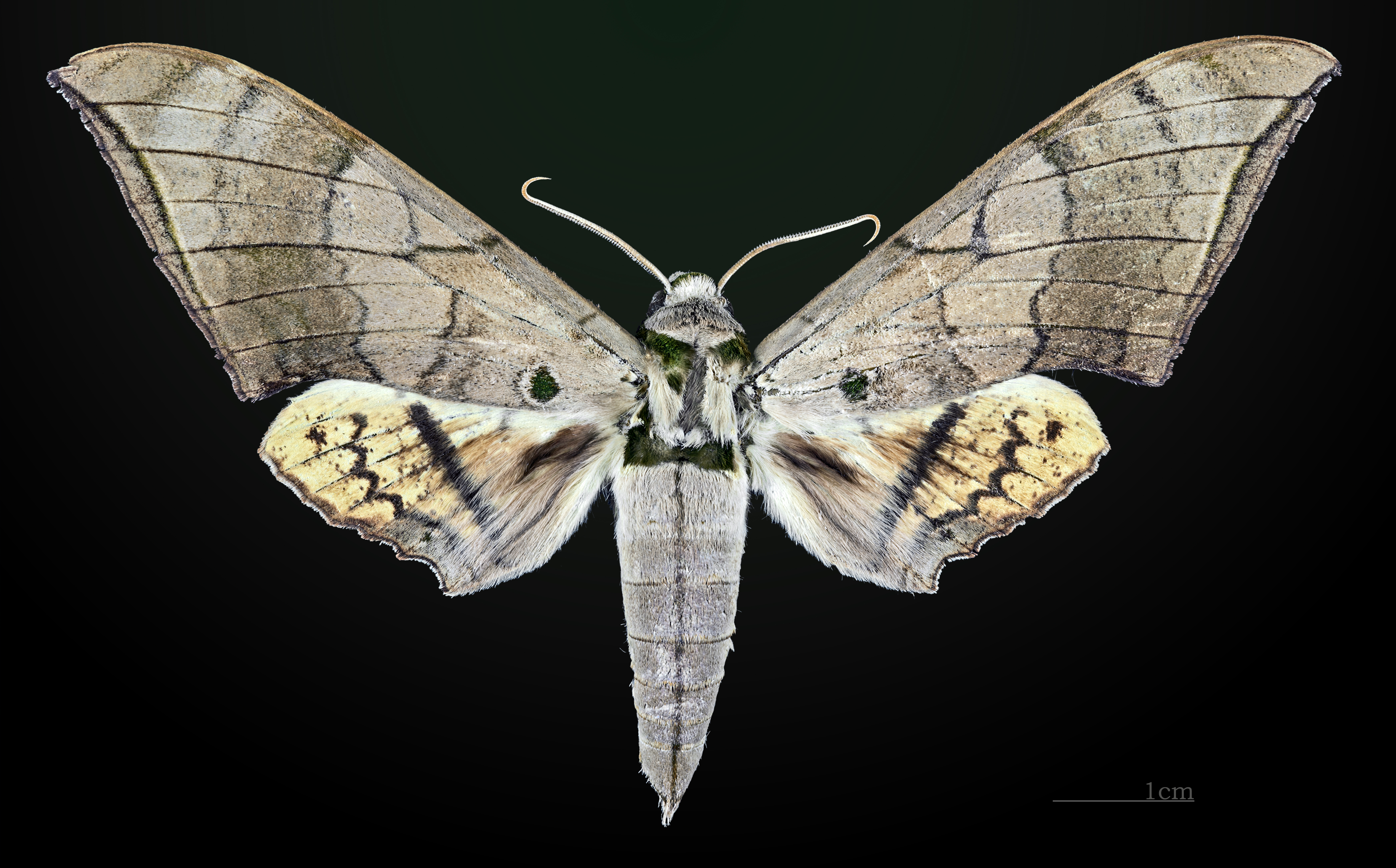
- Ambulyx wildei dorsal
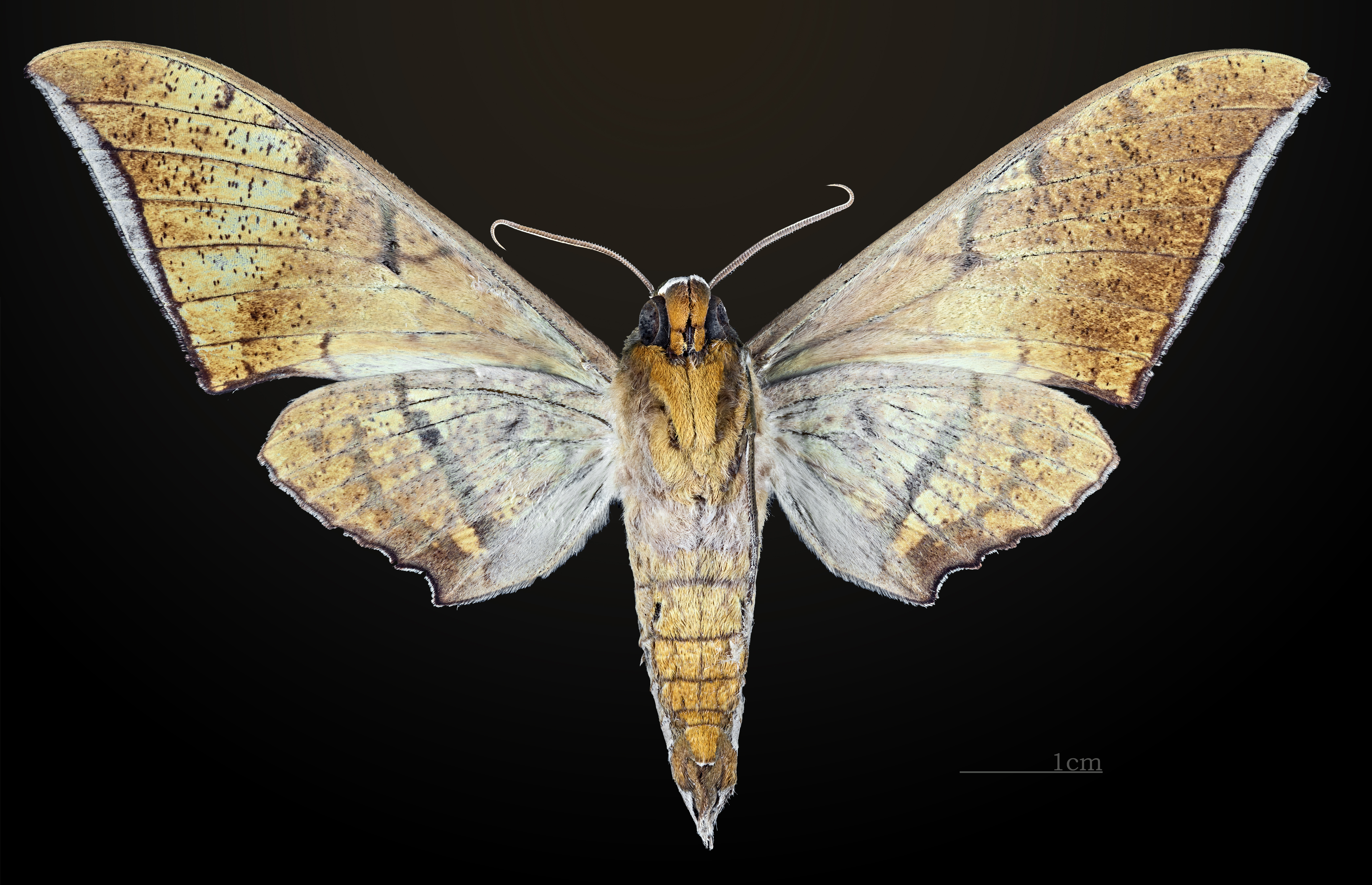
- Ambulyx wildei ventral

Scientific classification
- Kingdom: Animalia
- Phylum: Arthropoda
- Class: Insecta
- Order: Lepidoptera
- Family: Sphingidae
- Genus: Ambulyx
- Species: A. wildei

Binomial name
- Ambulyx wildei Miskin, 1891

= Ambulyx wildei =

Species of moth

Ambulyx wildei is a species of moth of the family Sphingidae. It is known from Papua New Guinea and Queensland.

The wingspan is about 110 mm. It is similar to Ambulyx substrigilis but the submarginal line of the forewing upperside is running closer to the margin. Females are deeper brown than males.
