= Theretra kuehni =

Scientific classification
- Kingdom: Animalia
- Phylum: Arthropoda
- Class: Insecta
- Order: Lepidoptera
- Family: Sphingidae
- Genus: Theretra
- Species: T. kuehni

Binomial name
- Theretra kuehni Rothschild, 1900

Synonyms
- Chaerocampa insignis kuehni Rothschild, 1900; Theretra insignis kuehni; Hippotion jordani Huwe, 1906

Species of moth

Theretra kuehni is a moth of the family Sphingidae. It is known from Indonesia.

It is very similar to Theretra insignis but smaller and the forewings are less pointed. The forewing upperside is as in Theretra insignis, but the silvery-white band between the third and fifth postmedian lines is more strongly curved.
