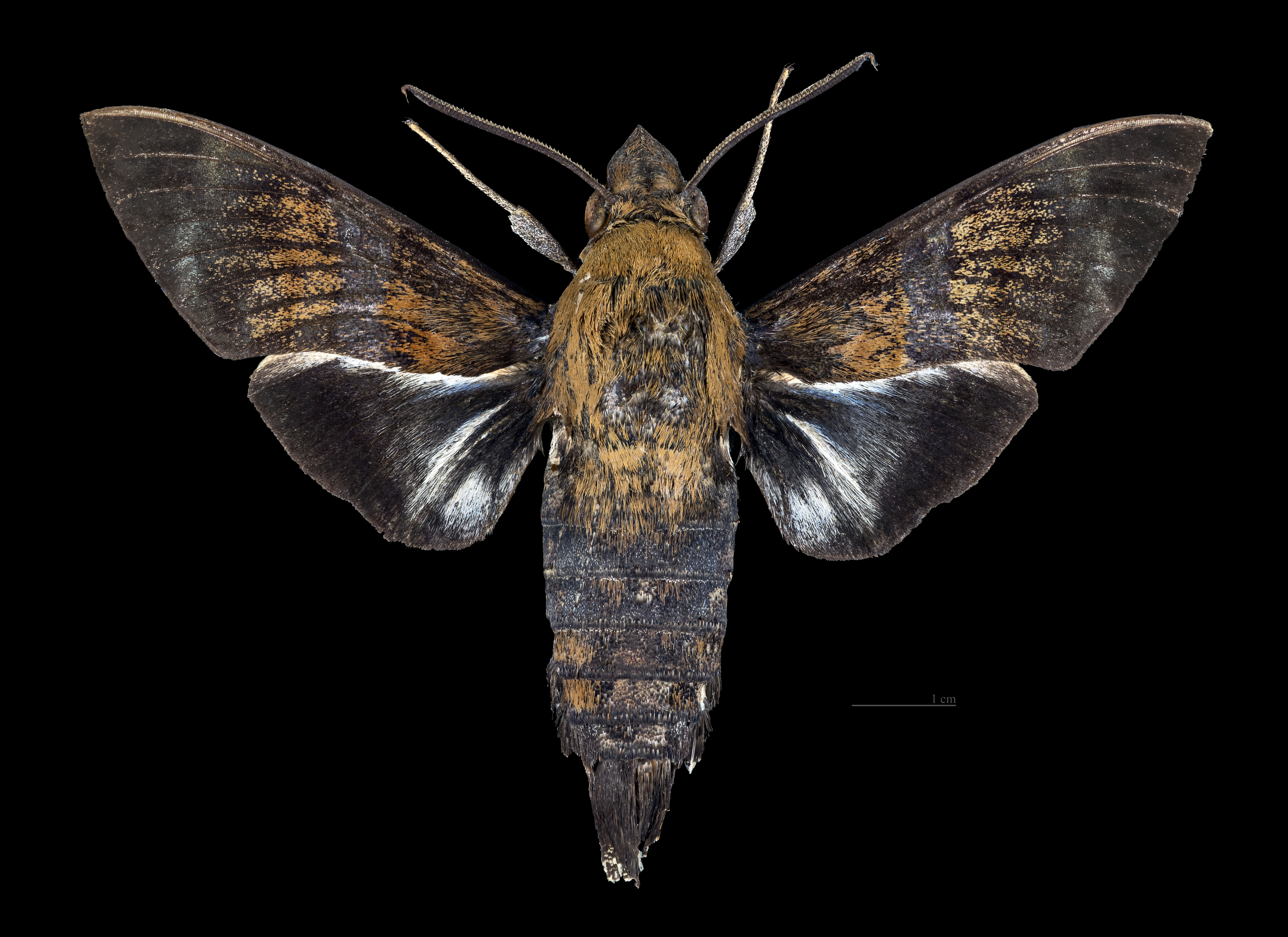
- Male dorsal
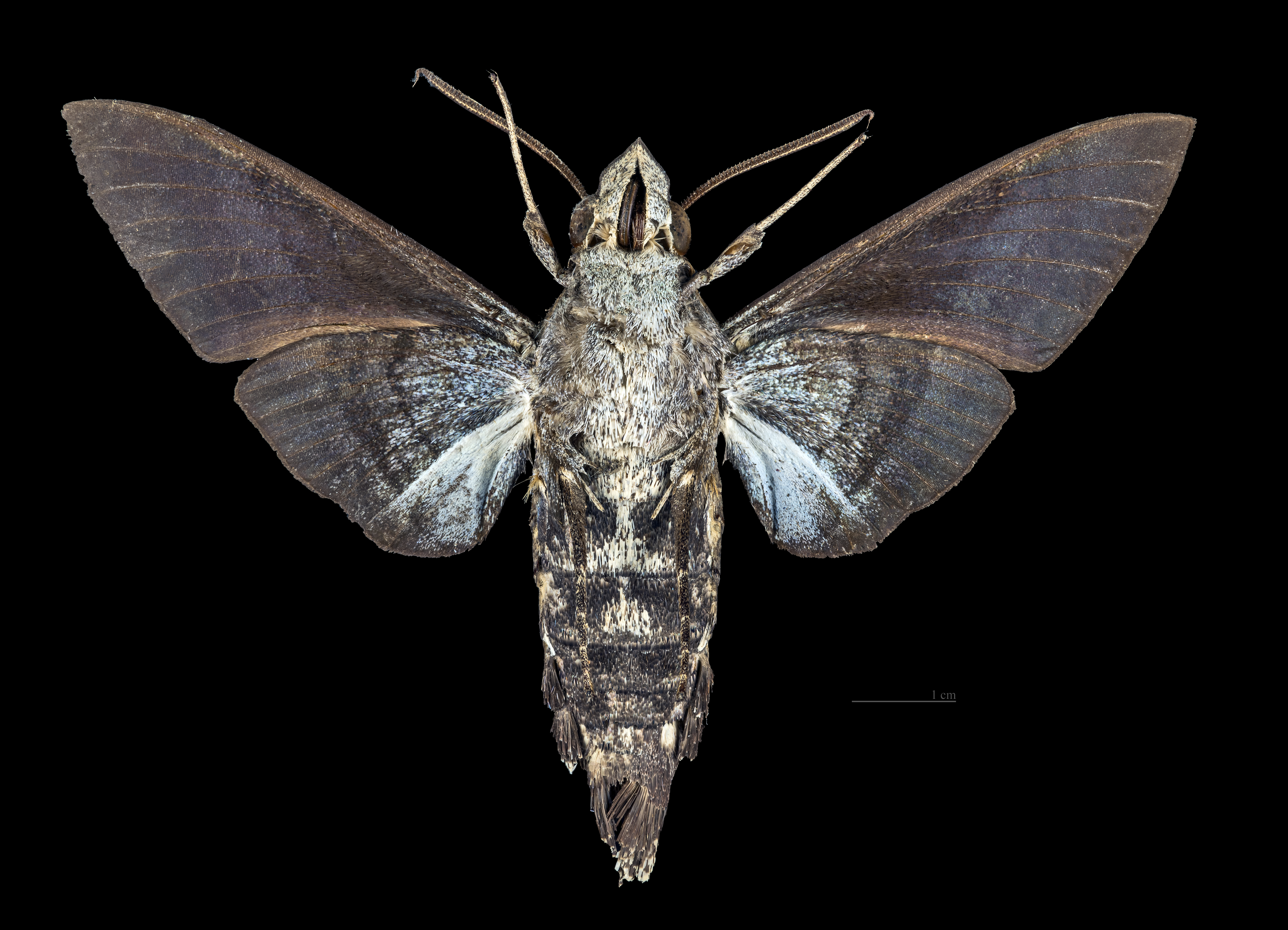
- Male ventral

Scientific classification
- Kingdom: Animalia
- Phylum: Arthropoda
- Clade: Pancrustacea
- Class: Insecta
- Order: Lepidoptera
- Family: Sphingidae
- Genus: Macroglossum
- Species: M. tenebrosa

Binomial name
- Macroglossum tenebrosa T. P. Lucas, 1891

Synonyms
- Macroglossa splendens Butler, 1892

= Macroglossum tenebrosa =

Species of moth

Macroglossum tenebrosa is a moth of the family Sphingidae first described by Thomas Pennington Lucas in 1891. It is known from Sulawesi, the Moluccas, Aru, Papua New Guinea, the Bismarck Archipelago, the Solomon Islands and north-eastern Australia.

The head and thorax uppersides are green. The abdomen upperside tergites are glossy bluish grey when side lit, apart from some black patches. There are no white side patches. The tips of the lateral tufts are white. The scales of the anal brush are usually tipped with buffish white, but sometimes largely black with the tips faintly tawny, sometimes all black in specimens from Queensland. The underside of both wings is bluish white basally. The hindwing upperside is bluish white near the anal angle, with a bluish-white streak.

The larvae are white with brown stripes and have a yellow head and thorax. The tail-spike is long and black, and curves forward. The true legs are black and the prolegs are yellow with black tips.
