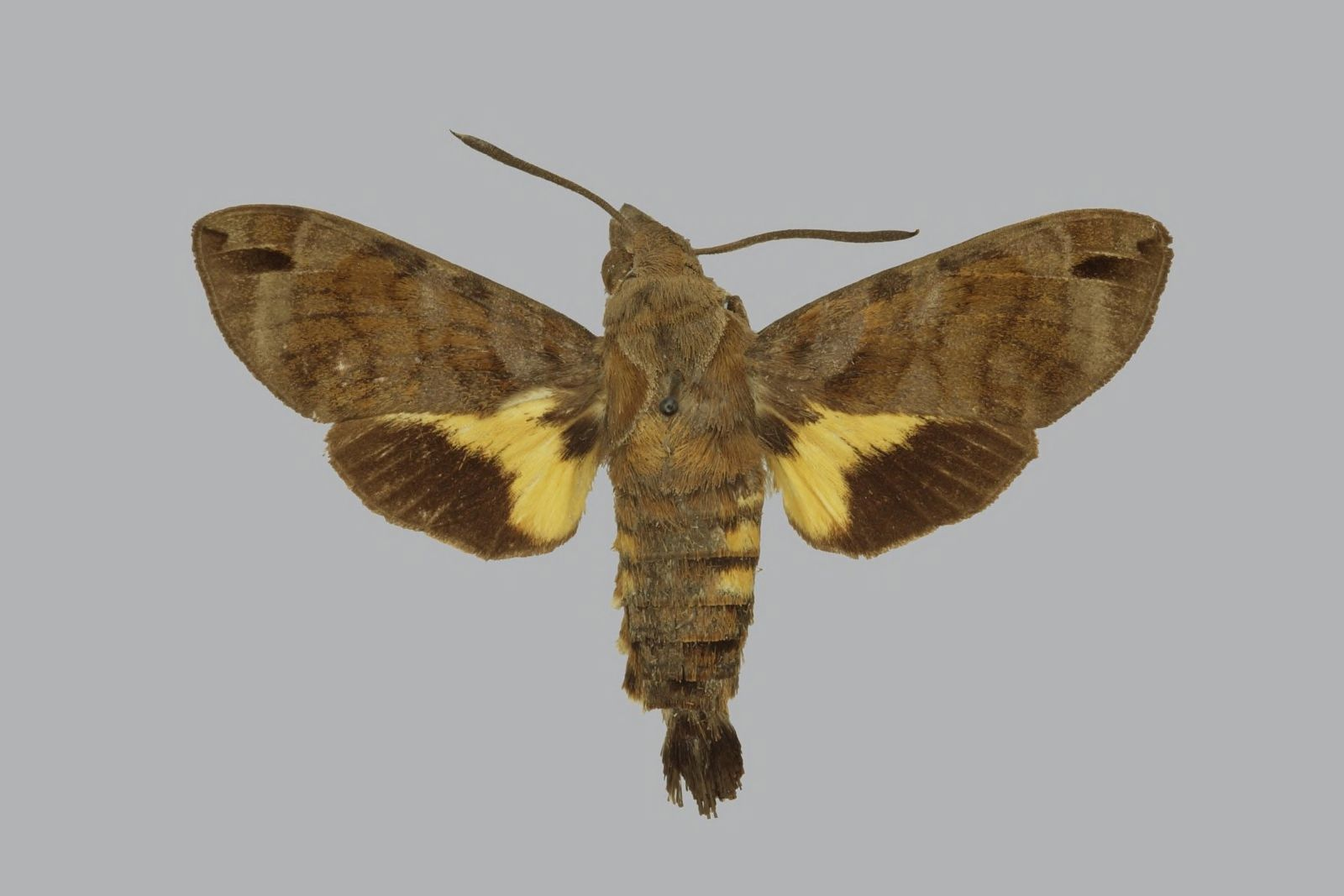
- Male

Scientific classification
- Kingdom: Animalia
- Phylum: Arthropoda
- Class: Insecta
- Order: Lepidoptera
- Family: Sphingidae
- Genus: Macroglossum
- Species: M. alcedo

Binomial name
- Macroglossum alcedo Boisduval, 1832

Synonyms
- Psithyros alcedo

= Macroglossum alcedo =

Species of moth

Macroglossum alcedo is a moth of the family Sphingidae. It is known from Tanimbar, the Kai Islands, Aru, Papua New Guinea and Queensland.

Adults have brown patterned forewings and smaller yellow hindwings with a wide dark brown margin.
