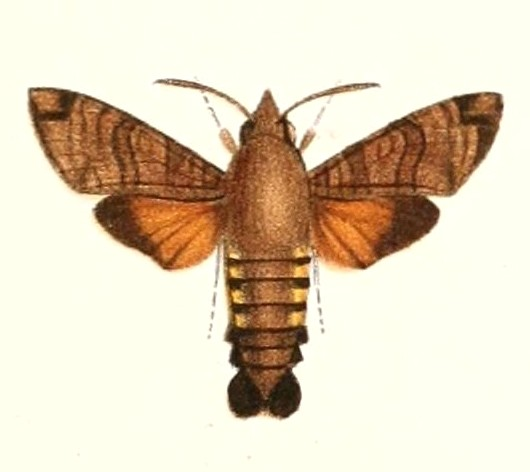

Scientific classification
- Kingdom: Animalia
- Phylum: Arthropoda
- Clade: Pancrustacea
- Class: Insecta
- Order: Lepidoptera
- Family: Sphingidae
- Genus: Macroglossum
- Species: M. vacillans

Binomial name
- Macroglossum vacillans Walker

= Macroglossum vacillans =

Species of moth

Macroglossum vacillans is a moth of the family Sphingidae. It is known from Western Australia, the Northern Territory, Queensland and Indonesia.

Adults are brown with a broad red band across each hindwing.
