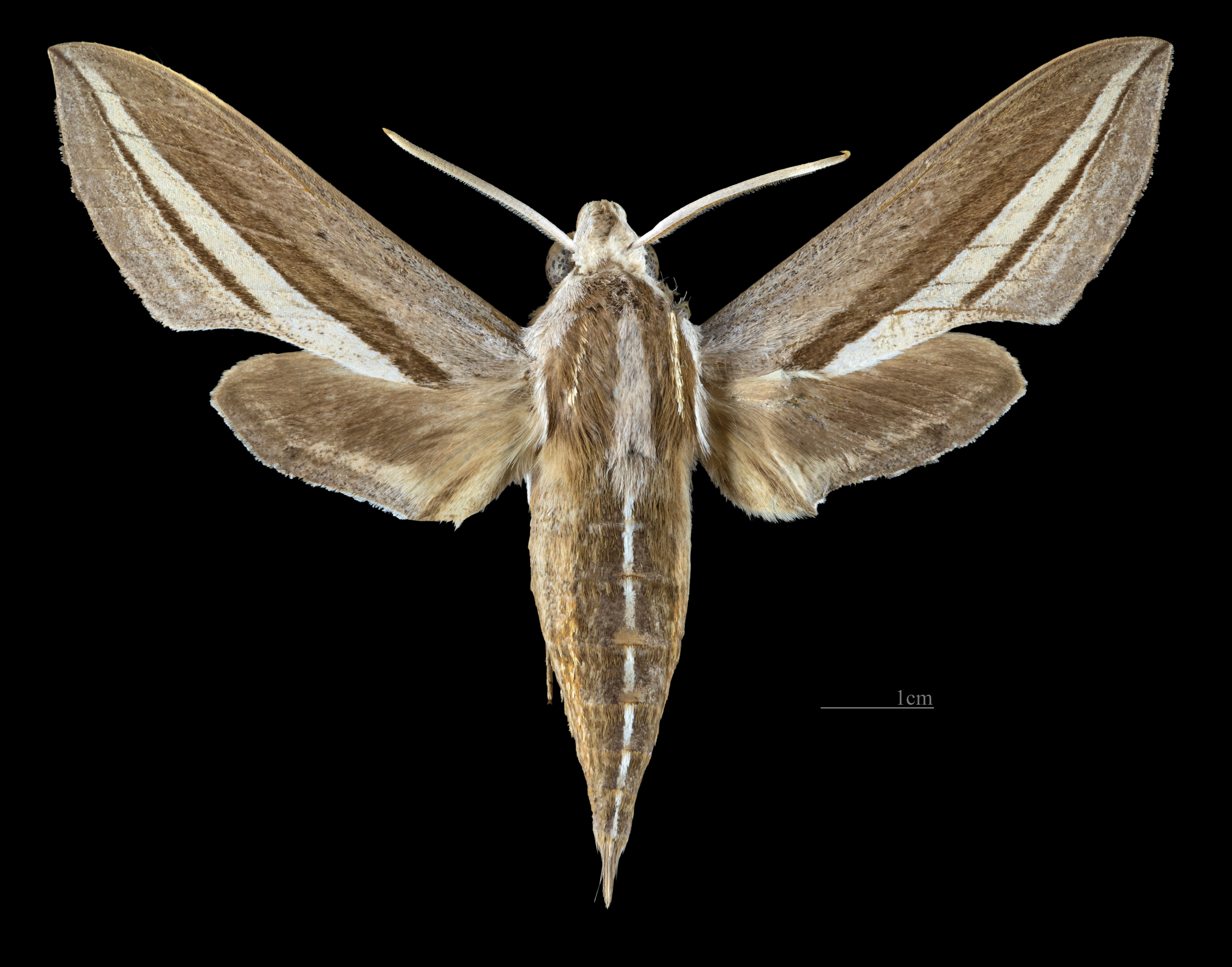
- Male dorsal
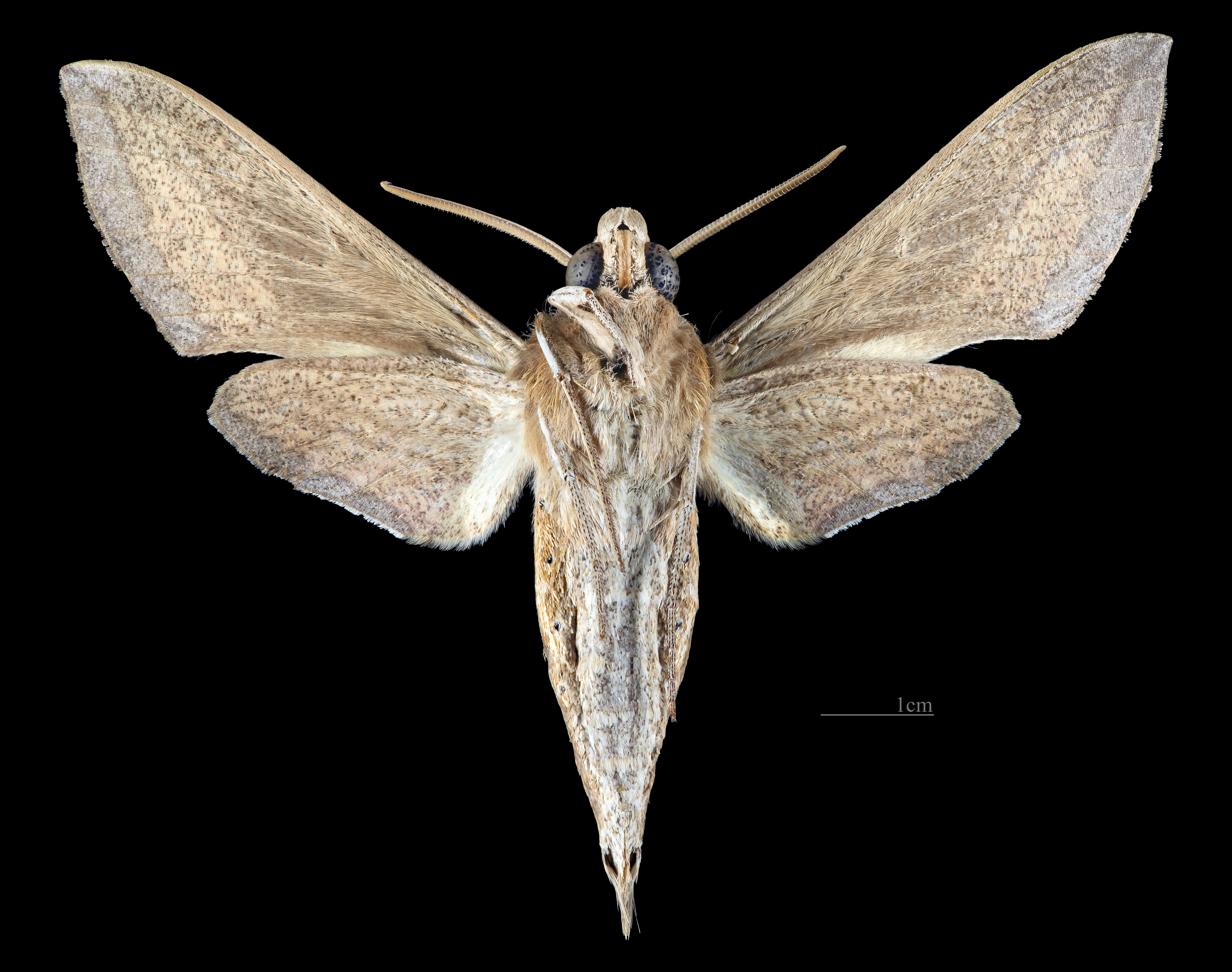
- Male ventral

Scientific classification
- Kingdom: Animalia
- Phylum: Arthropoda
- Class: Insecta
- Order: Lepidoptera
- Family: Sphingidae
- Genus: Theretra
- Species: T. margarita

Binomial name
- Theretra margarita (Kirby, 1877)

Synonyms
- Chaerocampa margarita Kirby, 1877

= Theretra margarita =

Species of moth

Theretra margarita is a moth of the family Sphingidae.

== Distribution ==
It is known from the Northern Territory, Western Australia and Queensland.
