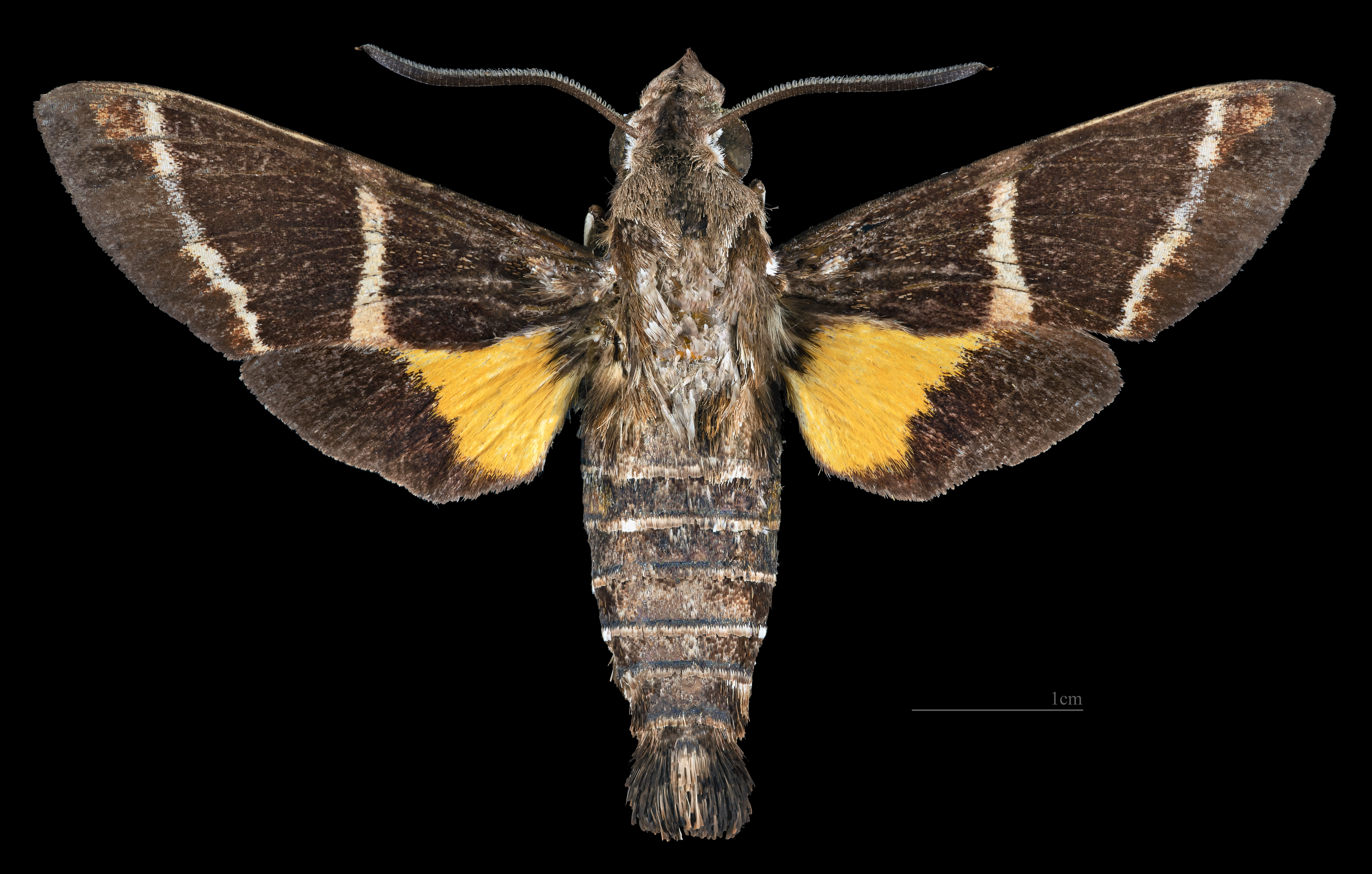
- Macroglossum dohertyi dohertyi Male dorsal
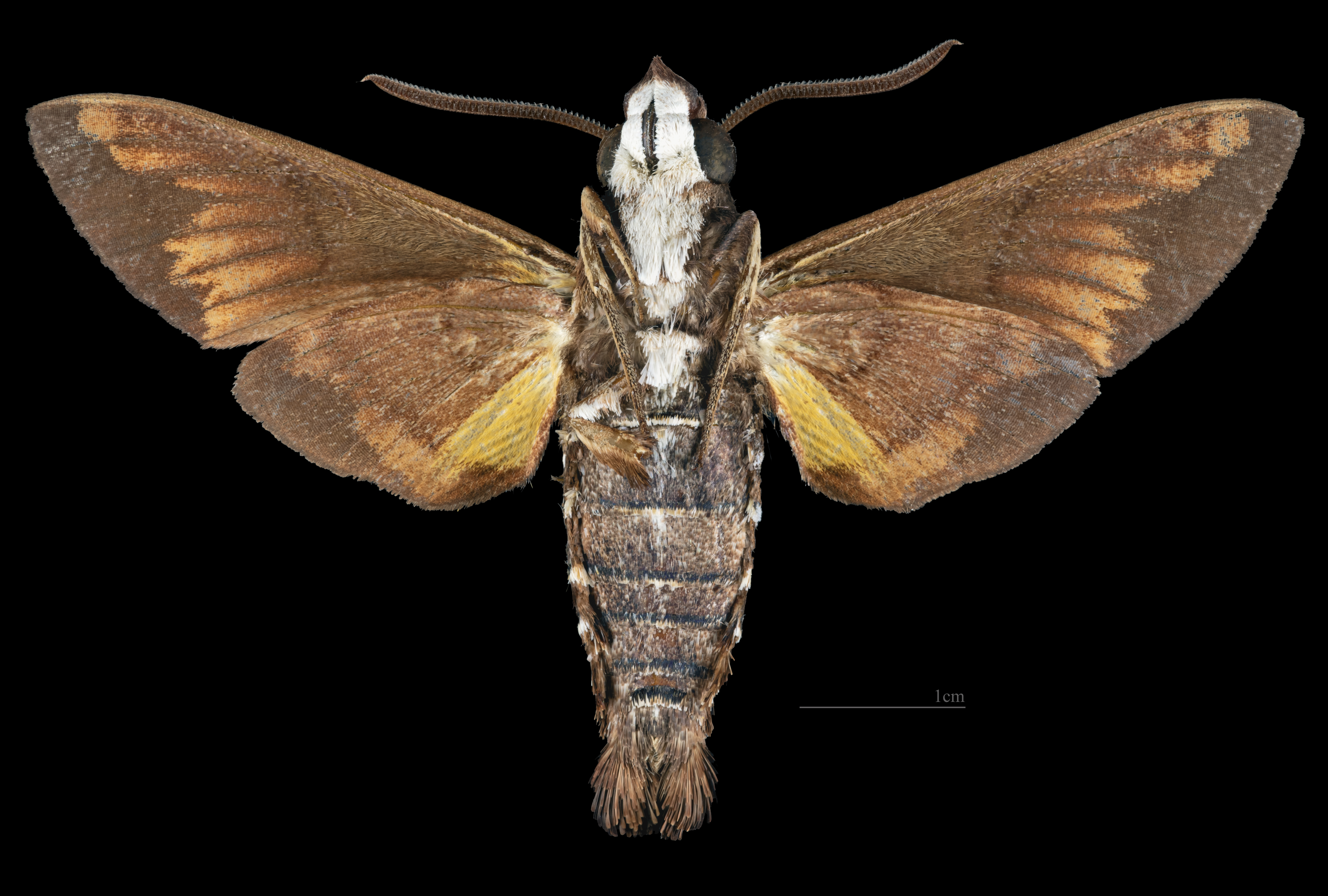
- Macroglossum dohertyi dohertyi Male ventral

Scientific classification
- Kingdom: Animalia
- Phylum: Arthropoda
- Class: Insecta
- Order: Lepidoptera
- Family: Sphingidae
- Genus: Macroglossum
- Species: M. dohertyi

Binomial name
- Macroglossum dohertyi Rothschild, 1894

Synonyms
- Bombylia doddi; Macroglossum dohertyi melanura Jordan, 1926

= Macroglossum dohertyi =

Species of moth

Macroglossum dohertyi is a moth of the family Sphingidae. It is known from Queensland and Papua New Guinea.

This species is distinguished from other Macroglossum species by the presence on the forewing upperside of two narrow, sharply defined, buffish-white bands in the place of the space between the median lines and the grey postdiscal line. The forewings are brown and the hindwings are dark yellow with a broad brown margin.

== Subspecies ==
- Macroglossum dohertyi dohertyi
- Macroglossum dohertyi doddi Clark, 1922 (Papua New Guinea)
