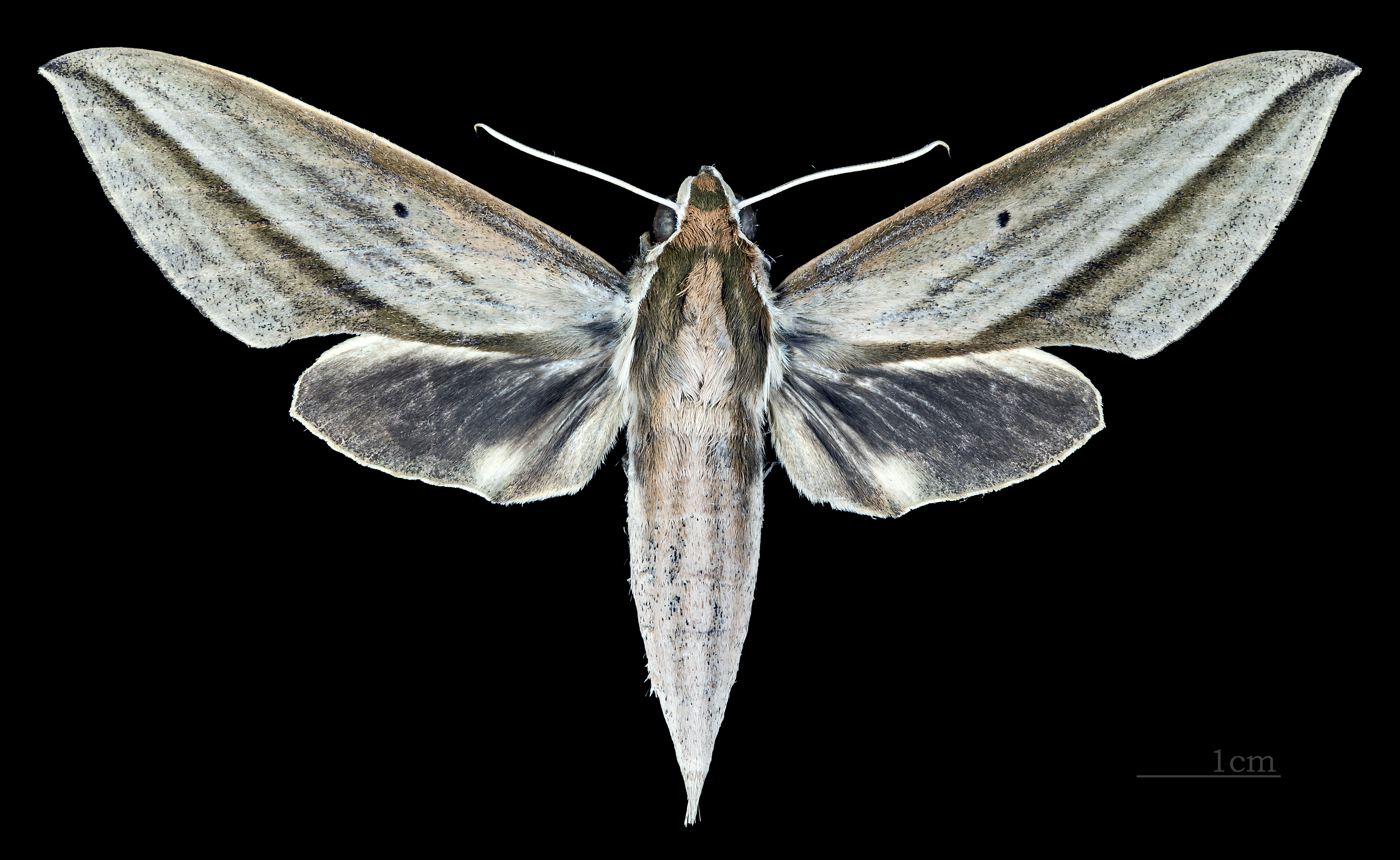
- Dorsal view
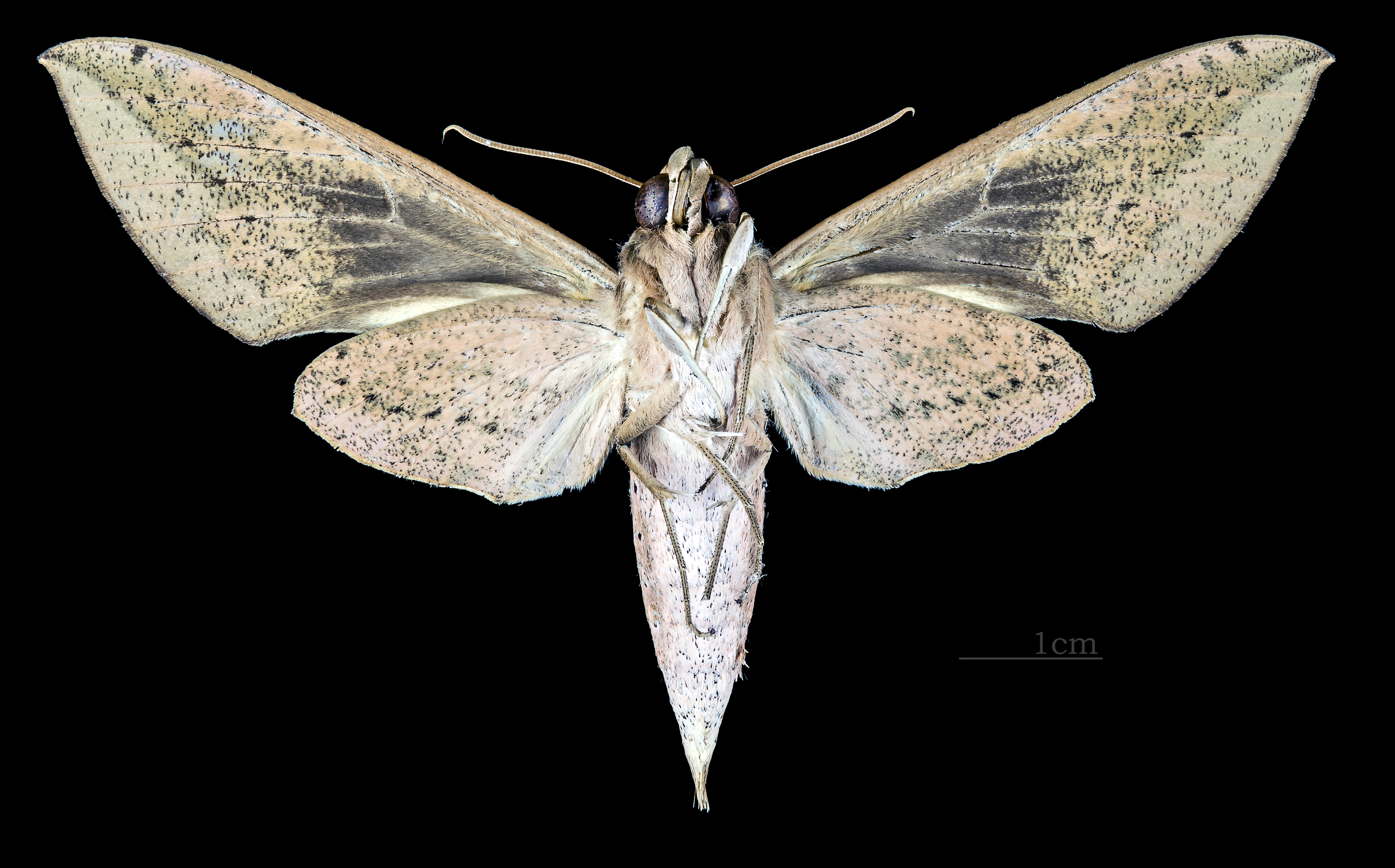
- Ventral view

Scientific classification
- Kingdom: Animalia
- Phylum: Arthropoda
- Clade: Pancrustacea
- Class: Insecta
- Order: Lepidoptera
- Family: Sphingidae
- Genus: Theretra
- Species: T. queenslandi

Binomial name
- Theretra queenslandi (T. P. Lucas, 1891)

Synonyms
- Chaerocampa queenslandi T. P. Lucas, 1891; Choerocampa potentia H. Druce, 1894

= Theretra queenslandi =

Species of moth

Theretra queenslandi is a moth of the family Sphingidae first described by Thomas Pennington Lucas in 1891.

== Distribution ==
It is known from New South Wales, Queensland in Australia and from Papua-New-Guinea.

== Description ==
The wingspan is about 60 mm.
