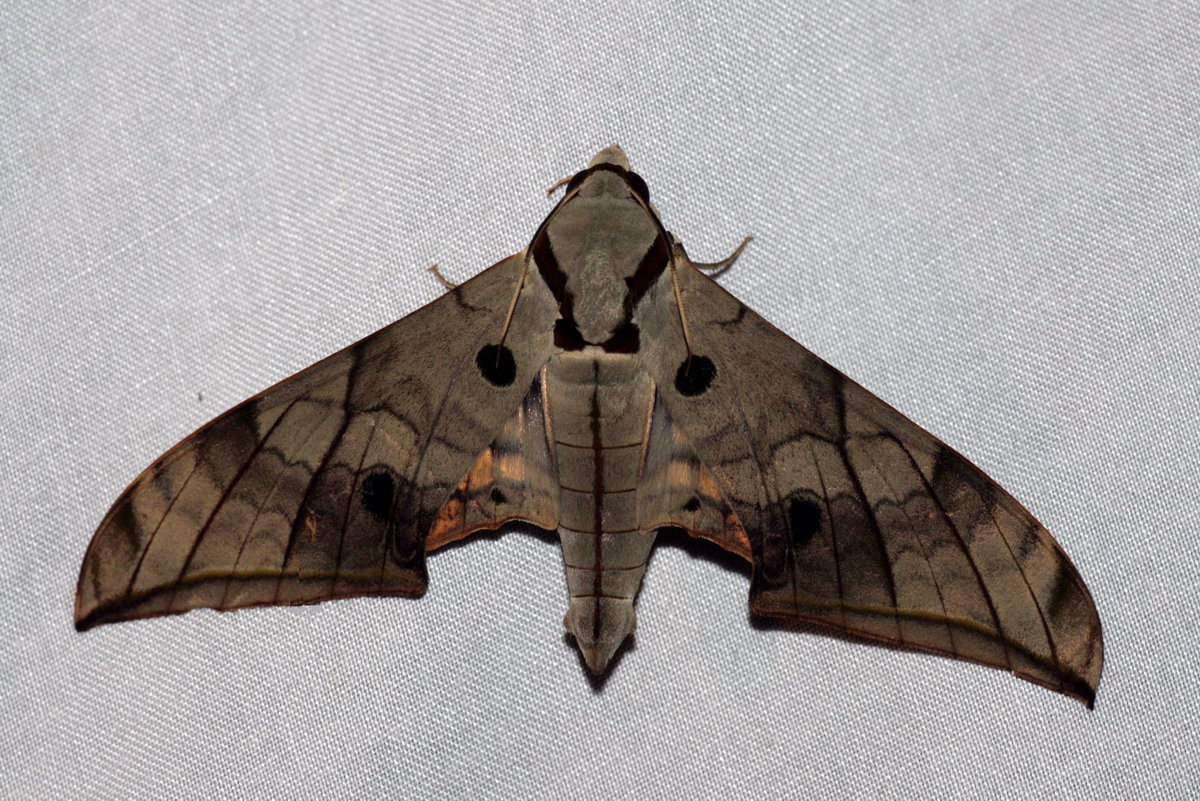

Scientific classification
- Kingdom: Animalia
- Phylum: Arthropoda
- Class: Insecta
- Order: Lepidoptera
- Family: Sphingidae
- Genus: Ambulyx
- Species: A. substrigilis

Binomial name
- Ambulyx substrigilis Westwood, 1847

Synonyms
- Ambulyx philemon Boisduval, 1870; Ambulyx substrigilis cana Gehlen, 1940; Oxyambulyx sericeipennis subrufescens Clark, 1936; Oxyambulyx substrigilis brooksi Clark, 1923; Oxyambulyx substrigilis aglaia Jordan, 1923

= Ambulyx substrigilis =

Dark-based gliding hawkmoth

Species of moth

Ambulyx substrigilis, the dark-based gliding hawkmoth, is a species of moth of the family Sphingidae. It was described by John O. Westwood in 1847.

== Distribution ==
It is known from Sri Lanka, India, Nepal, Bangladesh, the Andaman Islands, the Nicobar Islands, Thailand, Vietnam, China (Hainan Island), Malaysia (Peninsular, Sarawak), Indonesia (Sumatra, Kalimantan) and the Philippines.

== Description ==
The wingspan is 96–120 mm.

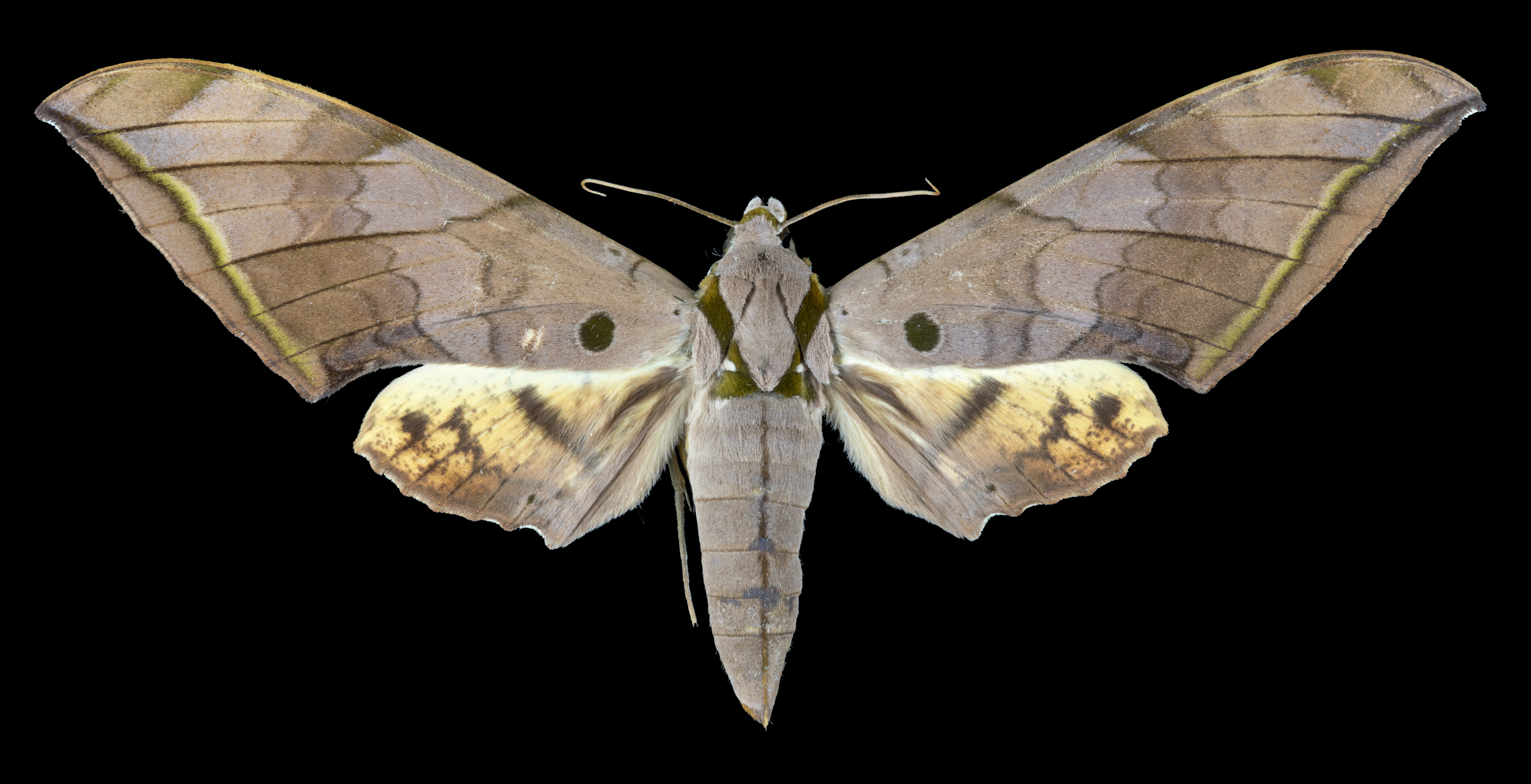
Female dorsal view
(from the collection of the MHNT)

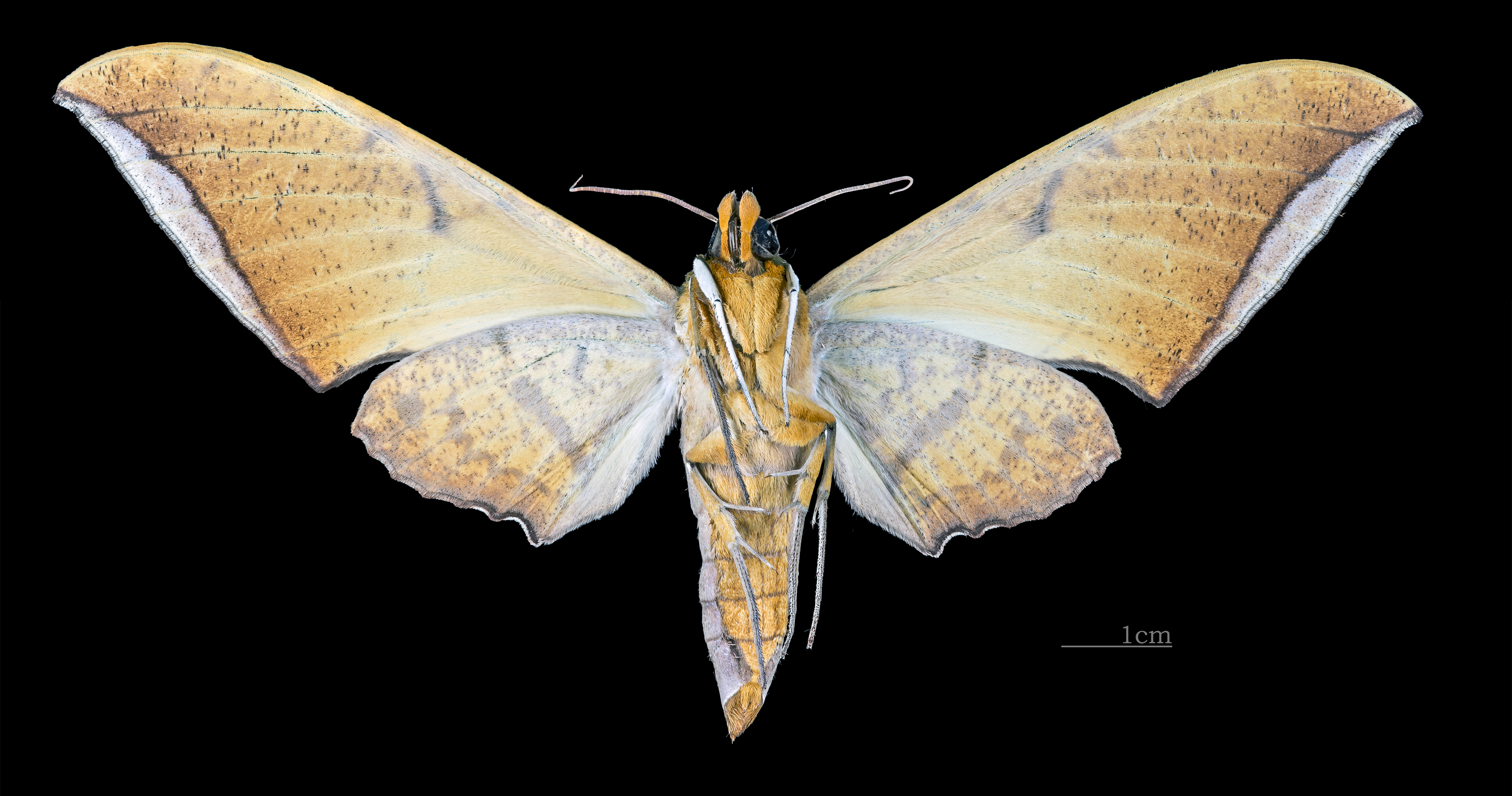
Female ventral view
(coll. MHNT)

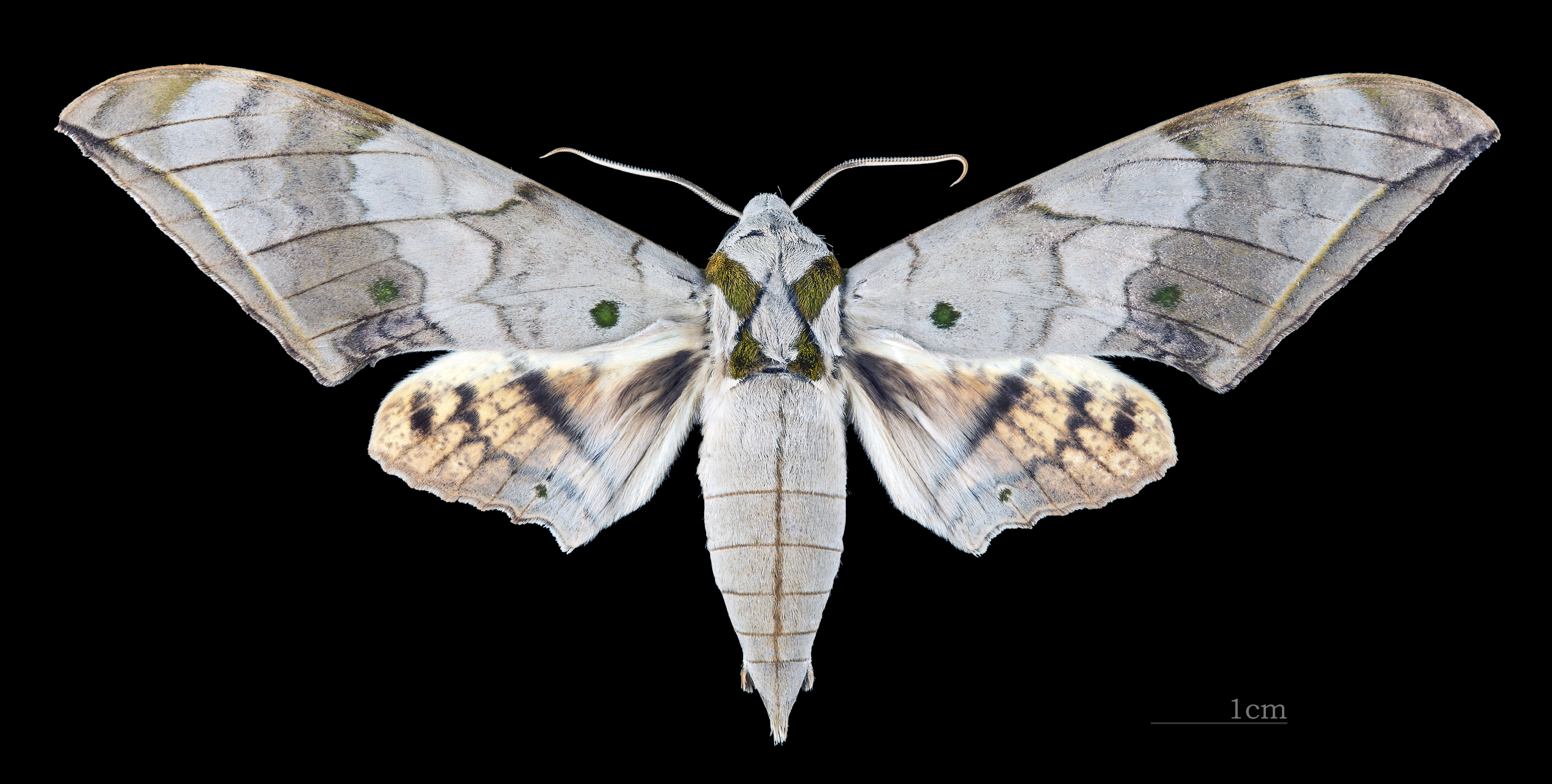
Male dorsal view
(coll. MHNT)

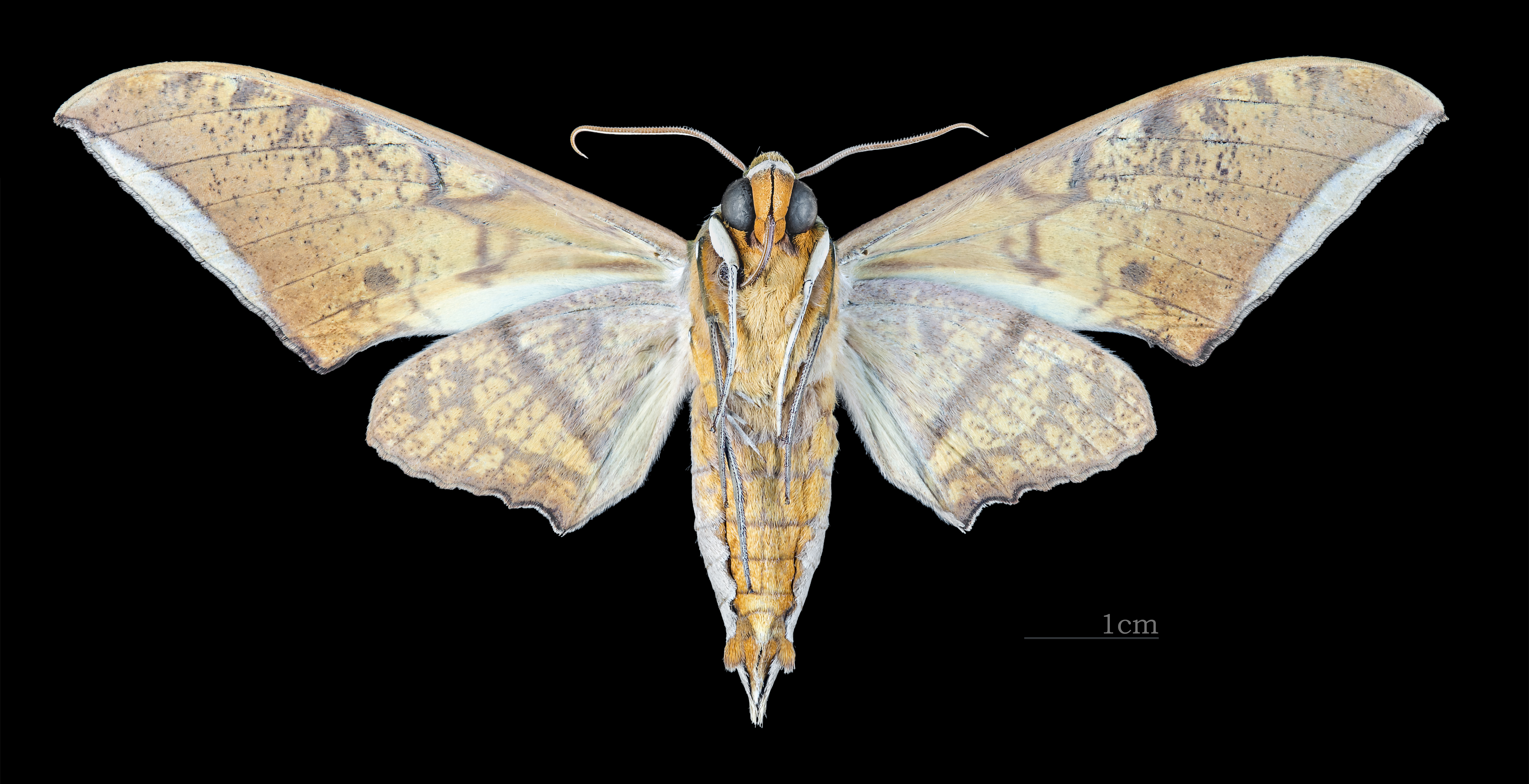
Male ventral view
(coll. MHNT)

== Biology ==
The larvae have been recorded feeding on Aglaia littoralis in India.

== Subspecies ==
- Ambulyx substrigilis substrigilis (Sri Lanka, India, Nepal, Bangladesh, Andaman and Nicobar Islands, Thailand, Vietnam, China (Hainan Island), Malaysia (Peninsular, Sarawak), Indonesia (Sumatra, Kalimantan), Philippines)
- Ambulyx substrigilis aglaia (Jordan, 1923) (India)

In The Fauna of British India, Including Ceylon and Burma: Moths Volume I, the species is described as follows:

The hind wing crenulate. Pale ochreous or greyish brown to purplish brown in color; an olive-green band between the antennae; lateral olive-green bands on the thorax meeting on metathorax; abdomen with two olive blotches on the fifth segment, and one on the seventh in some specimens; sides of palpi and pectus ferruginous; some specimens with a ferruginous line down the vertex of abdomen. Fore wing with a basal olive speck; a subbasal olive blotch on the costa, and another below the median nervure, the former being obsolete in some of the forms; two irregularly dentate, more or less obsolete antemedial lines, and two similar lunulate postmedial lines; a curved band from apex to outer angle, the inner part of which is light, the outer dark. Hind wing ochreous, mottled with fuscous; an erect medial, and curved more or less lunulate postmedial band; some specimens with the anal half of the margin dark. ... Larva pale green with darker granular spots; a white dorso-lateral line; pale yellow oblique streaks on 5th to 10th somites; horn purple with white granular spots.

— The Fauna of British India, Including Ceylon and Burma: Moths Volume I
