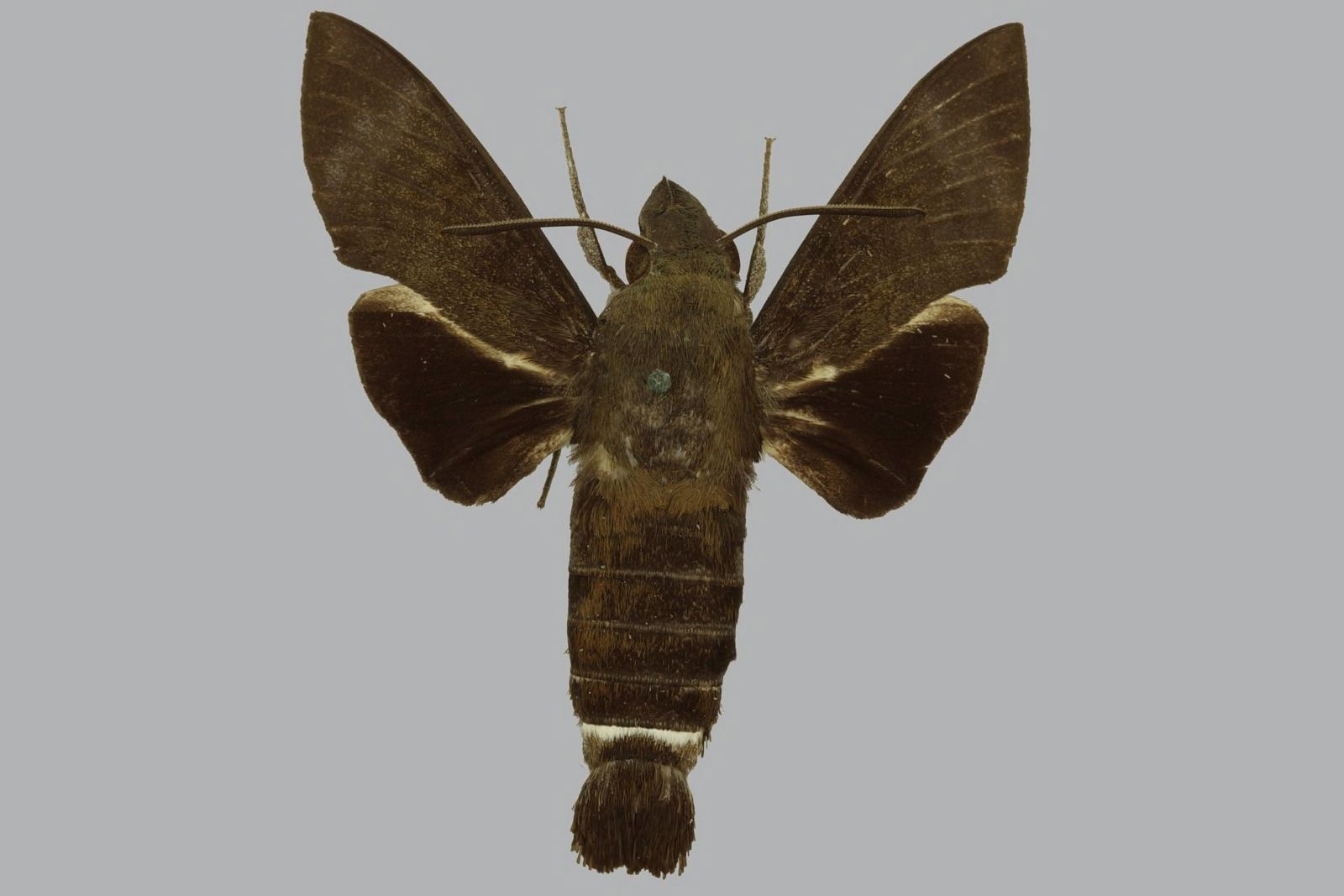

Scientific classification
- Kingdom: Animalia
- Phylum: Arthropoda
- Class: Insecta
- Order: Lepidoptera
- Family: Sphingidae
- Genus: Macroglossum
- Species: M. micacea

Binomial name
- Macroglossum micacea Walker, 1856

Synonyms
- Macroglossa ethus Boisduval, 1875; Macroglossa nox Newman, 1857

= Macroglossum micacea =

Species of moth

Macroglossum micacea is a moth of the family Sphingidae. It is known from the Solomon Islands, the D'Entrecasteaux Islands, Papua New Guinea and Queensland.

== Subspecies ==
- Macroglossum micacea micacea
- Macroglossum micacea albibase Rothschild, 1905 (Papua New Guinea, Solomon Islands, D'Entrecasteaux Islands)
