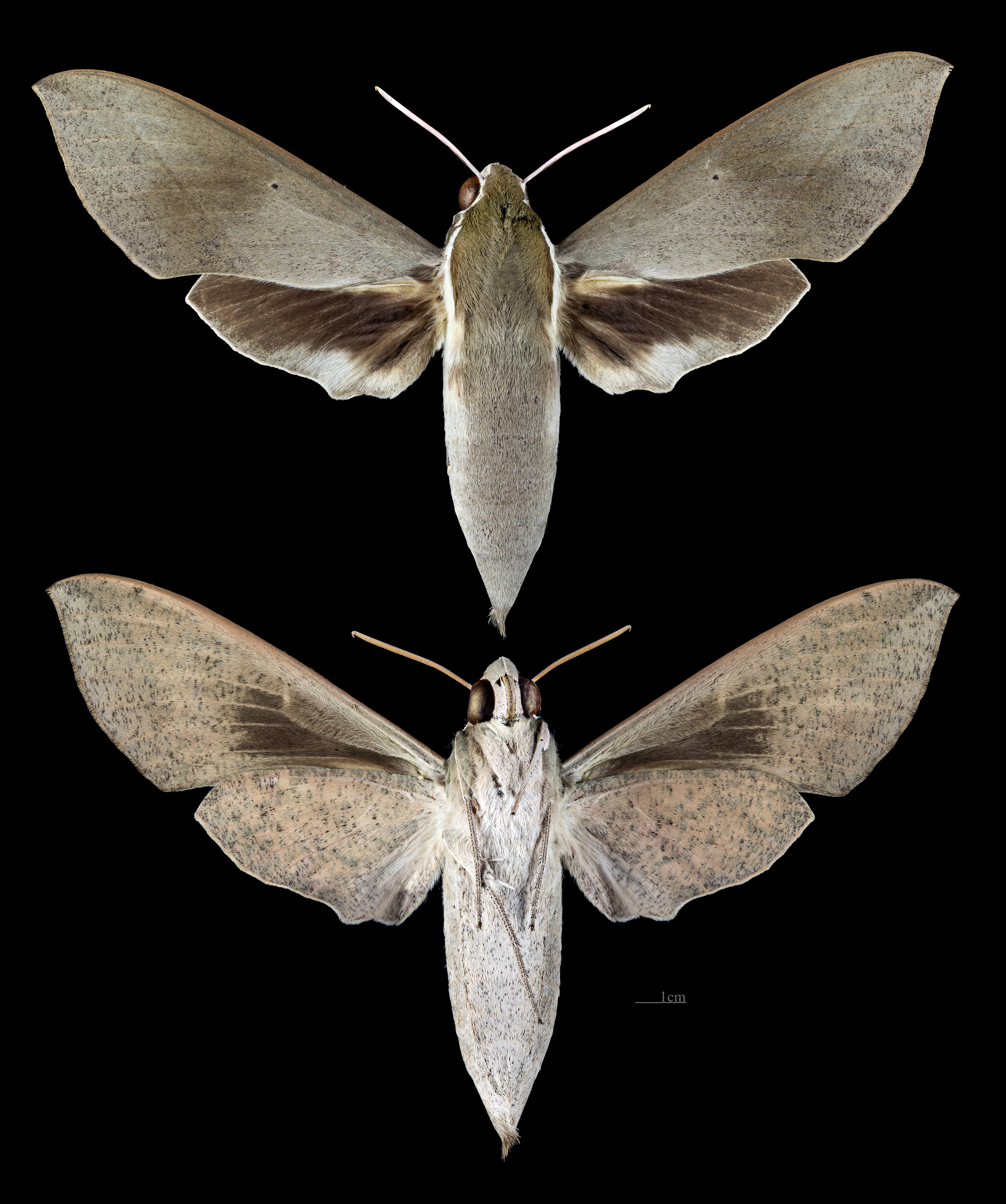

Scientific classification
- Kingdom: Animalia
- Phylum: Arthropoda
- Class: Insecta
- Order: Lepidoptera
- Family: Sphingidae
- Genus: Theretra
- Species: T. indistincta

Binomial name
- Theretra indistincta (Butler, 1877)

Synonyms
- Chaerocampa cleopatra Miskin, 1891; Chaerocampa curvilinea Lucas, 1891

= Theretra indistincta =

Species of moth

Theretra indistincta is a moth of the family Sphingidae. It is known from Queensland, Papua New Guinea, Indonesia and Bismarck Archipelago.

They have pink antennae. Pupation takes place in a mottled brown pupa.

== Subspecies ==
- Theretra indistincta indistincta (Queensland, Papua New Guinea, Indonesia)
- Theretra indistincta bismarcki Jordan, 1926 (Bismarck Archipelago)
- Theretra indistincta manuselensis Joicey & Talbot, 1921 (Ceram)
- Theretra indistincta papuensis Joicey & Talbot, 1921 (Papua New Guinea)
