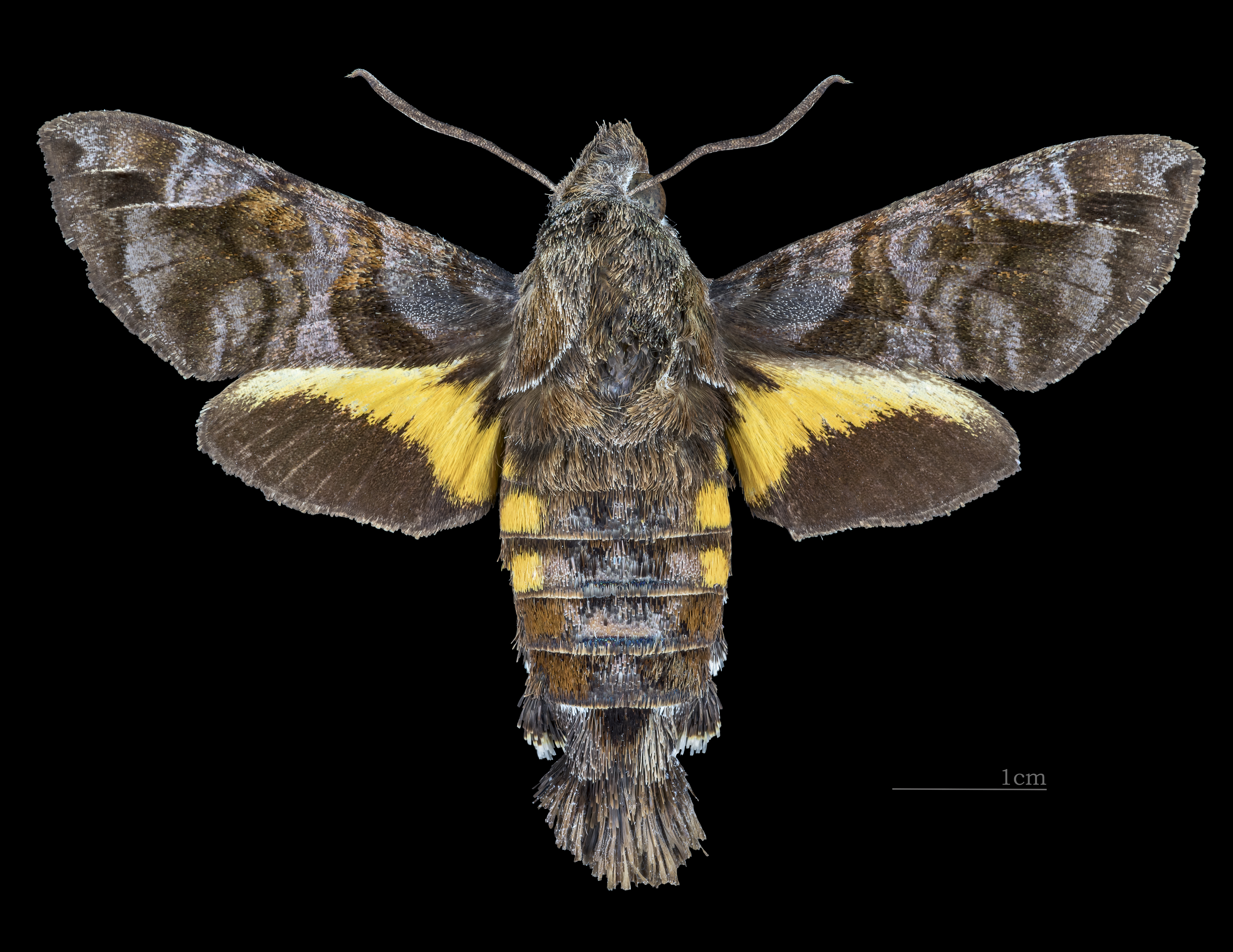
- Dorsal male
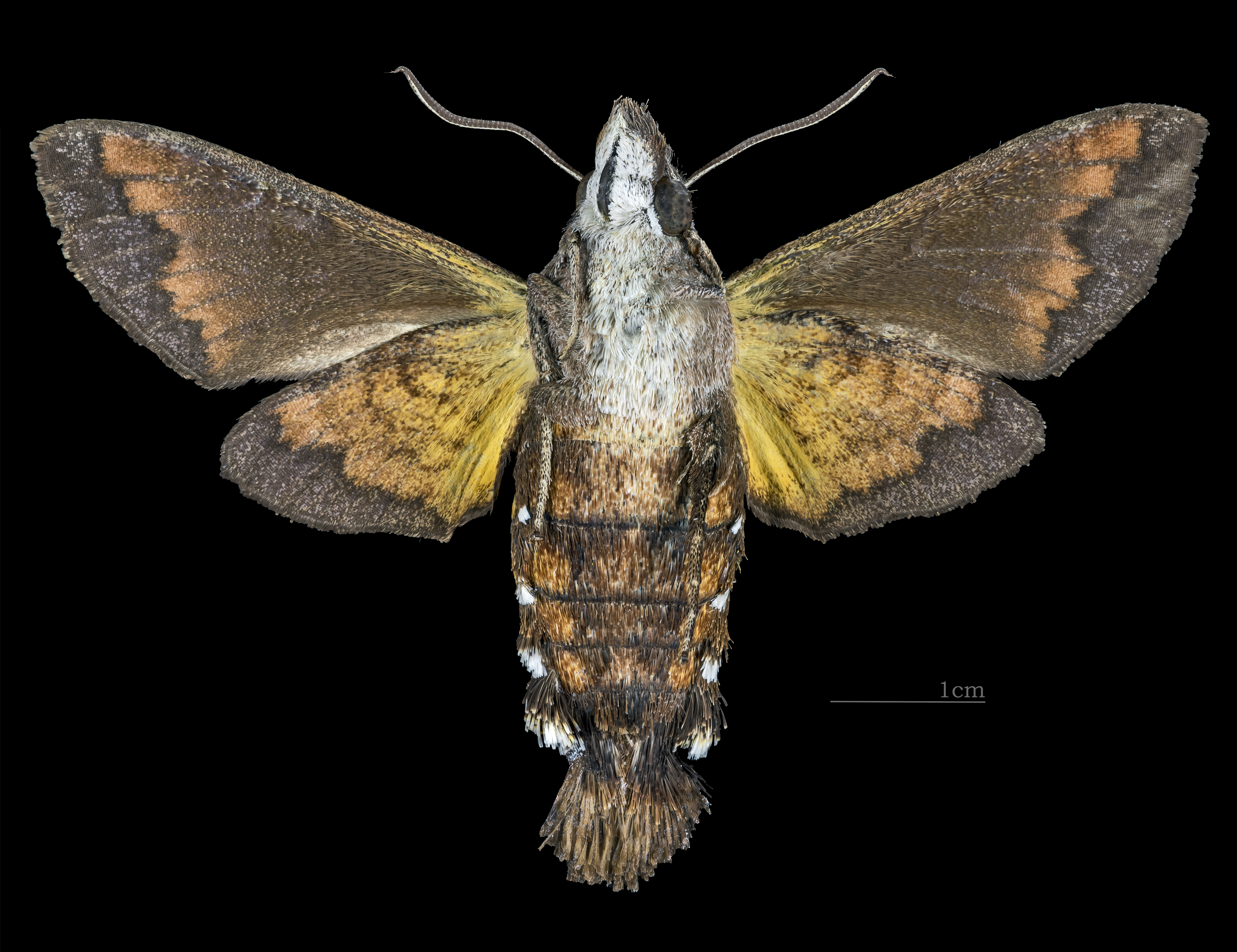
- Ventral male

Scientific classification
- Kingdom: Animalia
- Phylum: Arthropoda
- Class: Insecta
- Order: Lepidoptera
- Family: Sphingidae
- Genus: Macroglossum
- Species: M. insipida

Binomial name
- Macroglossum insipida Butler, 1875

Synonyms
- Macroglossa troglodytus Boisduval, 1875; Macroglossum insipida sinensis Mell, 1922

= Macroglossum insipida =

Hermit hummingbird hawkmoth

Species of moth

Macroglossum insipida, the hermit hummingbird hawkmoth, is a moth of the family Sphingidae. It was described by Arthur Gardiner Butler in 1875.

== Distribution ==
It is known from Sri Lanka, southern and eastern India, Nepal, Thailand, southern China, Taiwan, Japan (Ryukyu Archipelago), Vietnam, Malaysia (Peninsular, Sarawak), Indonesia (Sumatra, Java, Kalimantan), Papua New Guinea and Queensland.

== Description ==
The wingspan is 40–54 mm. Head and thorax are grey with a rufus line on the vertex. Abdomen greyish with yellow lateral bands on 2nd, 3rd, and 4th segments, and paired dark spots on the vertex. There are some darker marks on terminal segments. Anal tufts are greyish at base and black tipped. Thorax pale brown. Forewings are greyish with two indistinct subbasal lines. Antemedial is a curved dark band. Subapical markings are prominent and continue towards outer angle as a submarginal line. Hindwings have a yellow band constricted at middle. Ventral side of hindwings is with three transverse lines, of which there are traces on forewing as well. Larva pale red with purplish dots. A pale subdorsal line runs with dark margins. Dark lateral oblique stripes can be seen from 3rd to 10th somites. Horn is black. In the early instars, the larva is dull brown.

== Subspecies ==
- Macroglossum insipida insipida
- Macroglossum insipida papuanum Rothschild & Jordan, 1903 (Papua New Guinea and Queensland)
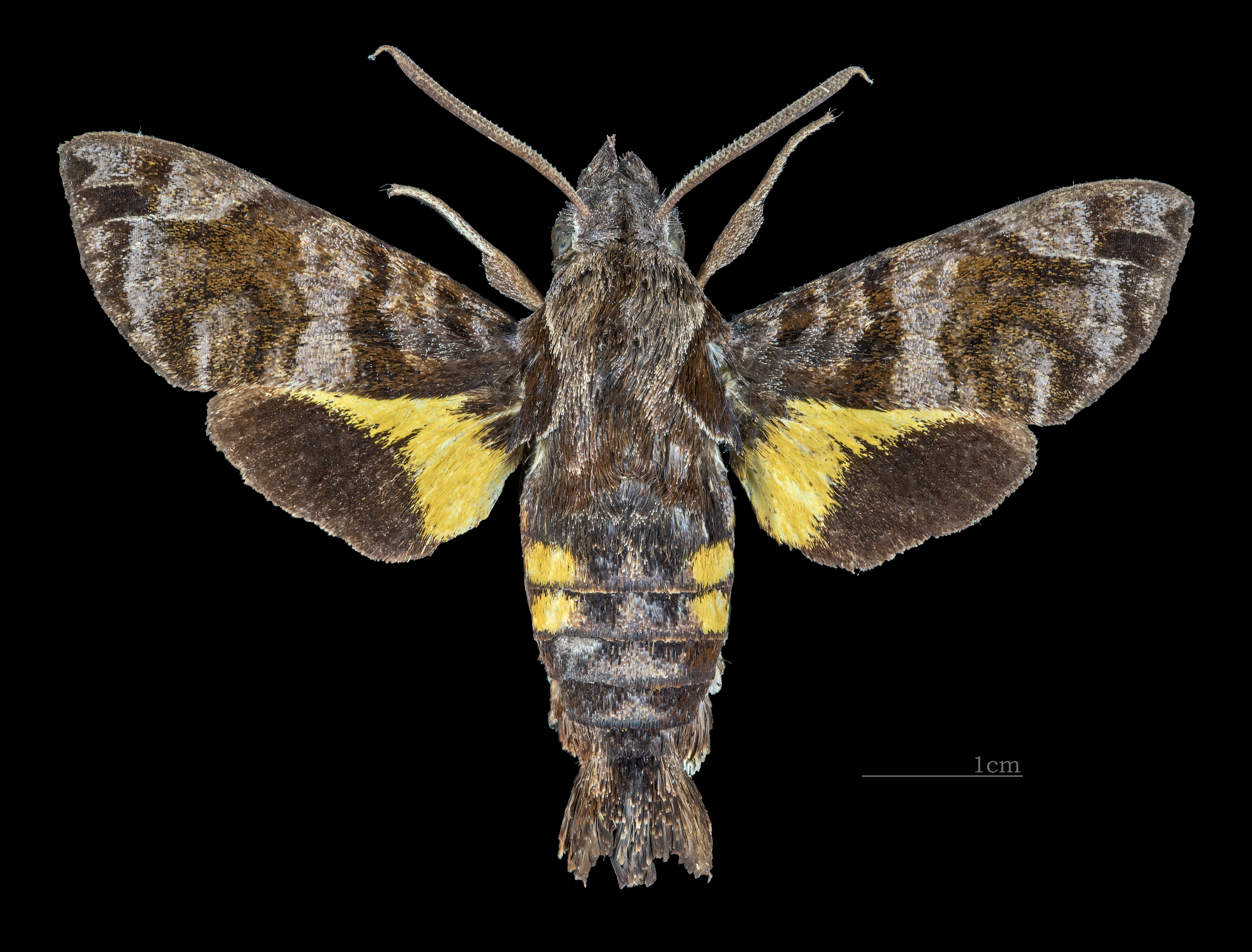
Macroglossum insipida papuanum
Male dorsal

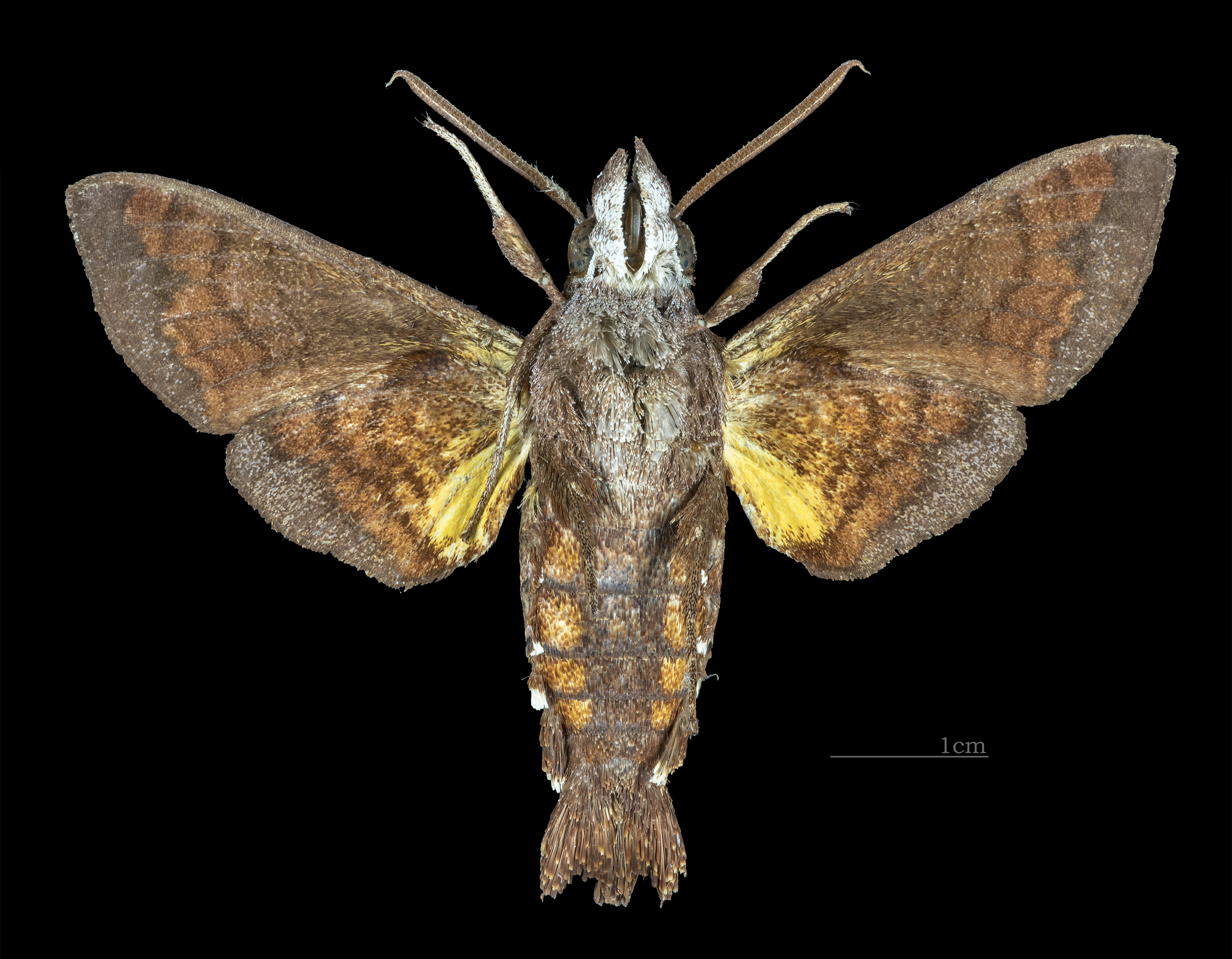
Macroglossum insipida papuanum
Male ventral
