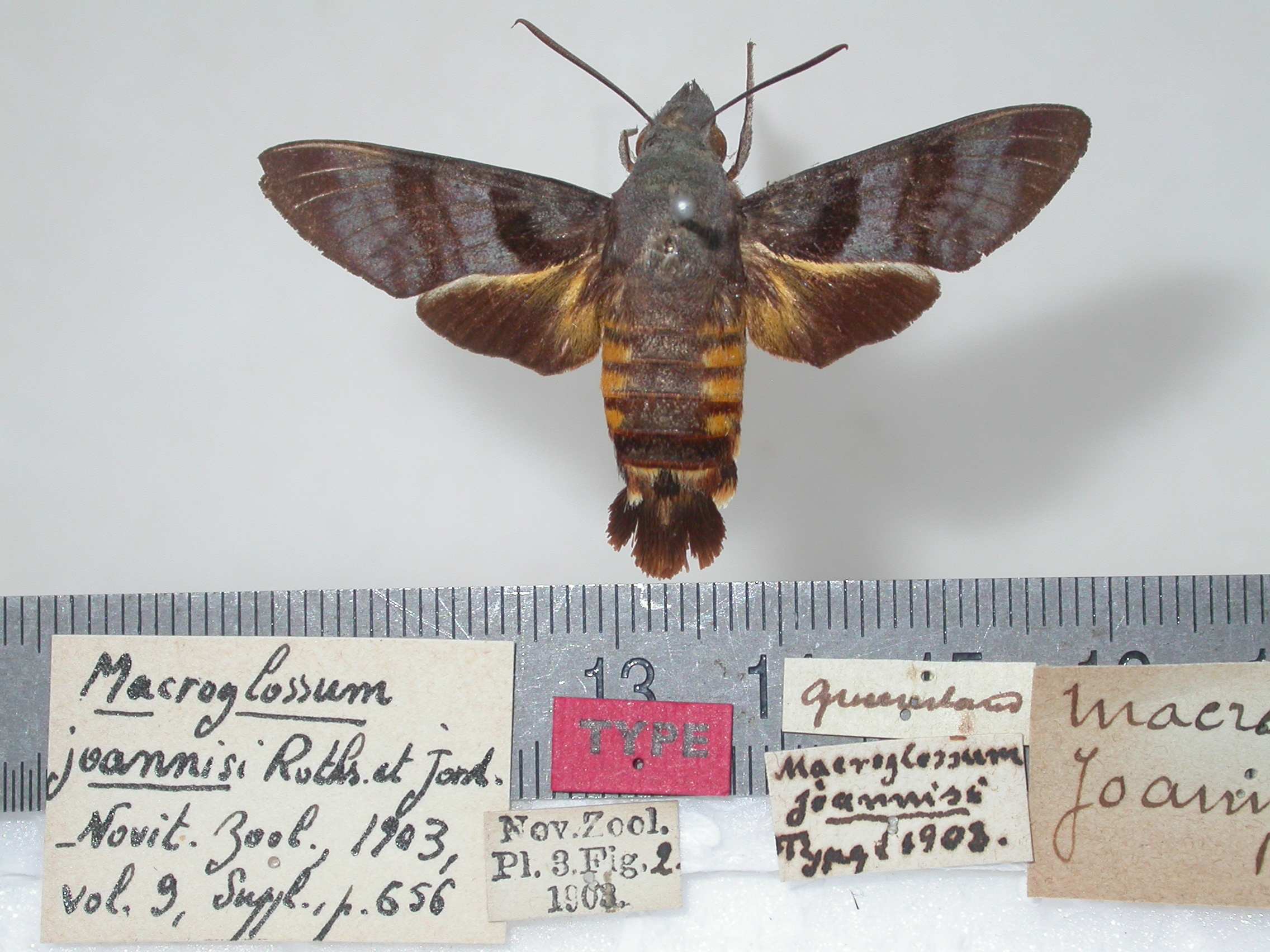

Scientific classification
- Kingdom: Animalia
- Phylum: Arthropoda
- Class: Insecta
- Order: Lepidoptera
- Family: Sphingidae
- Genus: Macroglossum
- Species: M. joannisi

Binomial name
- Macroglossum joannisi Rothschild & Jordan, 1903

= Macroglossum joannisi =

Species of moth

Macroglossum joannisi is a moth of the family Sphingidae. It is known from Queensland.

The length of the forewings is about 22 mm. This species is distinguished from all other Macroglossum species by four yellow abdominal side-patches and the bright underside of the hindwing, together with the pattern and colour of the upperside of the body and wings. The head and thorax uppersides are olive-grey, while the scales have pale tips. The abdomen upperside is shaded with grey mesially. The underside of the palpus is white. The thorax underside is clayish grey mesially and reddish clay-colour laterally. The abdomen underside is mostly cinnamon-red, but paler mesially. The forewing underside is dark walnut-brown and yellow at the base. The hindwing upperside has an interrupted yellow band, suffused with black. The hindwing underside is bright cinnamon-rufous.
