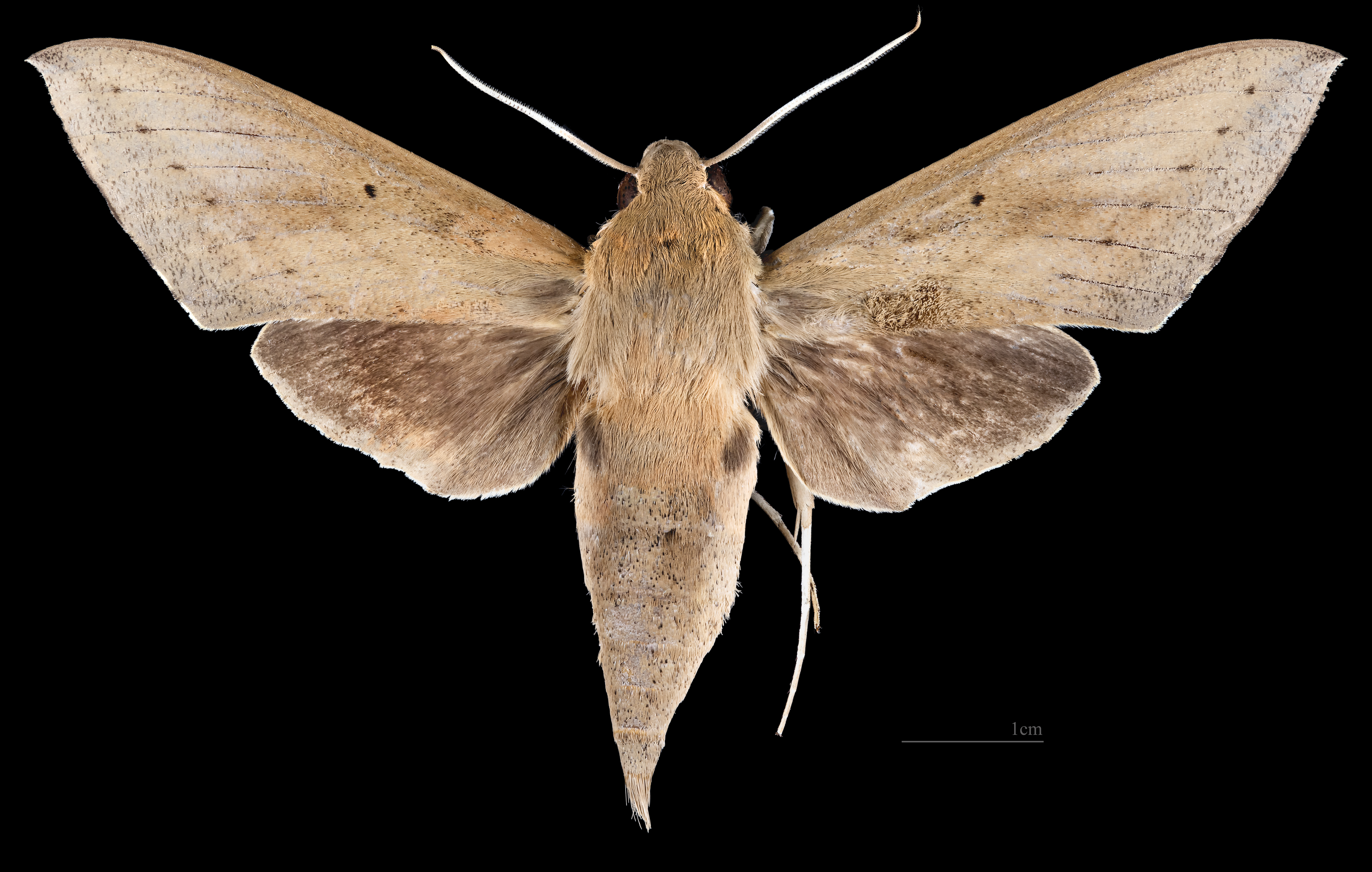
- Male dorsal
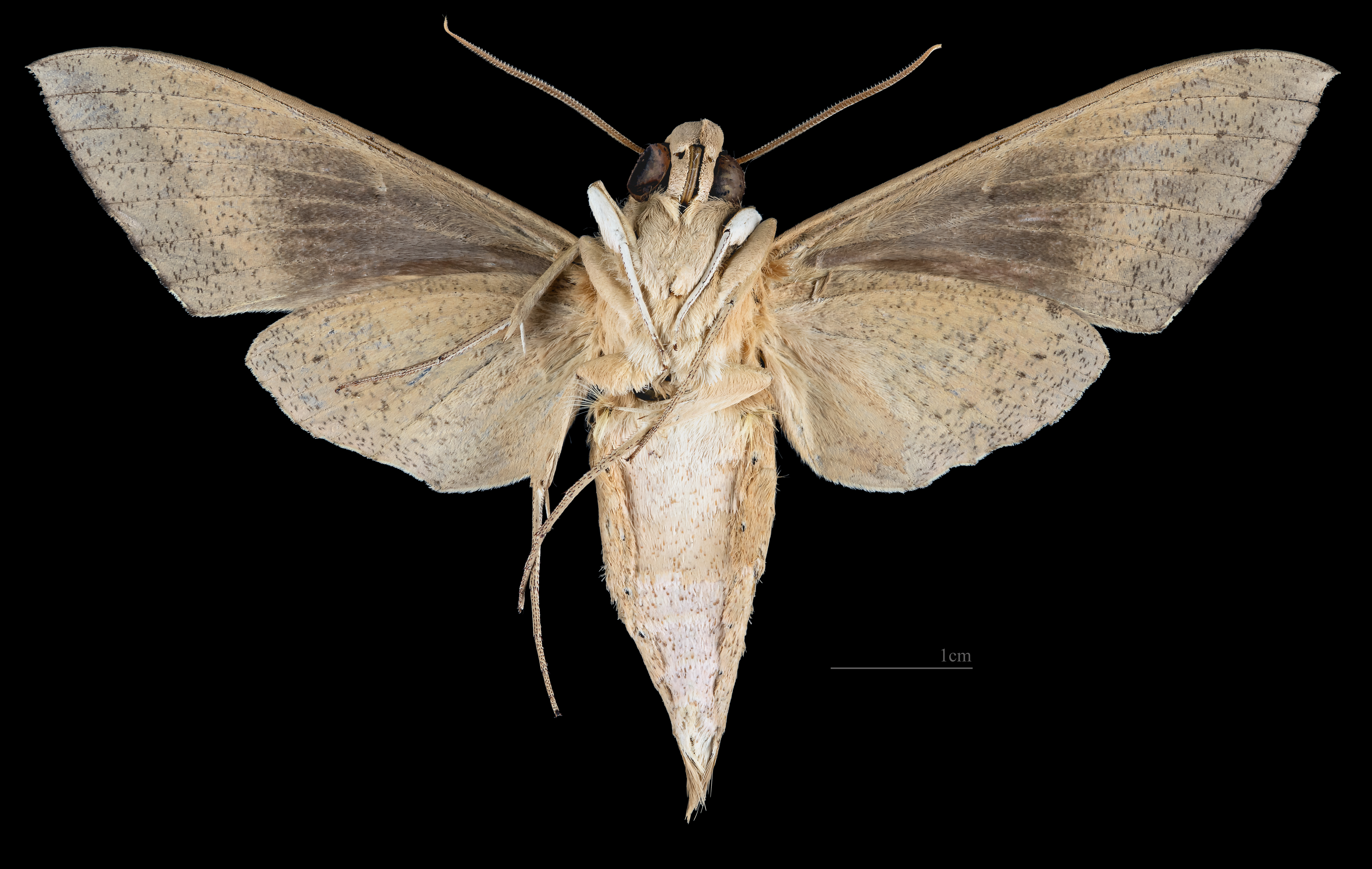
- Male ventral

Scientific classification
- Kingdom: Animalia
- Phylum: Arthropoda
- Class: Insecta
- Order: Lepidoptera
- Family: Sphingidae
- Genus: Theretra
- Species: T. tryoni

Binomial name
- Theretra tryoni (Miskin, 1891)

Synonyms
- Choerocampa tryoni Miskin, 1891; Theretra herrichii Kirby, 1892

= Theretra tryoni =

Species of moth

Theretra tryoni is a moth of the family Sphingidae. It is known from Papua New Guinea, Queensland and north-eastern New South Wales.

The wingspan is about 70 mm.

The larvae feed on Alocasia macrorrhizos, Colocasia esculenta and Zantedeschia aethiopica.
