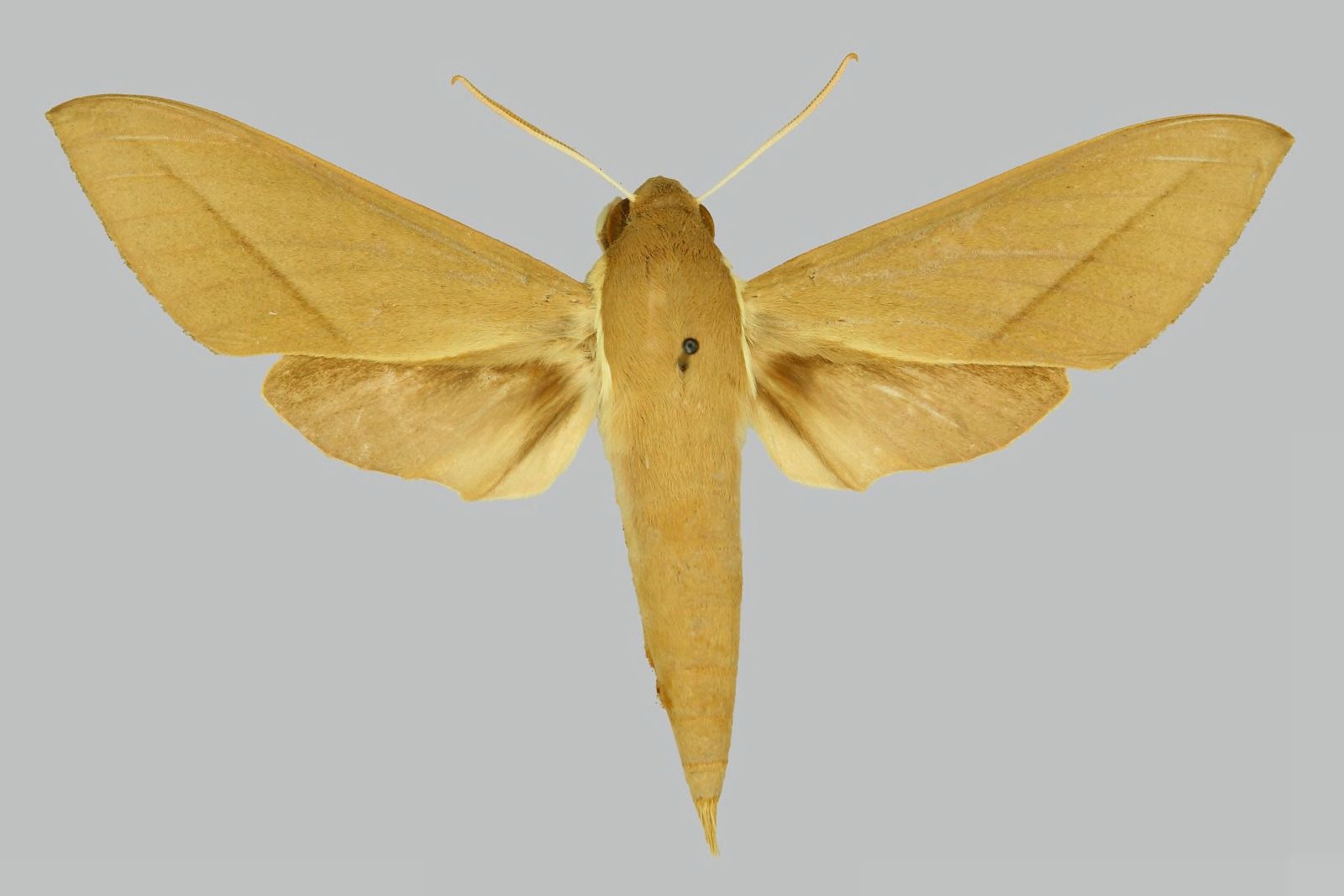
- male, upperside.

Scientific classification
- Kingdom: Animalia
- Phylum: Arthropoda
- Class: Insecta
- Order: Lepidoptera
- Family: Sphingidae
- Genus: Theretra
- Species: T. inornata

Binomial name
- Theretra inornata (Walker, 1865)

Synonyms
- Chaerocampa inornata Walker, 1865; Chaerocampa pallida Miskin, 1891

= Theretra inornata =

Species of moth

Theretra inornata is a moth of the family Sphingidae. It is known from Queensland.

The upperside is uniformly olive-green or brown with a minimum of forewing pattern. The antenna have pinkish white dorsal scaling, with a black apical patch. The forewing upperside is uniform olive-green or brown with only a small discal spot and a single strong oblique postmedian line that does not reach the wing apex.
