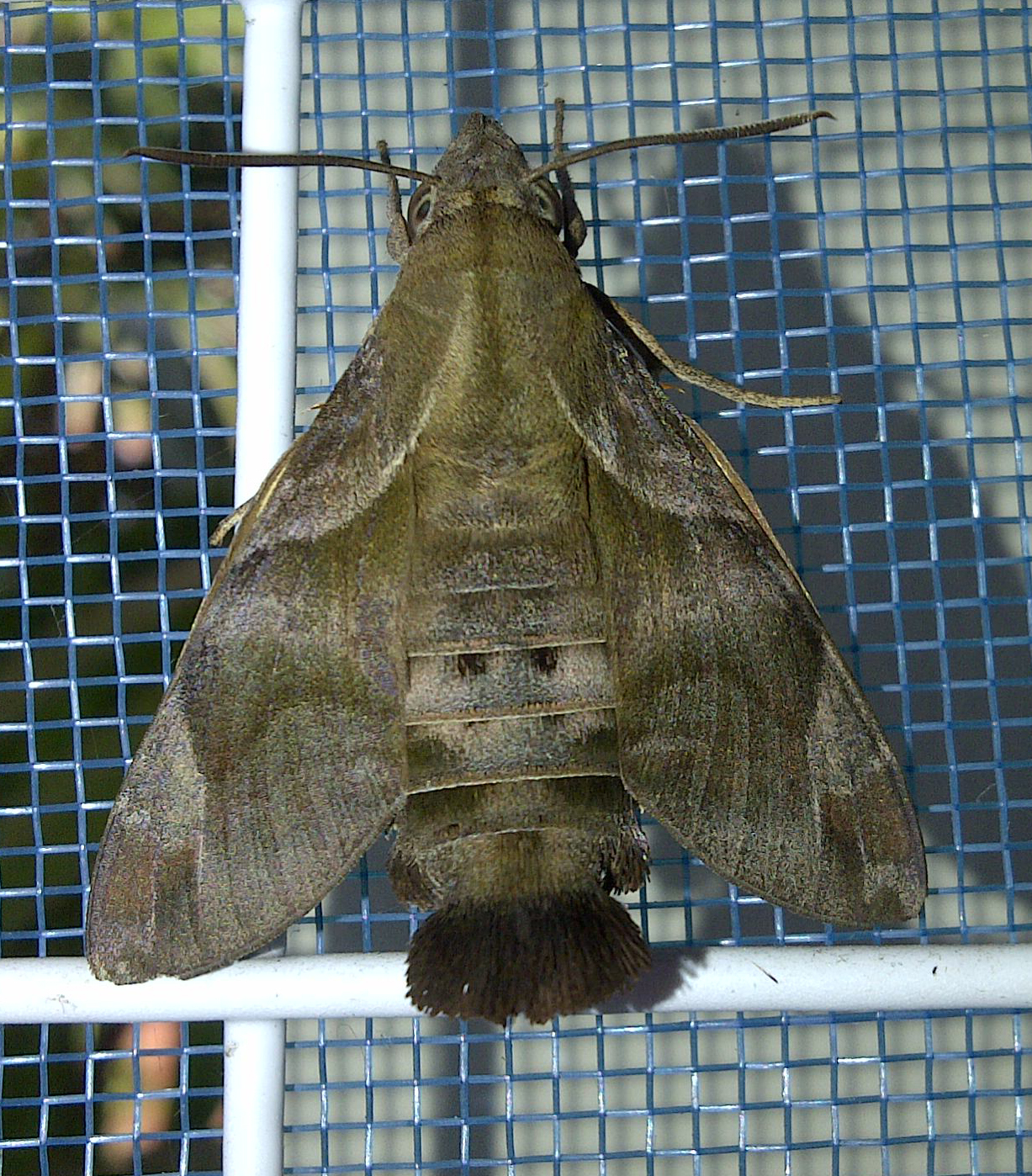

Scientific classification
- Kingdom: Animalia
- Phylum: Arthropoda
- Class: Insecta
- Order: Lepidoptera
- Family: Sphingidae
- Genus: Macroglossum
- Species: M. prometheus

Binomial name
- Macroglossum prometheus Boisduval, 1875

Synonyms
- Macroglossa inusitata Swinhoe, 1892; Macroglossa inconspicua Rothschild, 1894; Macroglossum maculatum Moore, 1858

= Macroglossum prometheus =

Species of moth

Macroglossum prometheus is a moth of the family Sphingidae.

== Distribution ==
It is known from south-east Asia and Queensland.

== Description ==
The wingspan is about 50 mm. There is a prominent, subapical, costal, grey patch on the forewing and a sharply defined distal border on the hindwing. Both wing undersides are brown, shaded with khaki, the yellow anal area contrasts sharply. The hindwing upperside has a yellow band which is very sharply defined.

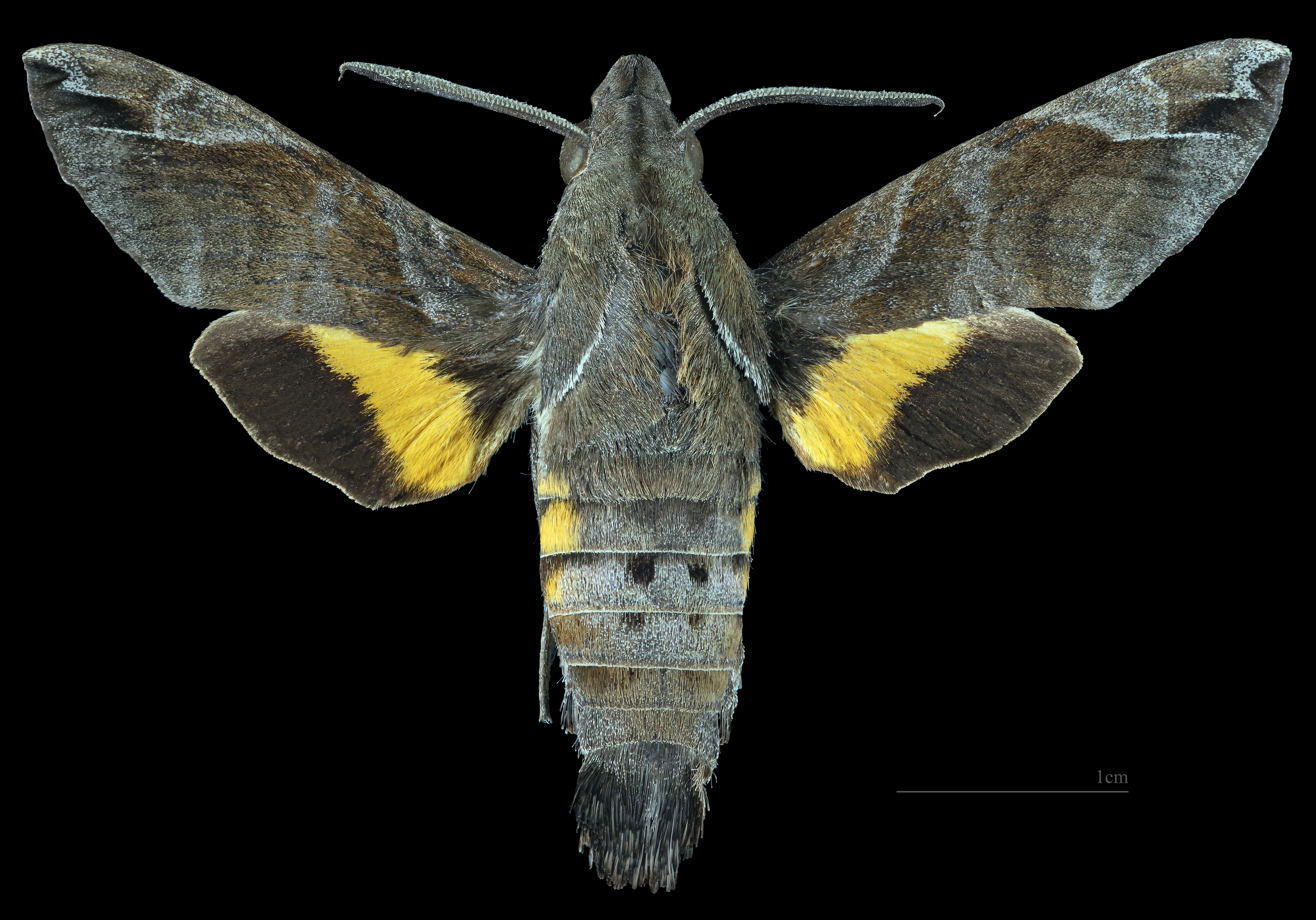
Male dorsal

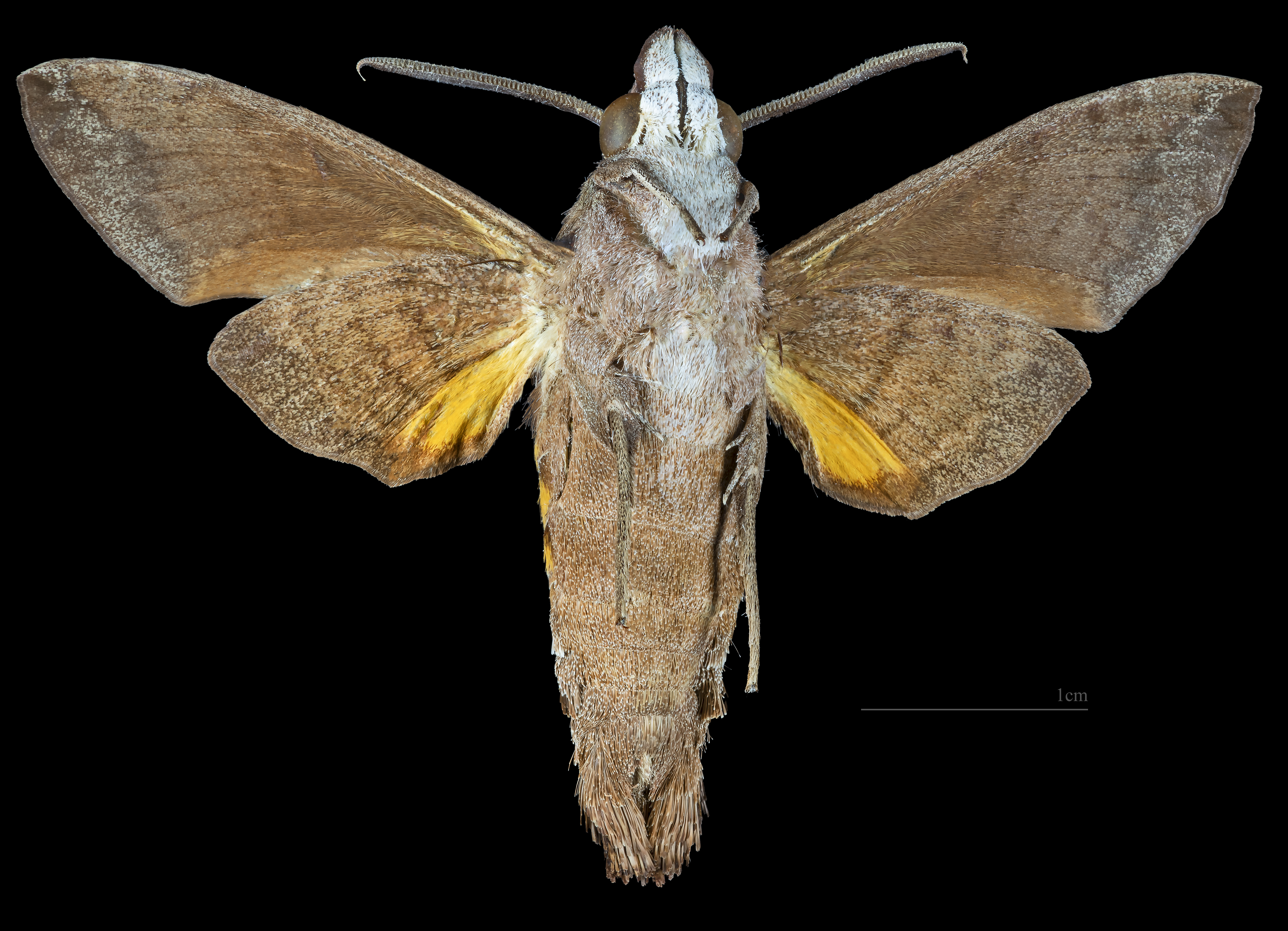
Male Ventral

== Subspecies ==
- Macroglossum prometheus prometheus
- Macroglossum prometheus lineata Lucas, 1891 (Australia)
