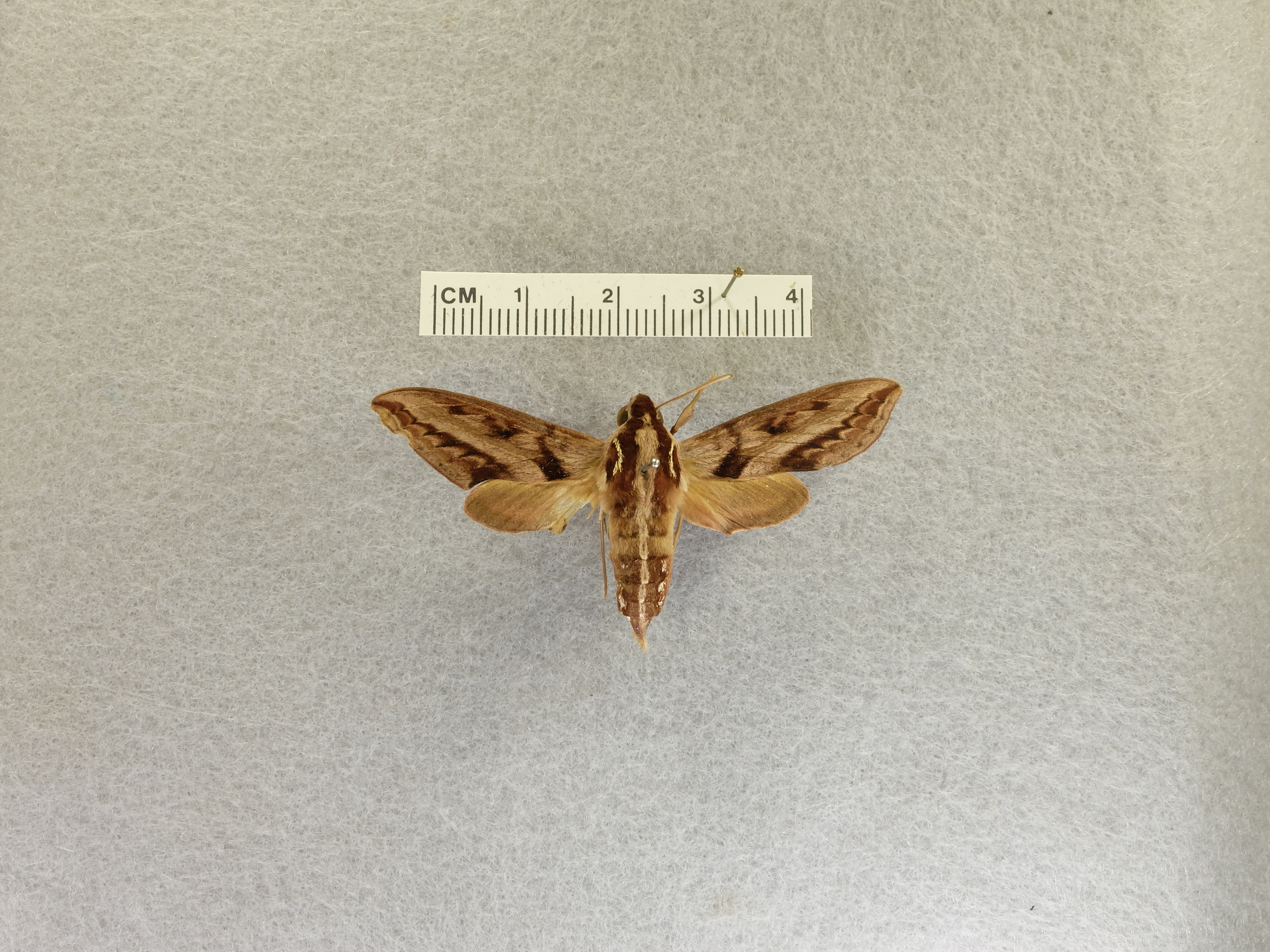

Scientific classification
- Kingdom: Animalia
- Phylum: Arthropoda
- Class: Insecta
- Order: Lepidoptera
- Family: Sphingidae
- Genus: Theretra
- Species: T. turneri

Binomial name
- Theretra turneri (T. P. Lucas, 1891)

Synonyms
- Panacra turneri T. P. Lucas, 1891; Panacra mira C. Swinhoe, 1892

= Theretra turneri =

Species of moth

Theretra turneri is a moth of the family Sphingidae first described by Thomas Pennington Lucas in 1891. It is known from the Australian state of Queensland.

The wingspan is about 60 mm. Adults have light brown forewings with a number of dark brown markings. They have plain brown hindwings.
