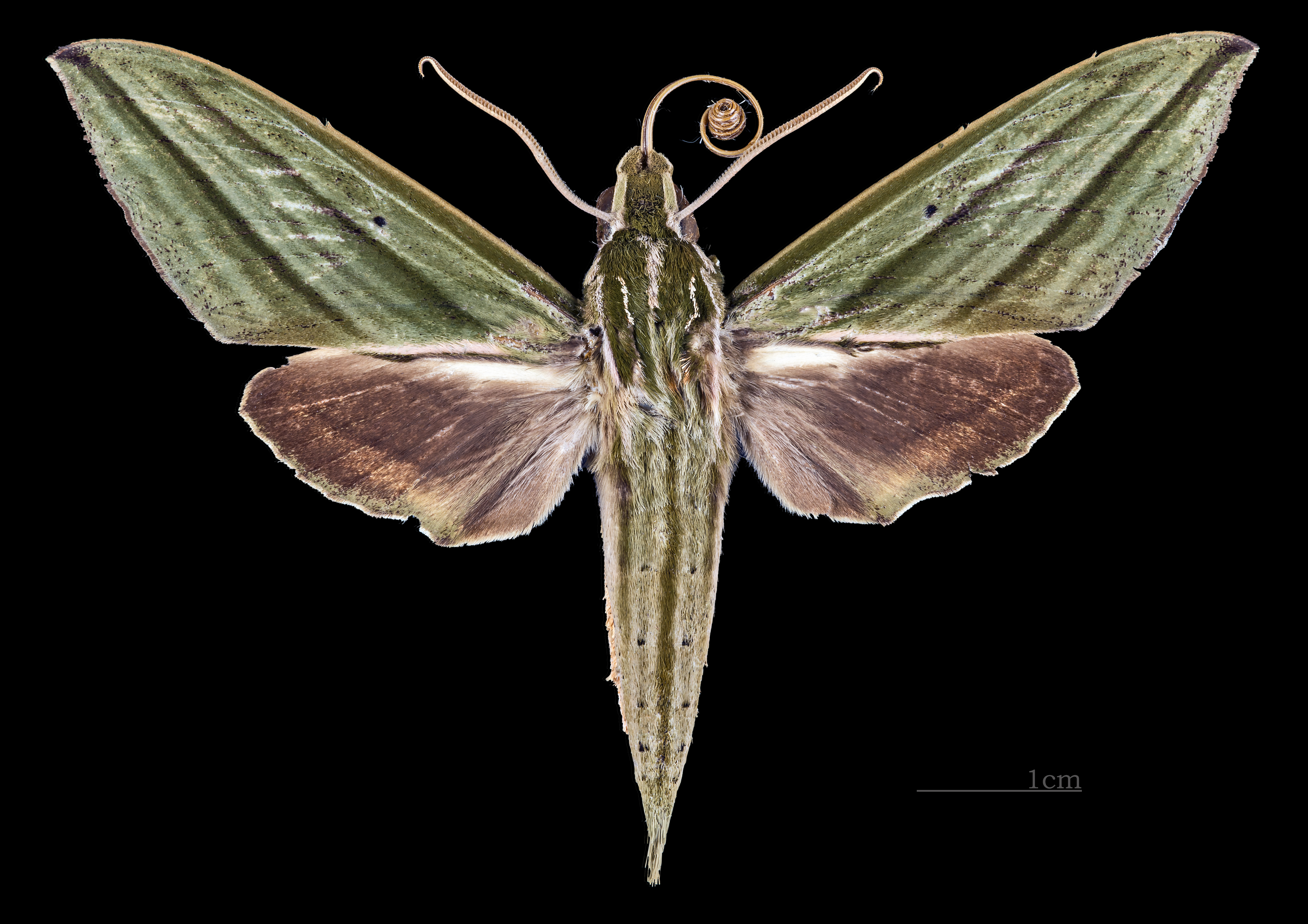
- Theretra manilae male dorsal
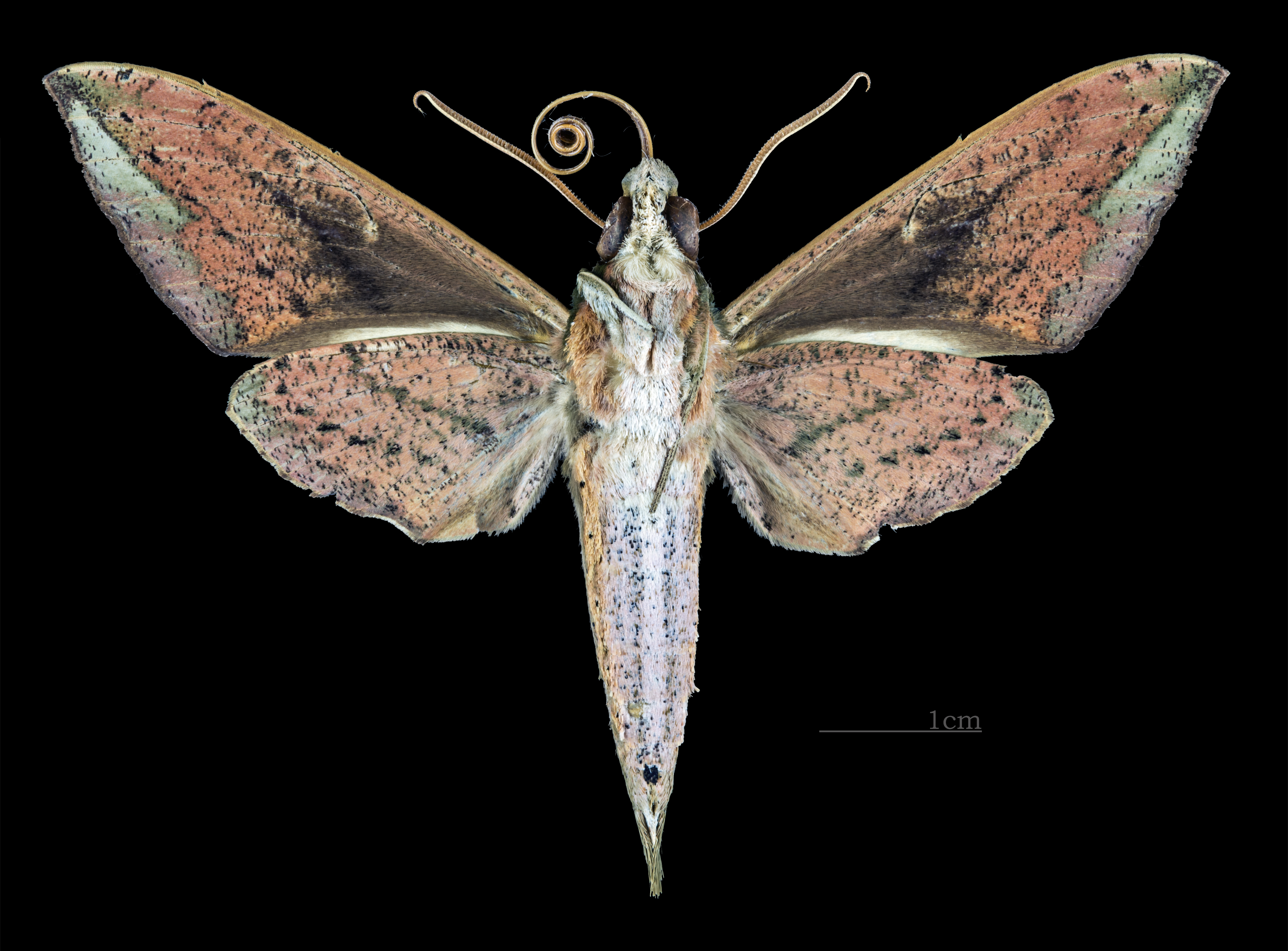
- Theretra manilae male ventral

Scientific classification
- Kingdom: Animalia
- Phylum: Arthropoda
- Clade: Pancrustacea
- Class: Insecta
- Order: Lepidoptera
- Family: Sphingidae
- Genus: Theretra
- Species: T. manilae

Binomial name
- Theretra manilae Clark, 1922

= Theretra manilae =

Species of moth

Theretra manilae is a moth of the family Sphingidae. It is known from the Philippines.

The wingspan is 71–75 mm. It resembles a small, deeper green Theretra rhesus but the forewings are shorter and squarer and the outer margin is less convex. The green colour is often replaced by brown, probably as a result of the influence of high humidity. The inner margins of the tegulae are silver. The fifth and sixth postmedian lines on the forewing upperside run parallel over the posterior half of the wing and are only narrowly separated on the inner margin, the area between them is beige. The submarginal line lacks conspicuous vein dots.
