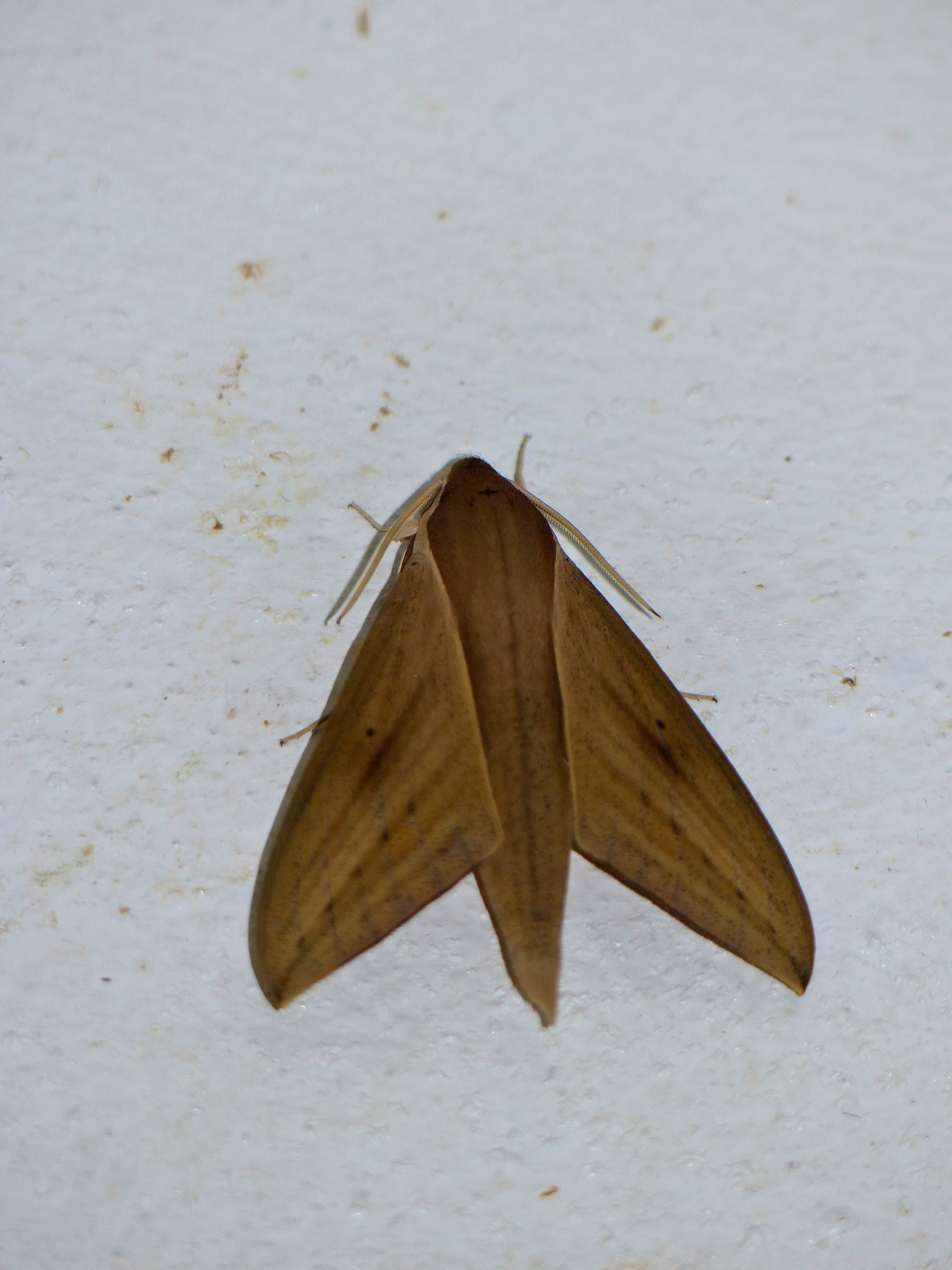

Scientific classification
- Kingdom: Animalia
- Phylum: Arthropoda
- Class: Insecta
- Order: Lepidoptera
- Family: Sphingidae
- Genus: Theretra
- Species: T. rhesus

Binomial name
- Theretra rhesus (Boisduval, 1875)

Synonyms
- Choerocampa rhesus Boisduval, 1875; Theretra javanica Rothschild, 1894

= Theretra rhesus =

Species of moth

Theretra rhesus is a moth of the family Sphingidae. It is known from Malaysia (Peninsular, Sarawak, Sabah), Indonesia (Sumatra to Sulawesi) and the Philippines.

== Description ==
It is similar to Theretra boisduvali and Theretra insularis insularis but much more heavily marked and the dorsal lines of the thorax and abdomen are more distinct. The forewing upperside has six oblique postmedian lines. The first line reaching the inner margin almost at the wing base, the second and third are close together and the third and fourth are more widely separated than in Theretra boisduvali. The fourth line is the strongest.

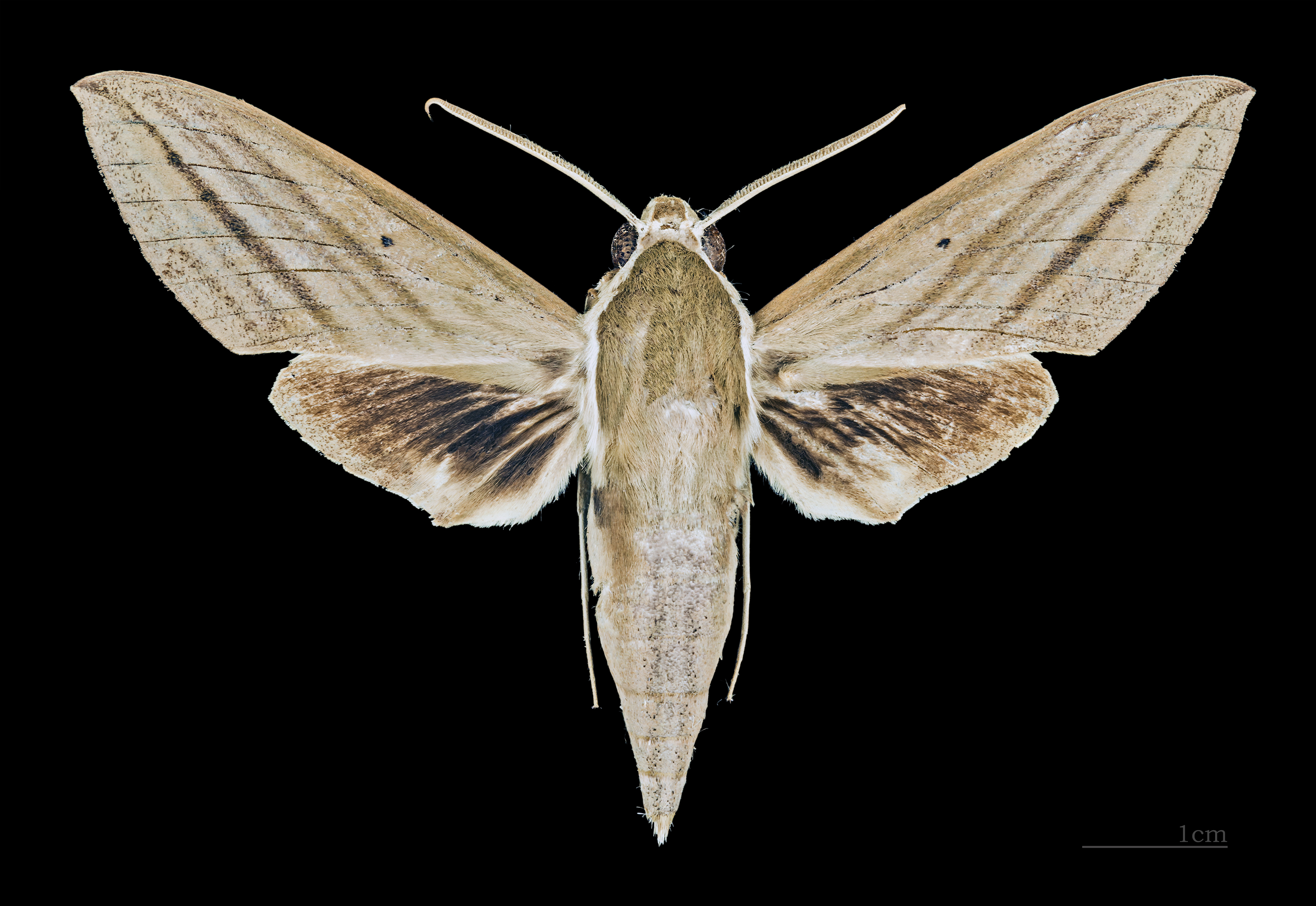
Male dorsal view

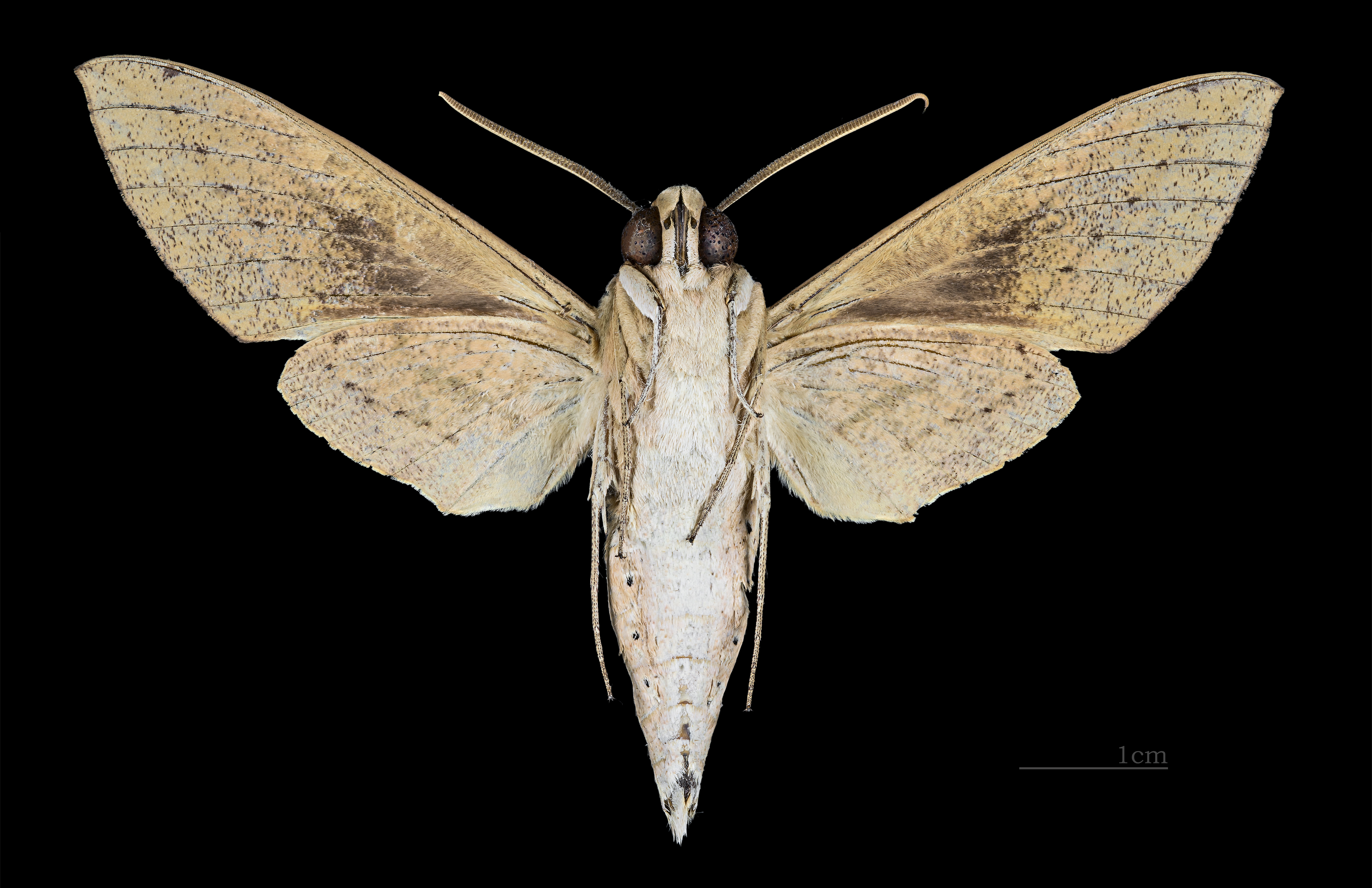
Male ventral view

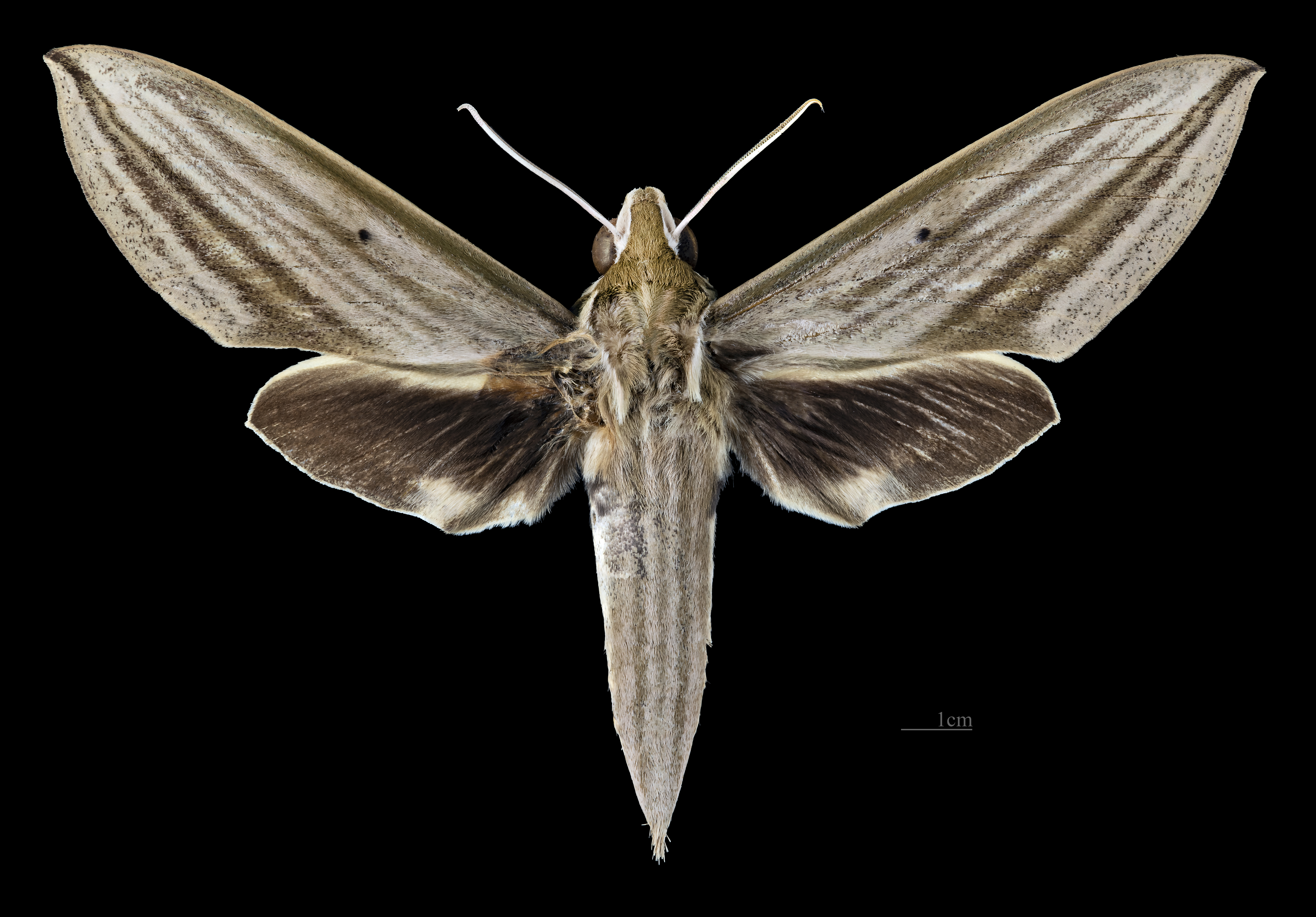
Female dorsal view

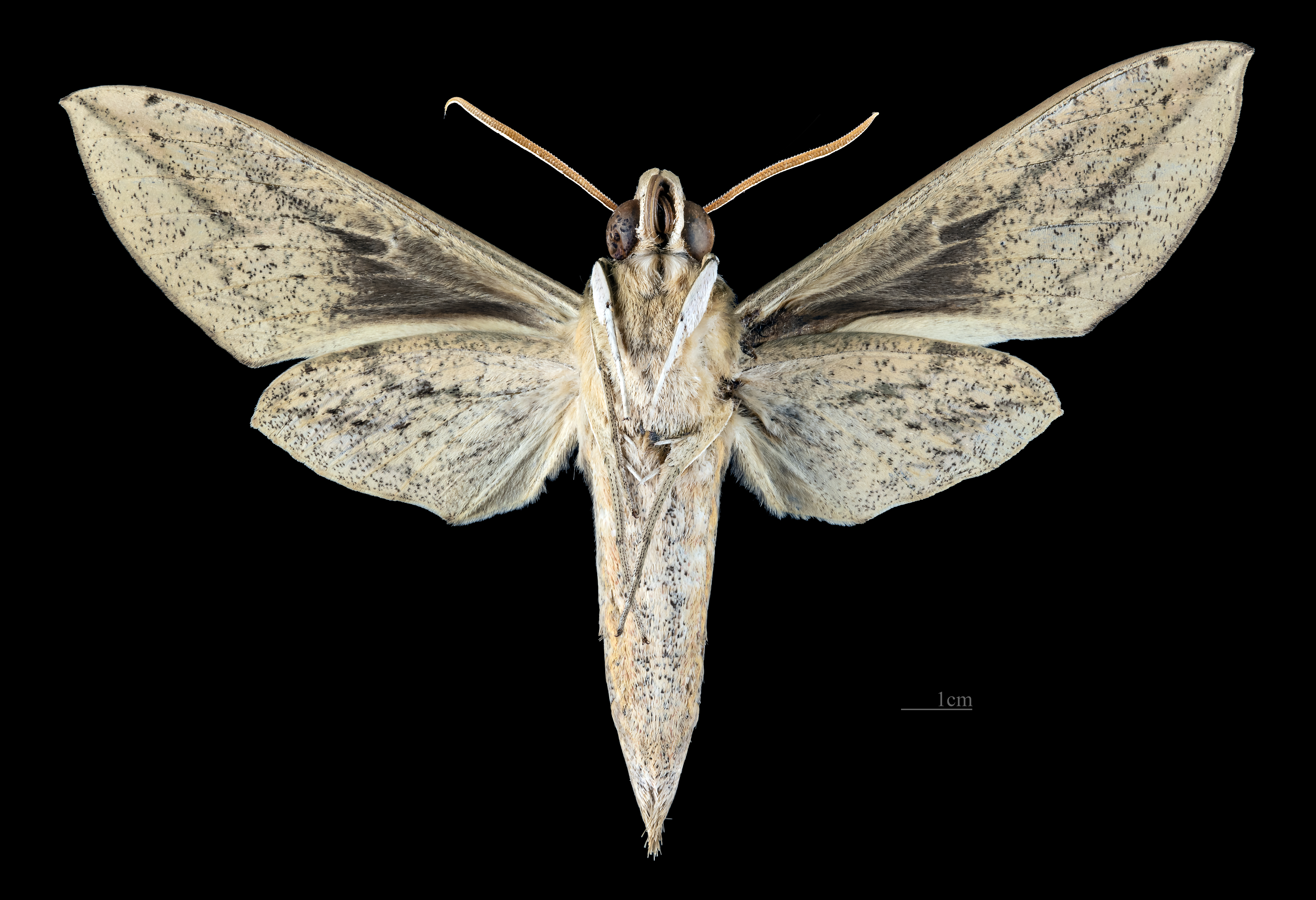
Female ventral view
