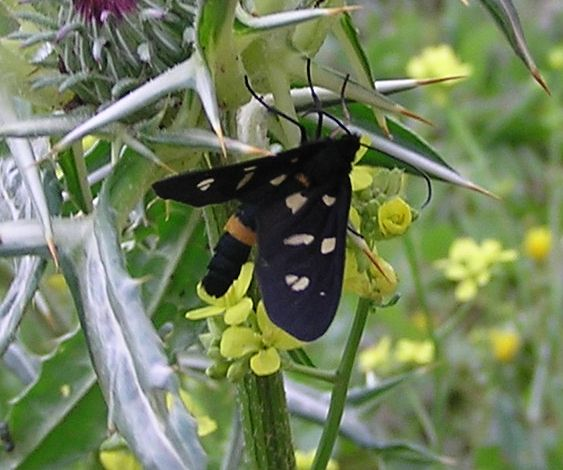

Scientific classification
- Domain: Eukaryota
- Kingdom: Animalia
- Phylum: Arthropoda
- Class: Insecta
- Order: Lepidoptera
- Superfamily: Noctuoidea
- Family: Erebidae
- Subfamily: Arctiinae
- Genus: Amata
- Species: A. mestralii

Binomial name
- Amata mestralii (Bugnion, 1837)

Synonyms
- Syntomis mestralii Bugnion, 1837; Syntomis kindermanni Lederer, 1858; Amata mestralii ab. palestinae Staudinger

= Amata mestralii =

Species of moth

Amata mestralii is a moth of the family Erebidae first described by Charles-Juste Bugnion in 1837. It is found in Israel and Syria.
