= Agrotis pierreti =

Scientific classification
- Kingdom: Animalia
- Phylum: Arthropoda
- Clade: Pancrustacea
- Class: Insecta
- Order: Lepidoptera
- Superfamily: Noctuoidea
- Family: Noctuidae
- Genus: Agrotis
- Species: A. pierreti

Binomial name
- Agrotis pierreti (Bugnion, 1837)

Synonyms
- Powellinia pierreti

Species of moth

Agrotis pierreti is a moth of the family Noctuidae. It is found in south-east Spain. In North Africa it is widespread from Morocco to Egypt. It is also found in Israel, Jordan, Iraq and Iran.
