= Clytie syriaca =

Scientific classification
- Kingdom: Animalia
- Phylum: Arthropoda
- Class: Insecta
- Order: Lepidoptera
- Superfamily: Noctuoidea
- Family: Erebidae
- Genus: Clytie
- Species: C. syriaca

Binomial name
- Clytie syriaca (Bugnion, 1837)

Synonyms
- Ophiusa syriaca; Ophiusa gentilitia; Clytie syrdaja; Clytie syriaca suppura

Species of moth

Clytie syriaca is a moth of the family Erebidae first described by Charles-Juste Bugnion in 1837. It is found along the coastal regions of the Mediterranean Basin, from the Balkans to Turkey, Lebanon, Syria and Israel.

There are two generations per year. Adults are on wing in April, May and September.

The larvae feed on Tamarix nilotica, Tamarix gallica and Tamarix ramosissima.
