= Charles-Juste Bugnion =

Swiss banker and Vaudoise political personality (1811–1897)

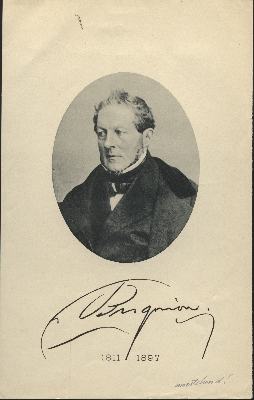
Charles Juste Jean Marie Bugnion

Charles-Juste Bugnion, full name Charles Juste Jean Marie Bugnion (10 February 1811, Lausanne – 17 January 1897, Lausanne), was a Swiss banker and Vaudoise political personality. He was a member of the Société Helvétique des sciences naturelles and one of the founding members of the Société entomologique de France.

His insect collection, mainly Coleoptera, is held by Musée Cantonal de Zoologie in Lausanne. Begun at the Cantonal and University Library of Lausanne in 1999, the entomological library of Charles-Juste Bugnion is a collection comprising 27 books forming 74 volumes relating to insects (including butterflies) and birds. Most of these works, published in the 18th century and the beginning of the 19th century, contain coloured plates of exceptional freshness, some of them heightened with gold leaf.

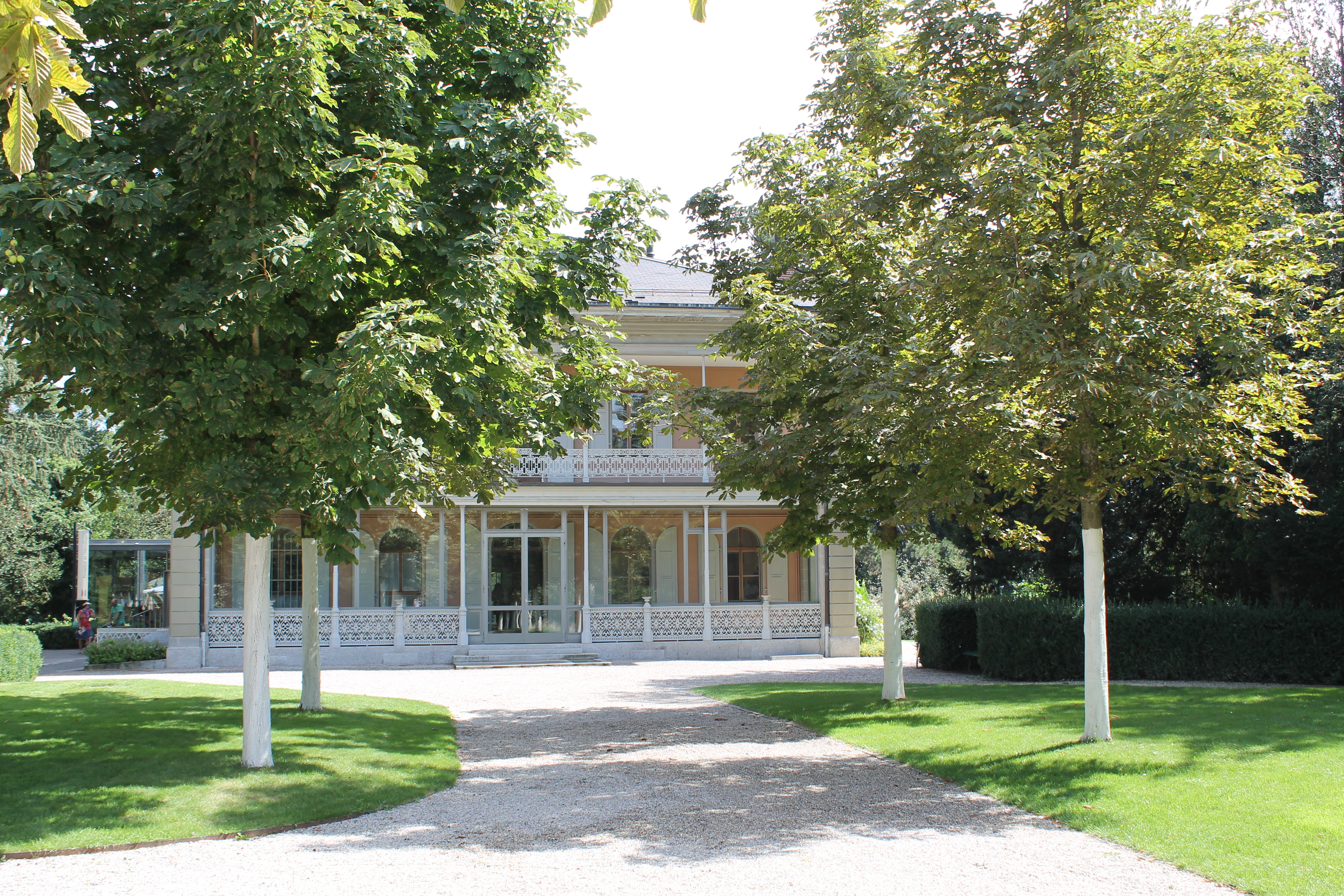
L'Hermitage Bugnion's house in Lausanne built in 1841

== Works ==
- Bugnion, C. J. J. M. (1834) Note sur le Satyrus Styx. Annales de la Société Entomologique de France, Paris (Pitois-Levrault et Cie.) 3 (2) 337-340.
- Bugnion, C. J. J. M. (1837) Description de quatre nouvelles espéces de Lepidoptéres de la Syrie et de l'Egypte. Annales de la Société Entomologique de France, 6:439-444.
- Bugnion, C. J. J. M. (1839) Note sur le Sphinx cretica. Annales de la Société Entomologique de France 8: 113-116. Paris (Pitois-Levrault et Cie.).
- Bugnion, C. J. J. M.; Blanchet, R.; Forel, A. (1841) Mémoire sur quelques Insectes qui nuisent à la vigne dans le Canton du Vaud. Neue Denkschriften der Allgemeinen Schweizerischen Gesellschaft für die gesammten Naturwissenschaften, Neuchatel - 5 1-44, 1 col. Taf.
- Bugnion, C. J. J. M.; Blanchet, R.; Forel, A. (1843) [Mémoire sur quelques Insectes qui nuisent à la vigne dans le Canton du Vaud, par MM. Bugnion, Blanchet et Forel]. Isis oder Encyclopaedische Zeitung von Oken, Leipzig - [36] (XI) 860-864

== Species described by Bugnion ==
- Theretra boisduvalii Sphingidae
- Clytie syriaca Noctuidae
- Agrotis pierreti Noctuidae
- Amata mestralii Erebidae
