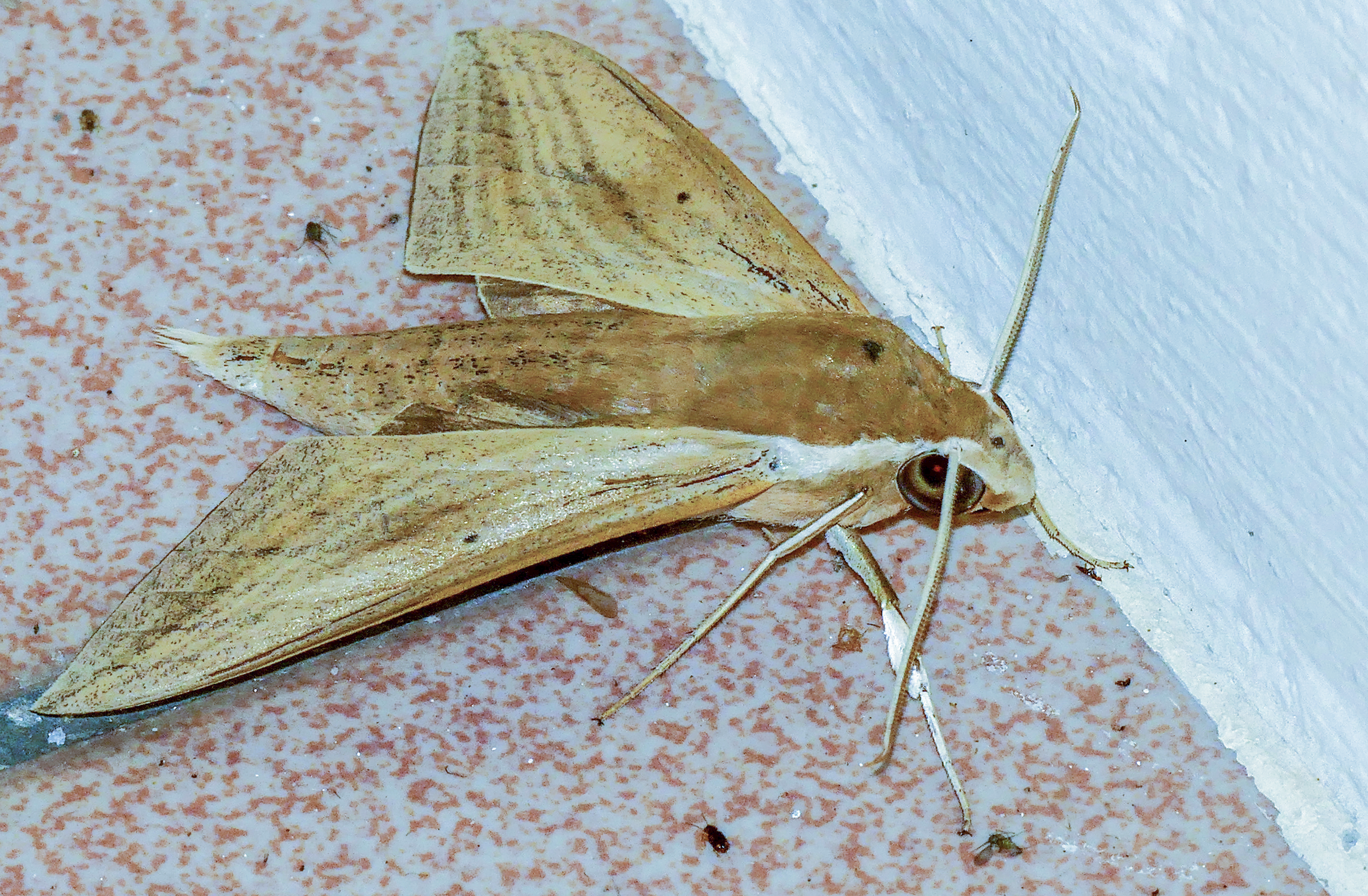

Scientific classification
- Kingdom: Animalia
- Phylum: Arthropoda
- Class: Insecta
- Order: Lepidoptera
- Family: Sphingidae
- Genus: Theretra
- Species: T. boisduvalii

Binomial name
- Theretra boisduvalii (Bugnion, 1839)

Synonyms
- Sphinx boisduvalii Bugnion, 1839; Chaerocampa punctivenata Butler, 1875

= Theretra boisduvalii =

Species of moth

Theretra boisduvalii is a moth of the family Sphingidae.

== Distribution ==
It is found from south-eastern Iran, east to Sri Lanka and through the highlands of the Himalaya to south-east Asia and Borneo. They sometimes stray into Turkey and Greece.

== Description ==
The wingspan is 85–110 mm.

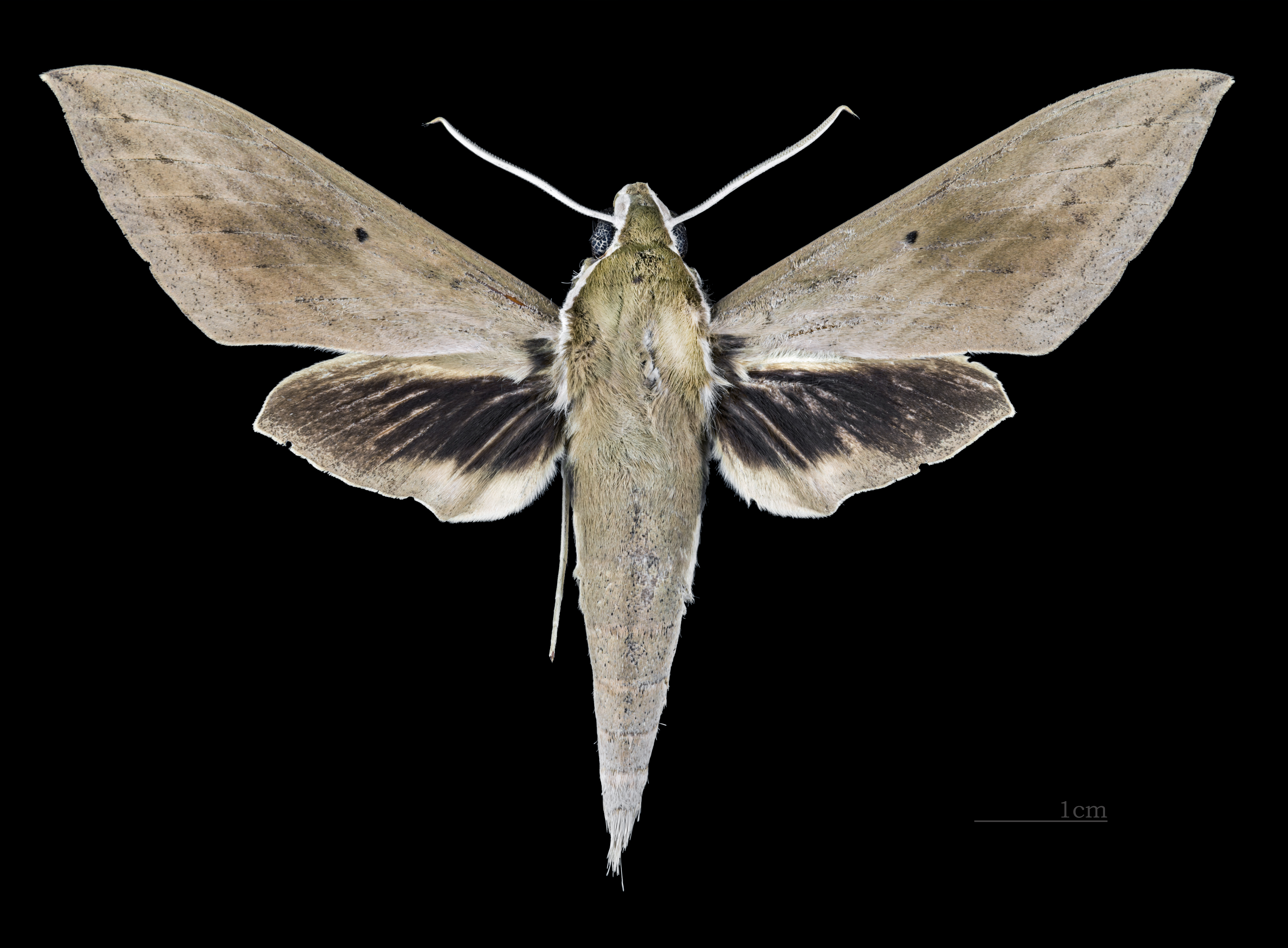
Male dorsal (coll.MHNT)

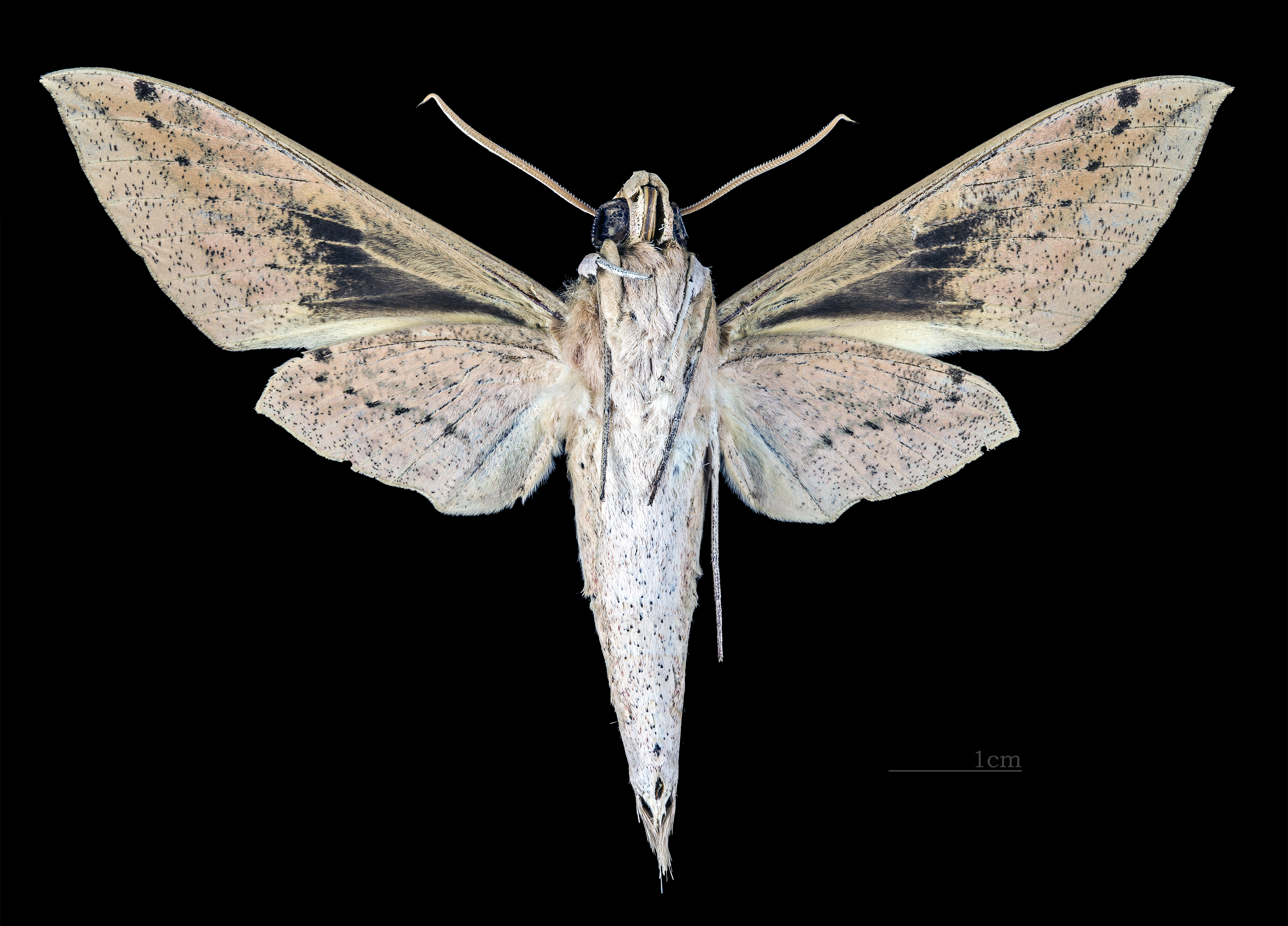
Male △ ventral (coll.MHNT)

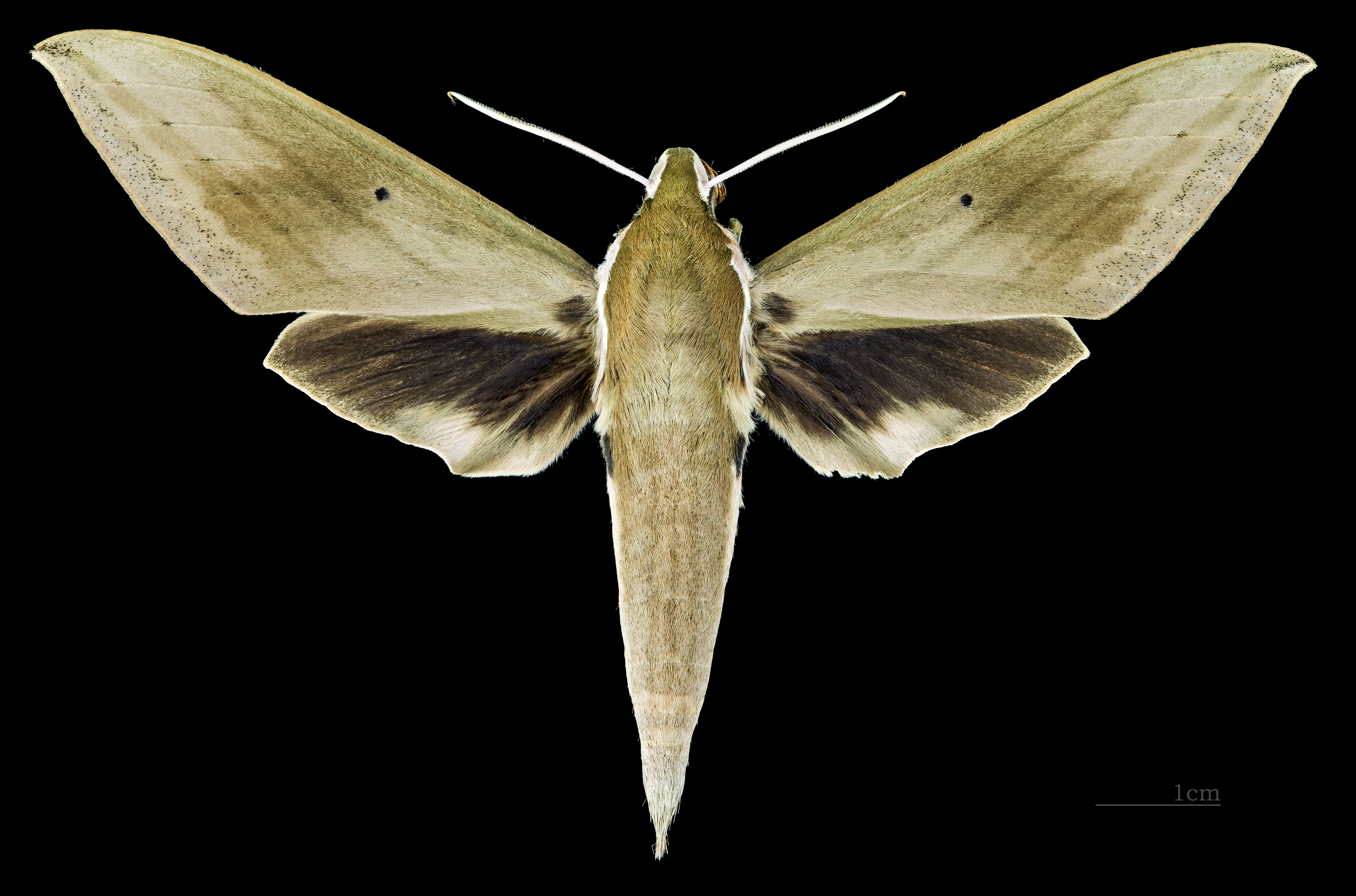
Female dorsal (coll.MHNT)

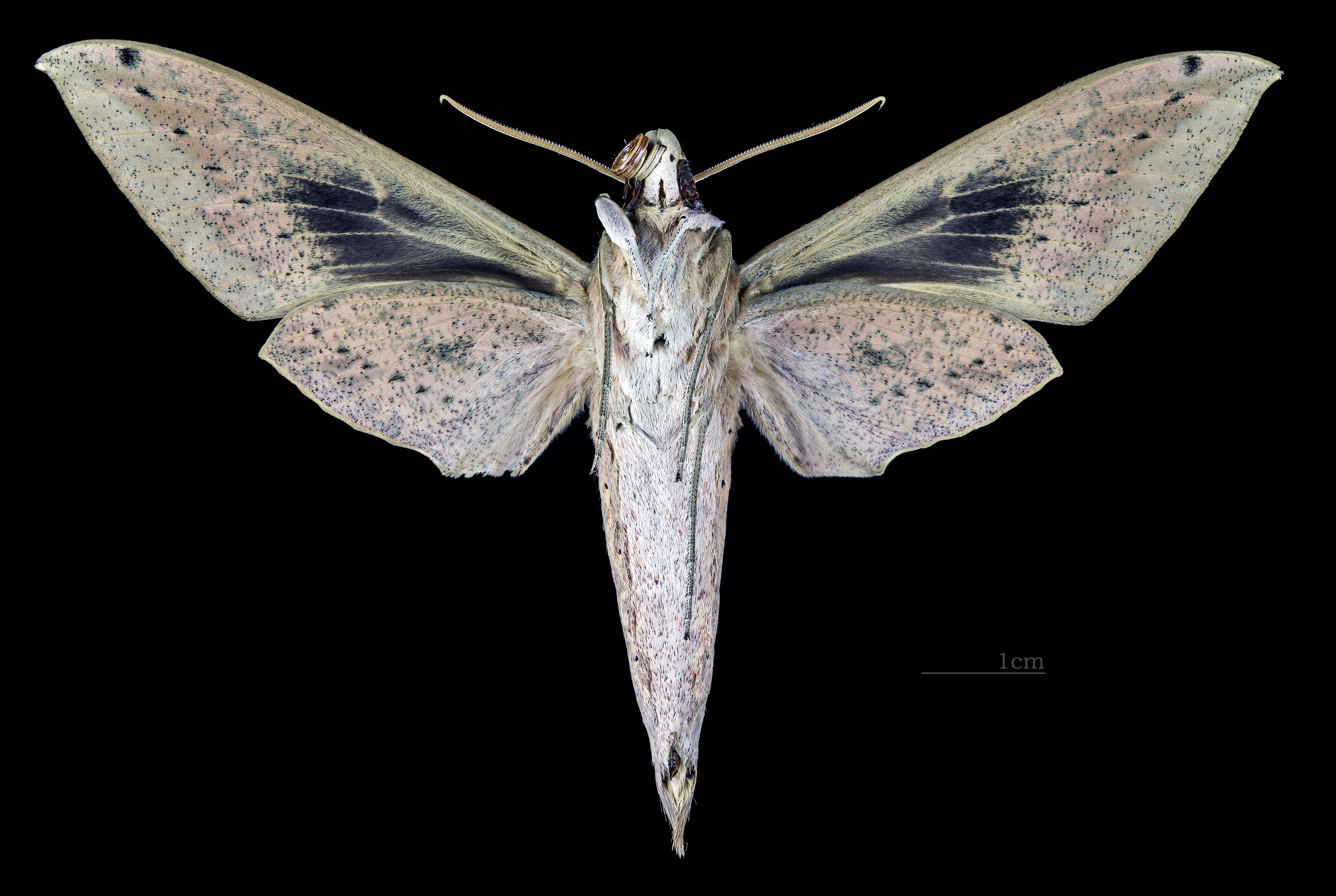
Female ventral (coll.MHNT)

== Biology ==
The larvae feed on Vitis and Parthenocissus species.
