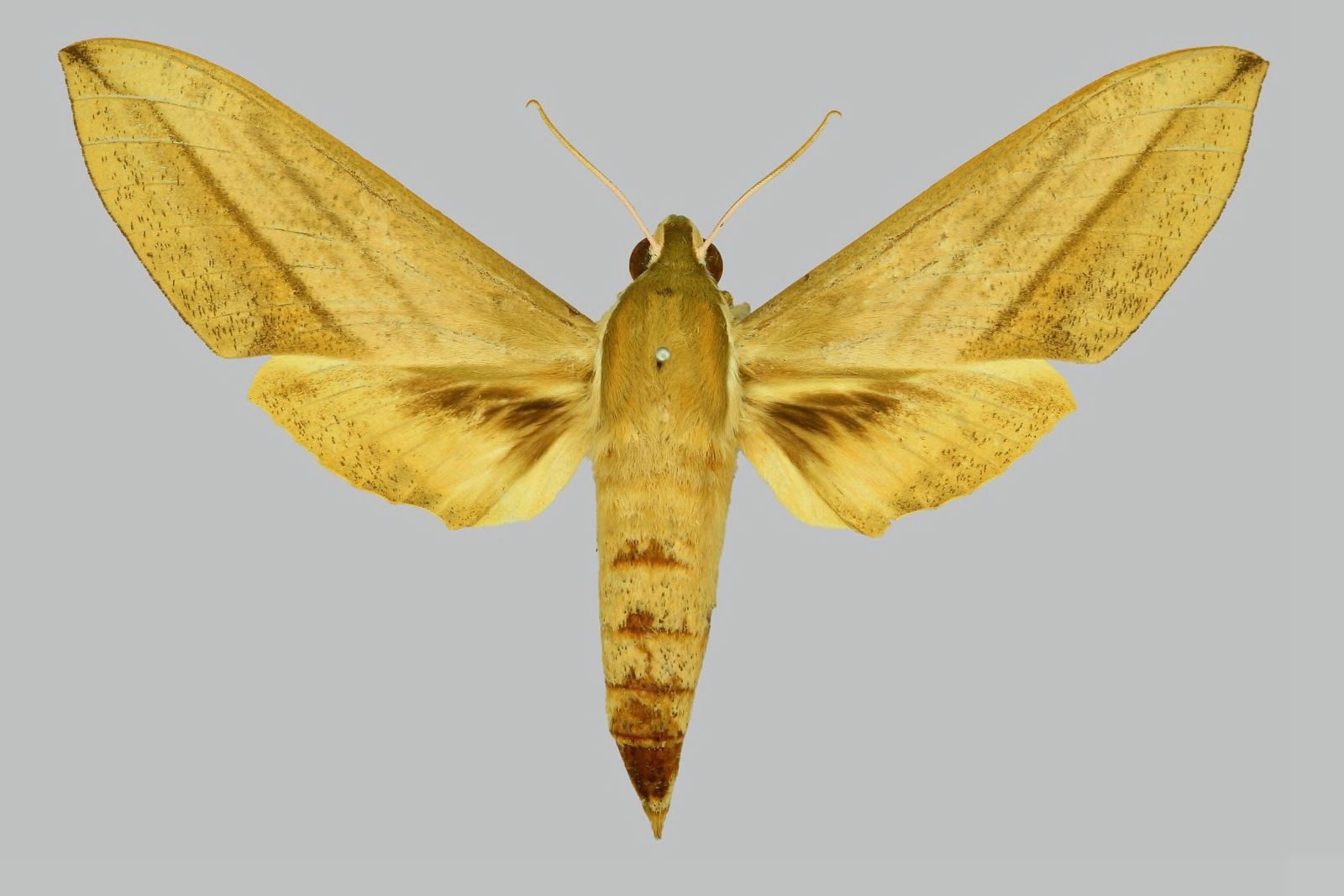

Scientific classification
- Kingdom: Animalia
- Phylum: Arthropoda
- Class: Insecta
- Order: Lepidoptera
- Family: Sphingidae
- Genus: Theretra
- Species: T. insularis

Binomial name
- Theretra insularis (C. Swinhoe, 1892)

Synonyms
- Chaerocampa insularis C. Swinhoe, 1892

= Theretra insularis =

Species of moth

Theretra insularis is a moth of the family Sphingidae first described by Charles Swinhoe in 1892. It is known from the Philippines, north-eastern Borneo, the Moluccas, Papua New Guinea, the Solomon Islands and Fiji.

== Subspecies ==
- Theretra insularis insularis (the Philippines, north-eastern Borneo, Moluccas, Papua New Guinea, Solomon Islands, Fiji Islands)
- Theretra insularis ambrymensis Lachlan, 2004 (Ambrym Island)
- Theretra insularis lenis Jordan, 1926 (Solomon Islands)
- Theretra insularis mollis Jordan, 1926 (St. Matthias Island)
- Theretra insularis valens Jordan, 1926 (New Ireland)
