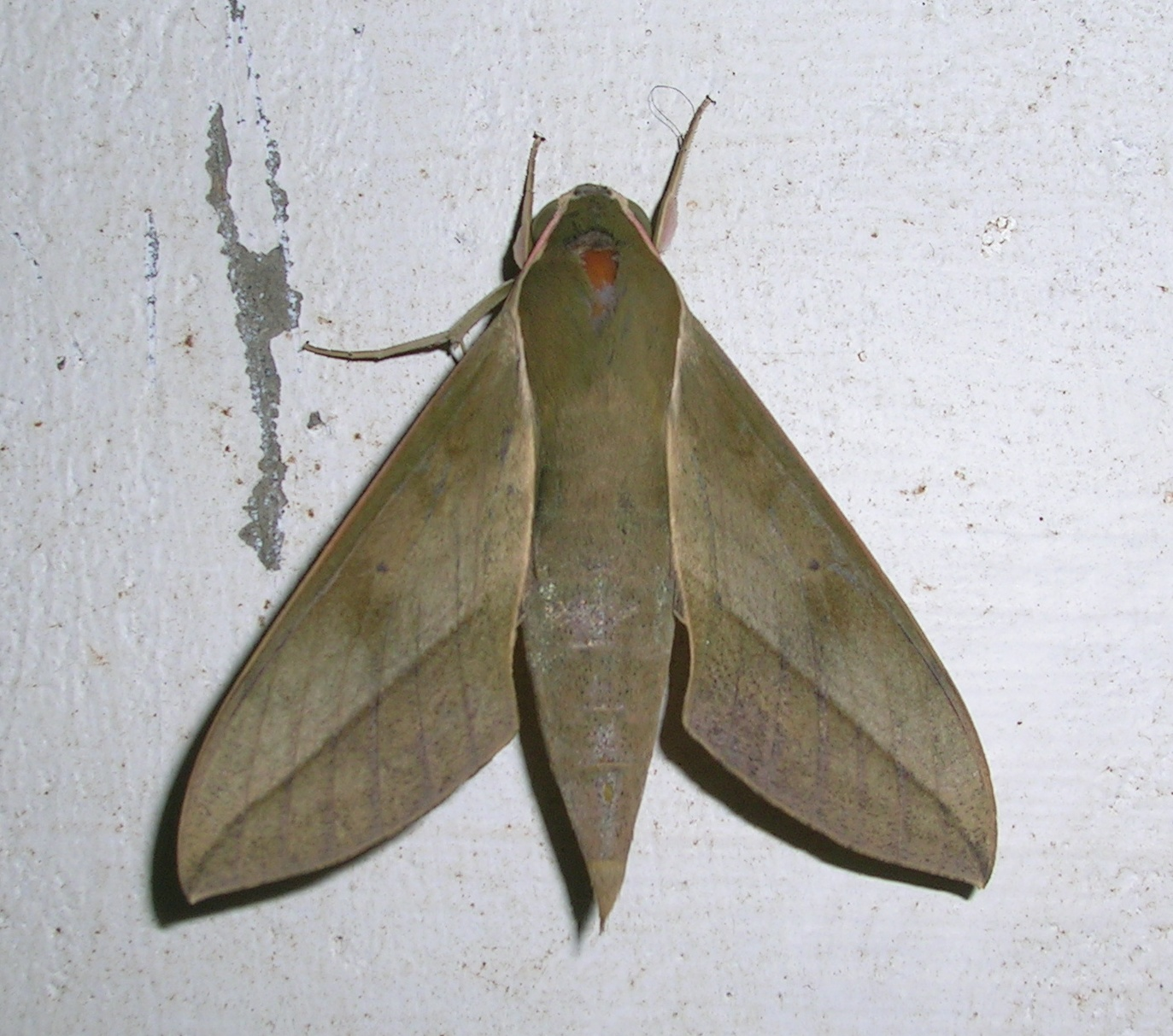
- From India

Scientific classification
- Kingdom: Animalia
- Phylum: Arthropoda
- Class: Insecta
- Order: Lepidoptera
- Family: Sphingidae
- Genus: Theretra
- Species: T. clotho

Binomial name
- Theretra clotho (Drury, 1773)

Synonyms
- Sphinx clotho Drury, 1773; Deilephila cyrene Westwood, 1847; Chaerocampa bistrigata Butler, 1875; Chaerocampa aspersata Kirby, 1877

= Theretra clotho =

Species of moth

Theretra clotho, the common hunter hawkmoth, is a moth of the family Sphingidae. It is found from Sri Lanka, India (including the Andaman Islands), Nepal and Myanmar, east through China to Taiwan, South Korea and Japan, and then south-east through South East Asia as far as the Lesser Sunda Islands and Timor in Indonesia.

== Description ==
The wingspan is 70–100 mm.

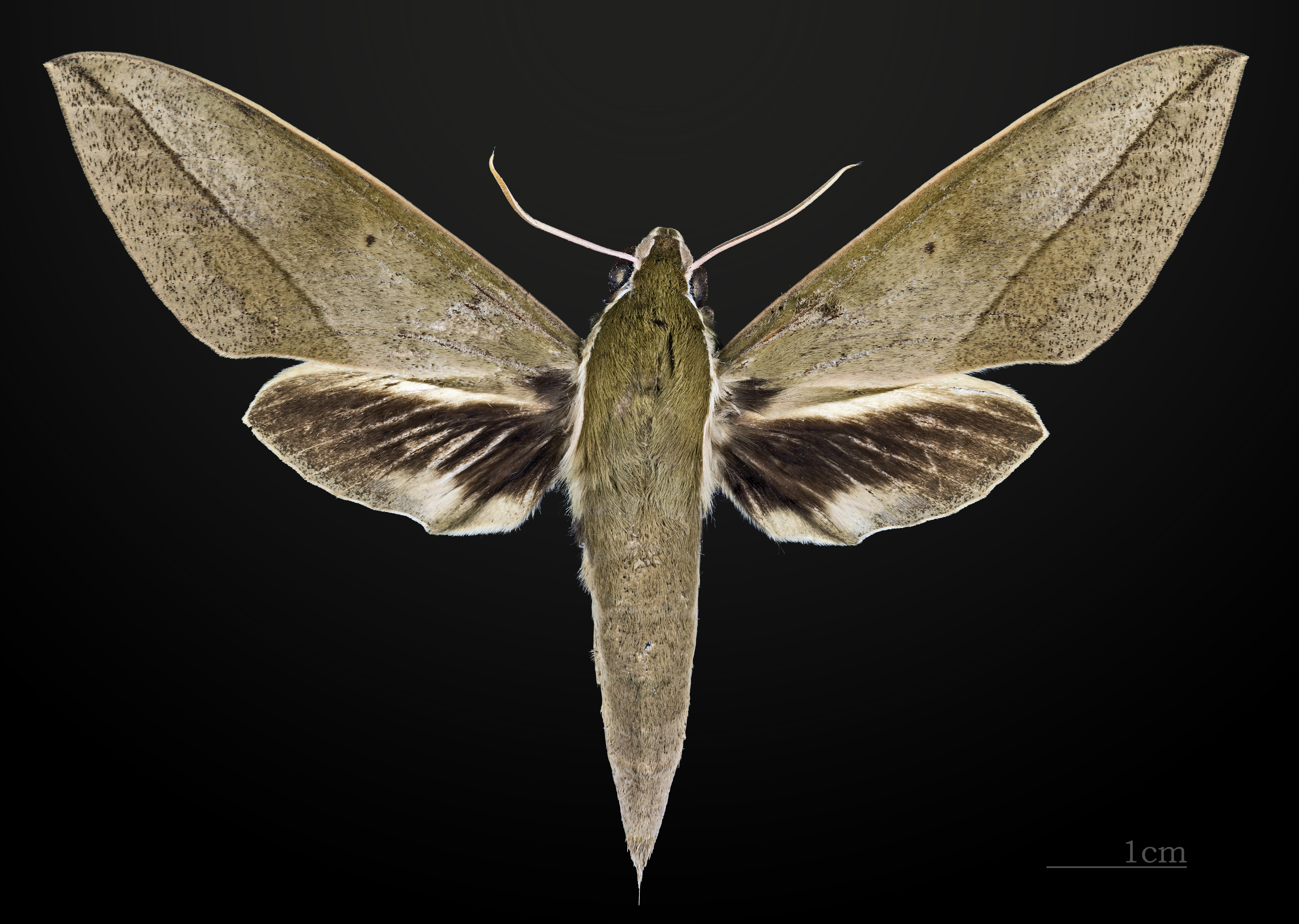
Male dorsal view

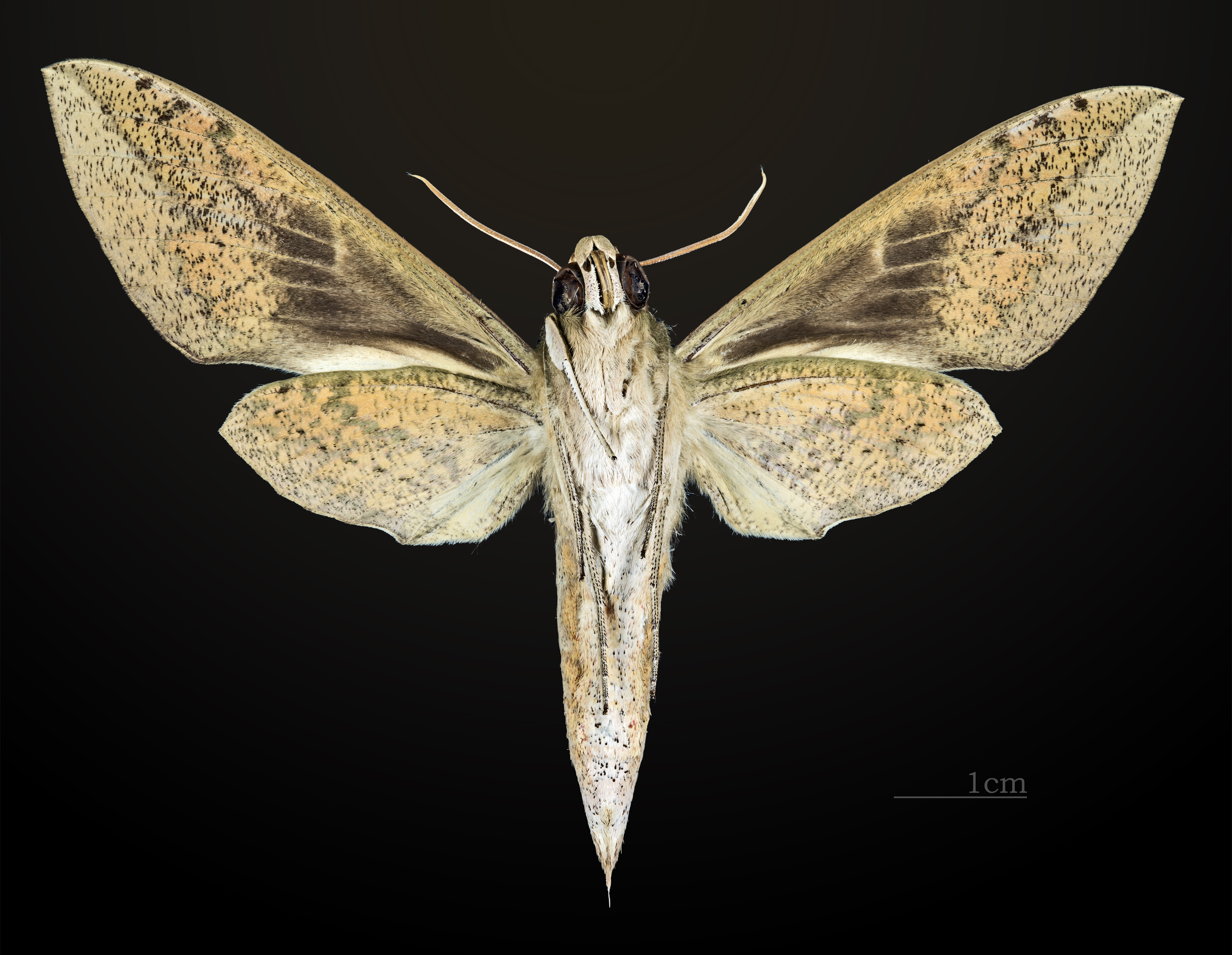
Male ventral view

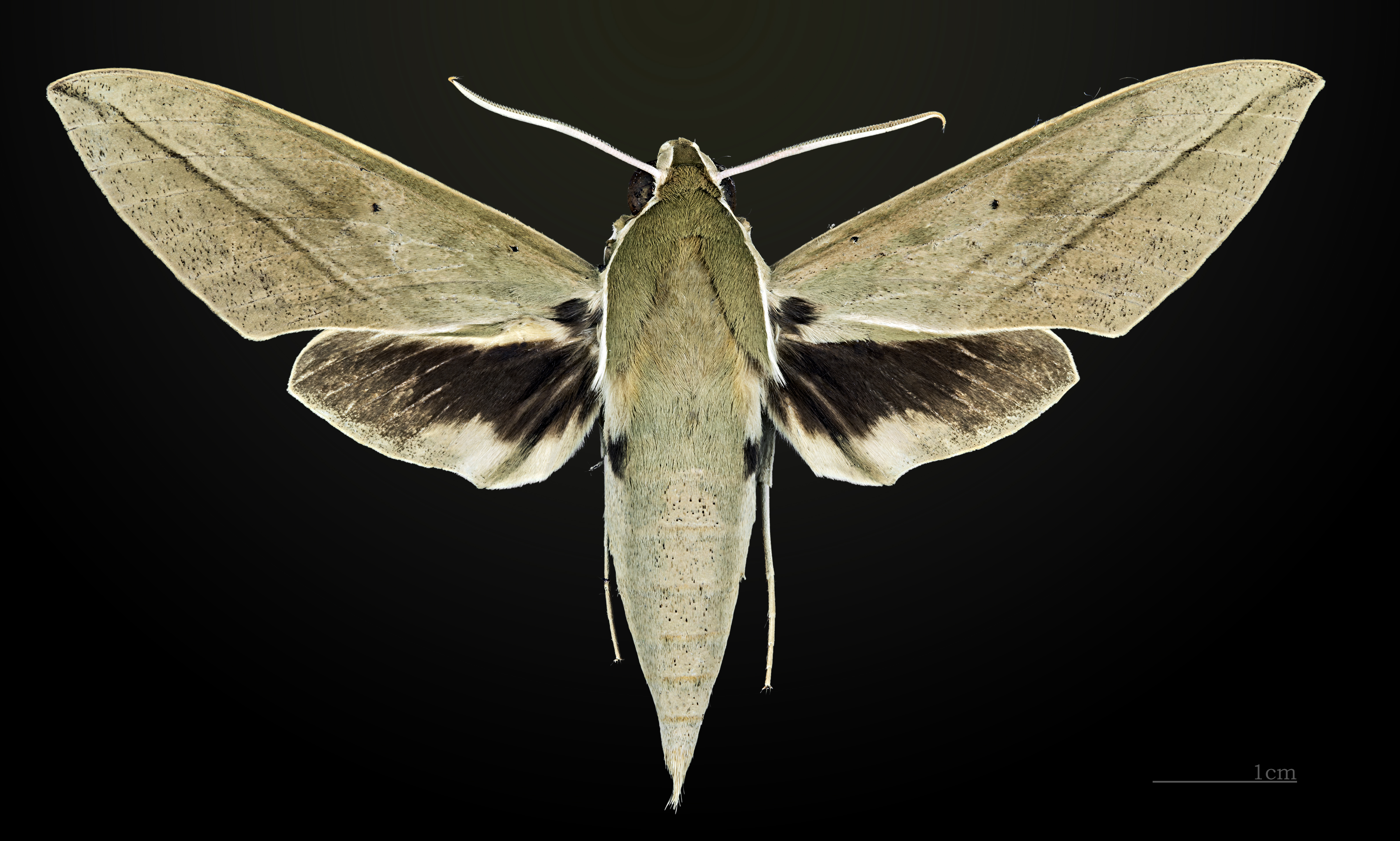
Female dorsal view

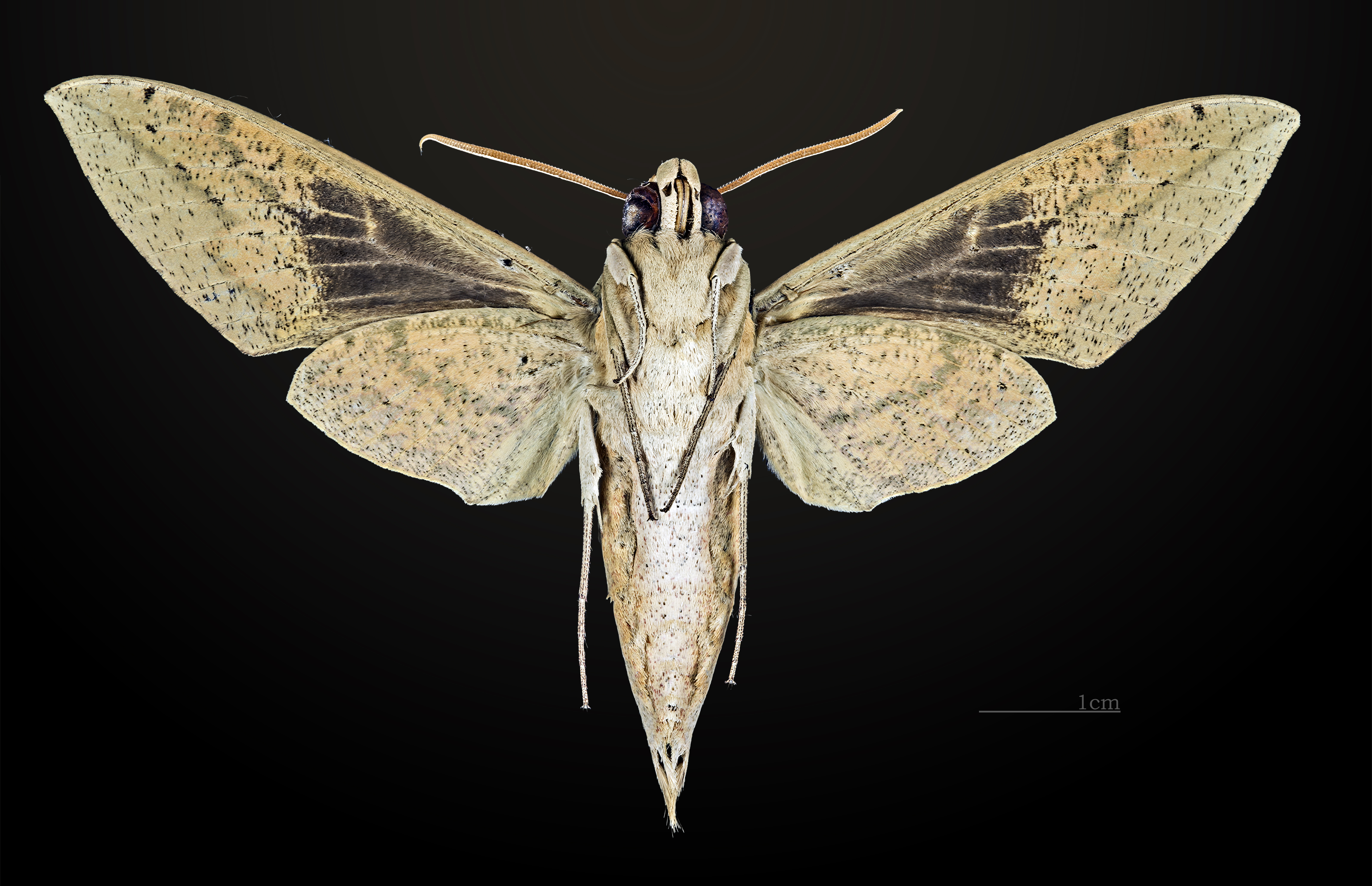
Female ventral view

== Biology ==
In Hong Kong, adults are on wing in multiple generations per year, with records from April to late October (peaks in mid-April, late May, mid-August and mid-October). In Korea, adults are on wing in August. In general though, adults are on wing from April or May to October throughout the southern range.

Larvae have been recorded feeding on Amorphophallus, Hibiscus, Parthenocissus, Saurauia and Vitis in Guangdong and Hong Kong. Other hosts include Cissus species, as well as Ampelopsis glandulosa in Japan and on Cissus hastata in Singapore. Elsewhere, other major host plant families include Actinidiaceae, Araceae, Begoniaceae, Dilleniaceae, Leeaceae, Malvaceae, Onagraceae, Urticaceae and Vitaceae.

== Subspecies ==
- Theretra clotho clotho
- Theretra clotho vincenti Vaglia & Liyous, 2010 (Philippines)
- Theretra clotho celata (Butler, 1877) (Moluccas east to Vanuatu and south to Australia)

== Gallery ==
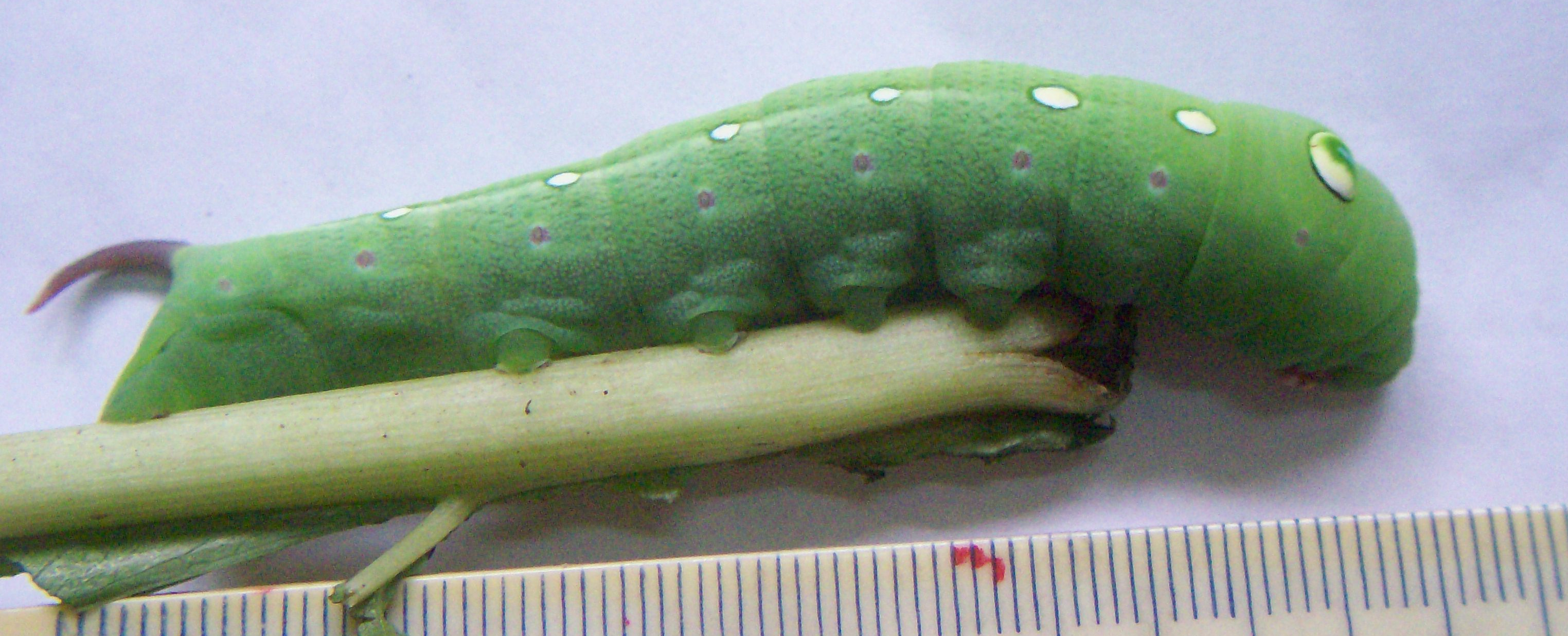
Larva (green form)

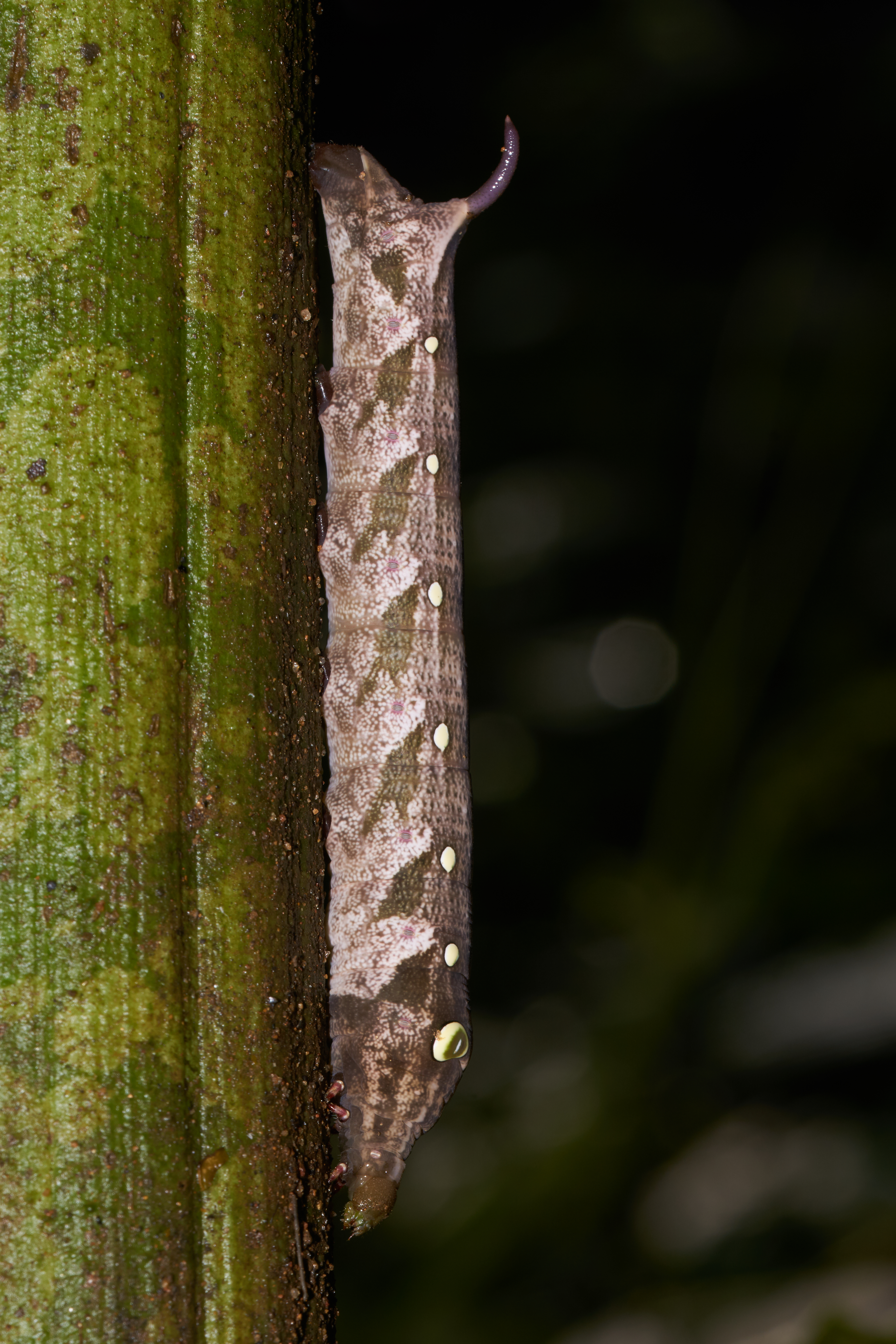
Larva (brown form)

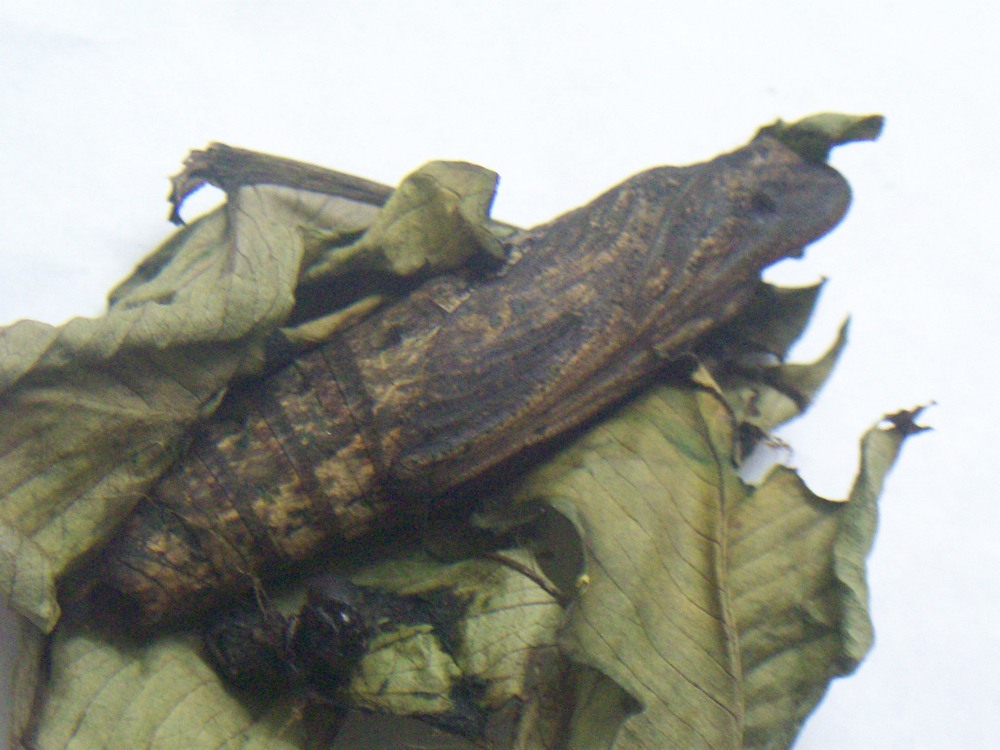
Pupa - the leaf surrounding the pupa was unwrapped.
