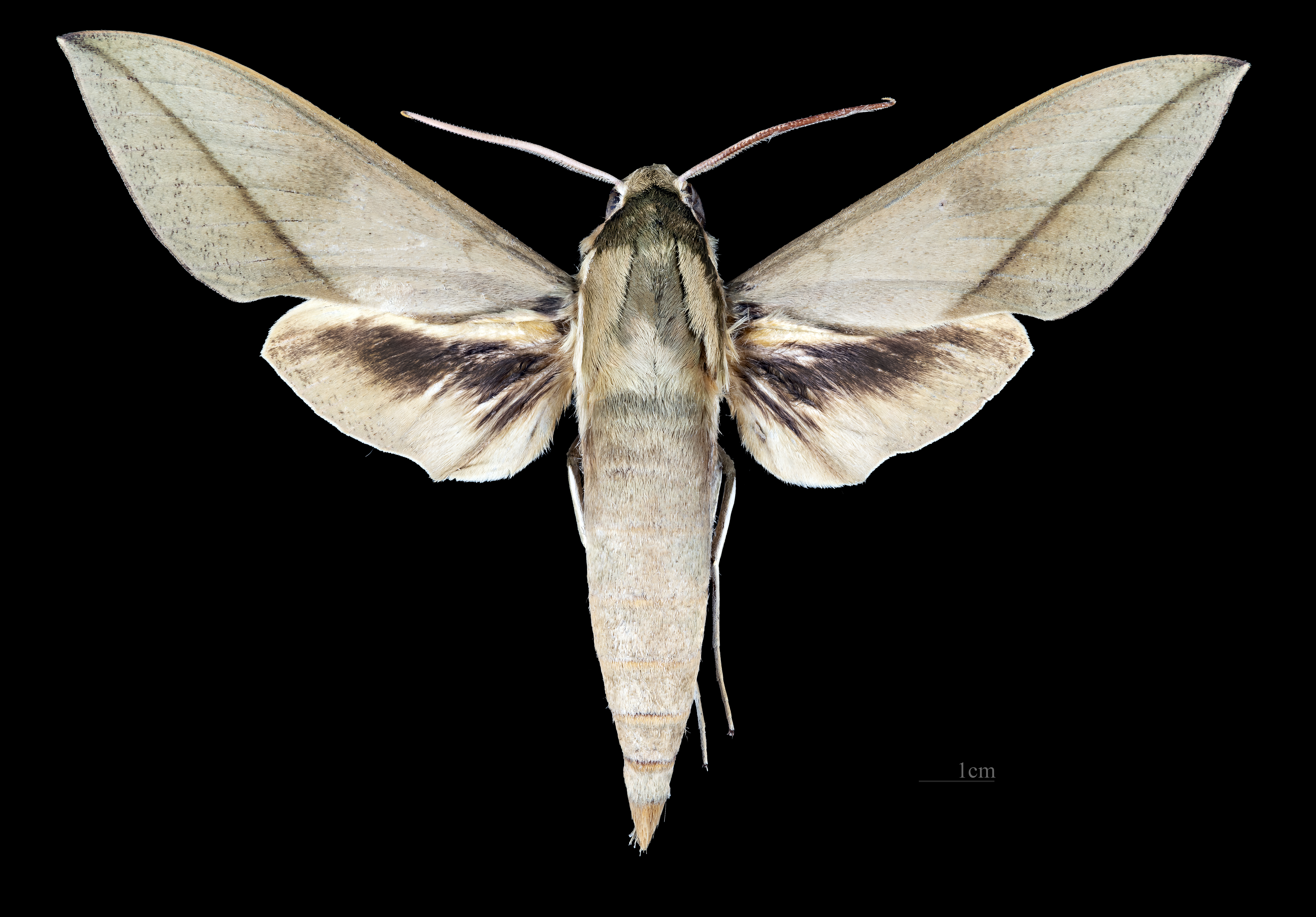
- Dorsal male
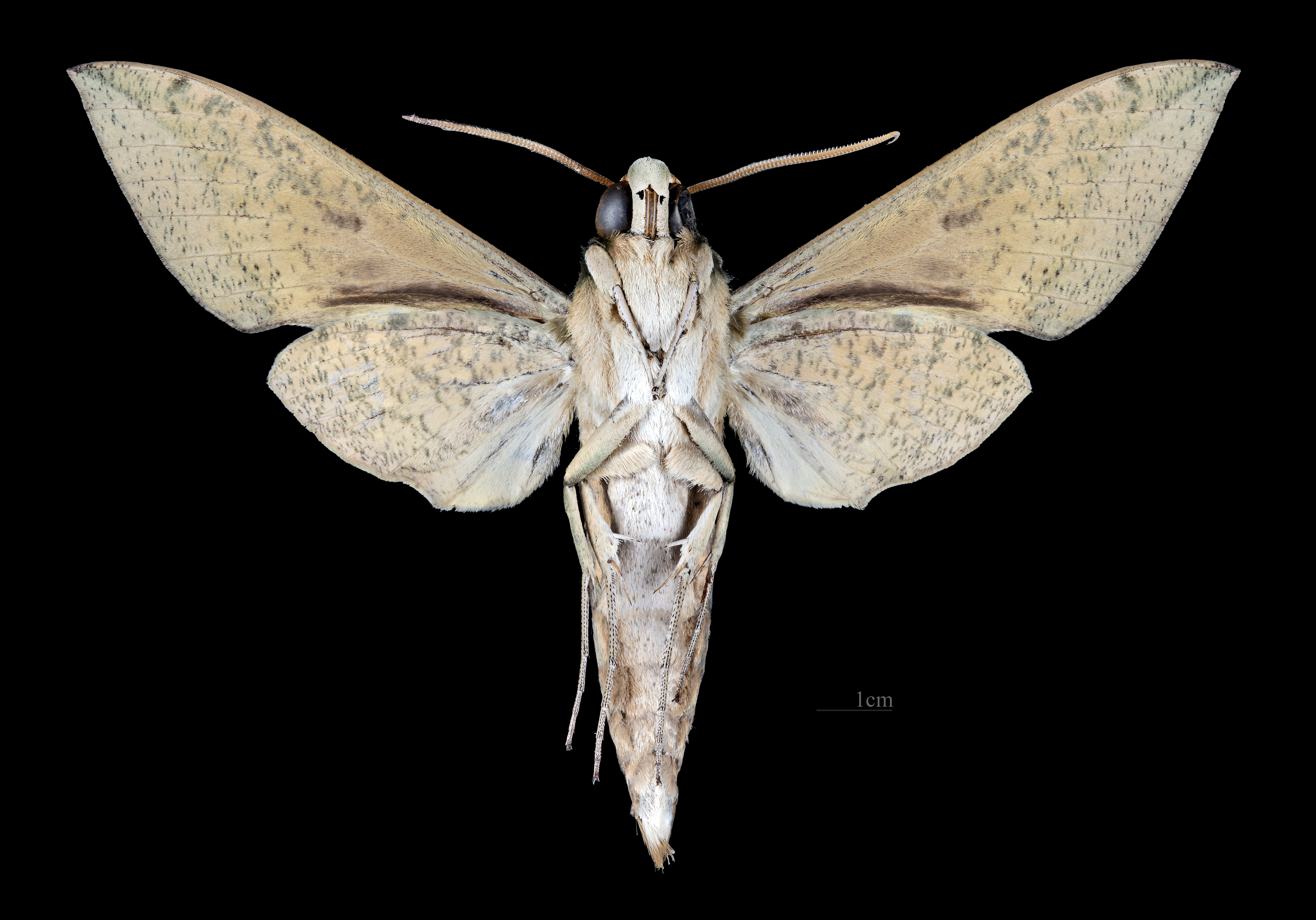
- Ventral male

Scientific classification
- Kingdom: Animalia
- Phylum: Arthropoda
- Class: Insecta
- Order: Lepidoptera
- Family: Sphingidae
- Genus: Theretra
- Species: T. celata

Binomial name
- Theretra celata (Butler, 1877)

Synonyms
- Chaerocampa celata Butler, 1877; Chaerocampa cloacina Miskin, 1891; Chaerocampa luteotincta Lucas, 1891; Theretra clotho celata (Butler, 1877)

= Theretra celata =

Species of moth

Theretra celata is a moth of the family Sphingidae. It is known from the Moluccas east to Vanuatu and south to Australia. It is often treated as a subspecies of Theretra clotho.

The length of the forewings is 35–42 mm for males and 41.5–48.9 mm for females. It is similar to Theretra clotho clotho, but overall tone generally more yellowish. The forewing underside has a blackish-brown area which is generally less extended than in Theretra clotho clotho. The hindwing upperside has a buff median band that is broader than in Theretra clotho clotho and extended more or less to the costal margin.

== Subspecies ==
- Theretra celata celata
- Theretra celata babarensis Eitschberger, 2005 (Moluccas)
