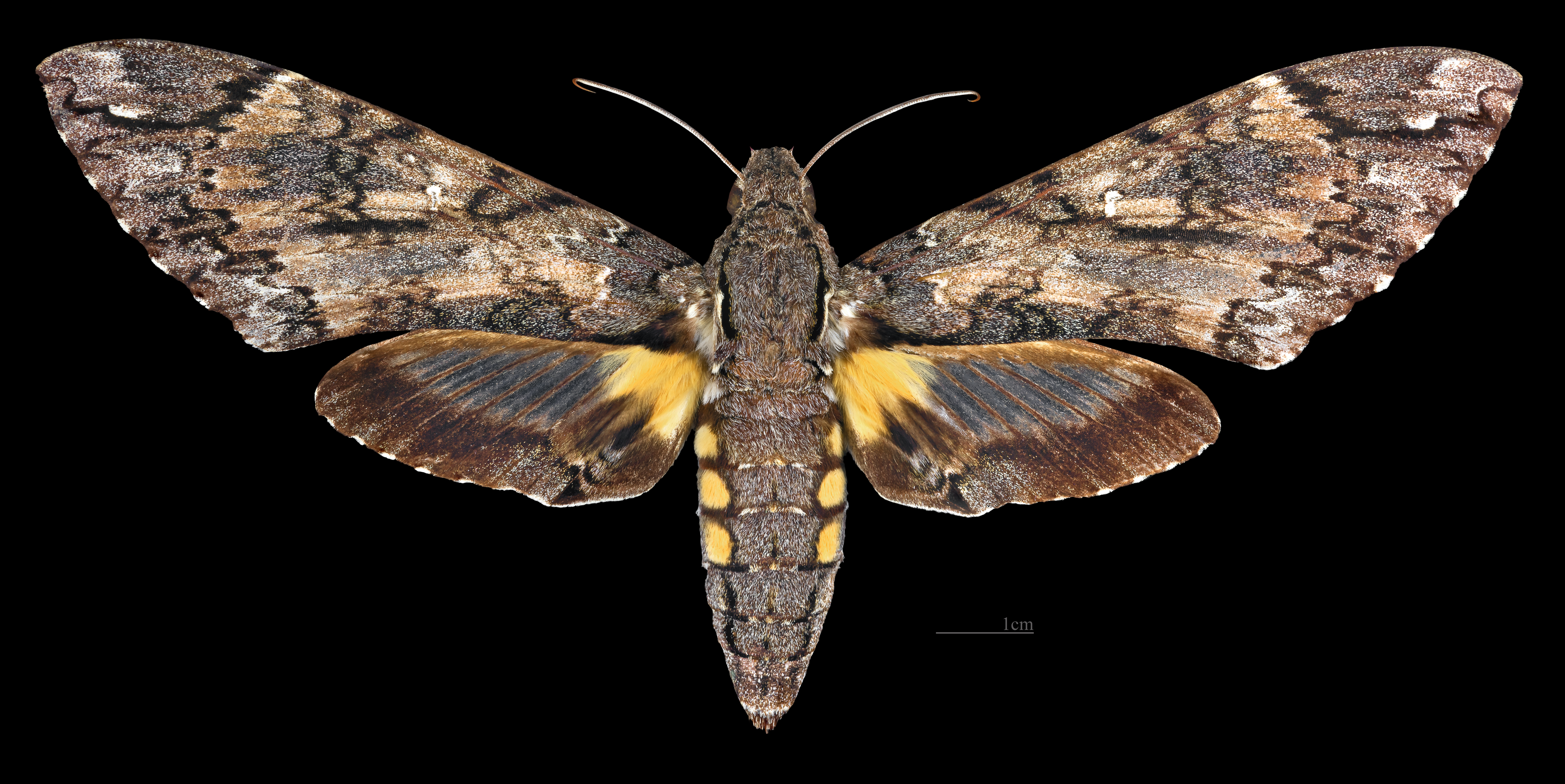
- Cocytius antaeus

Scientific classification
- Kingdom: Animalia
- Phylum: Arthropoda
- Clade: Pancrustacea
- Class: Insecta
- Order: Lepidoptera
- Family: Sphingidae
- Tribe: Sphingini
- Genus: Cocytius; Hübner, 1819

Synonyms
- Ancistrognathus Wallengren, 1858

= Cocytius =

Genus of moths

Cocytius is a genus of hawkmoths (family Sphingidae). The genus was erected by Jacob Hübner in 1819.

== Species ==
As of February 2021, the Sphingidae Taxonomic Inventory accepts eight species. The genera Amphonyx, Ancistrognathus, Morcocytius and Pseudococytius are treated as synonyms.

- Cocytius antaeus (Drury, 1773)
- Cocytius beelzebuth (Boisduval, [1875])
- Cocytius duponchel (Poey, 1832)
- Cocytius haxairei Cadiou, 2006
- Cocytius lucifer (Rothschild & Jordan, 1903)
- Cocytius mephisto Haxaire & Vaglia, 2002
- Cocytius mortuorum Rothschild & Jordan, 1903
- Cocytius vitrinus Rothschild & Jordan, 1903
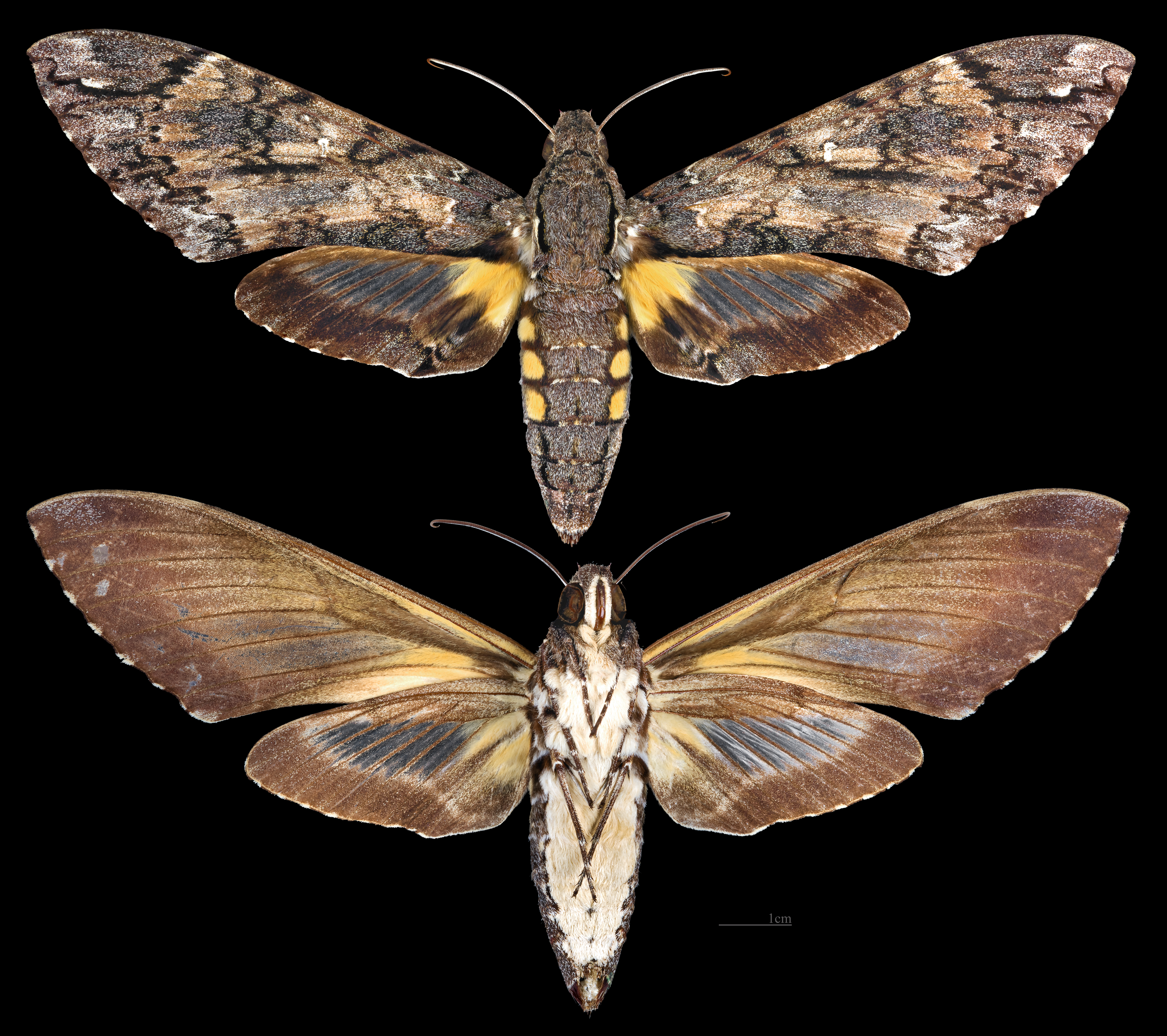
Cocytius antaeus

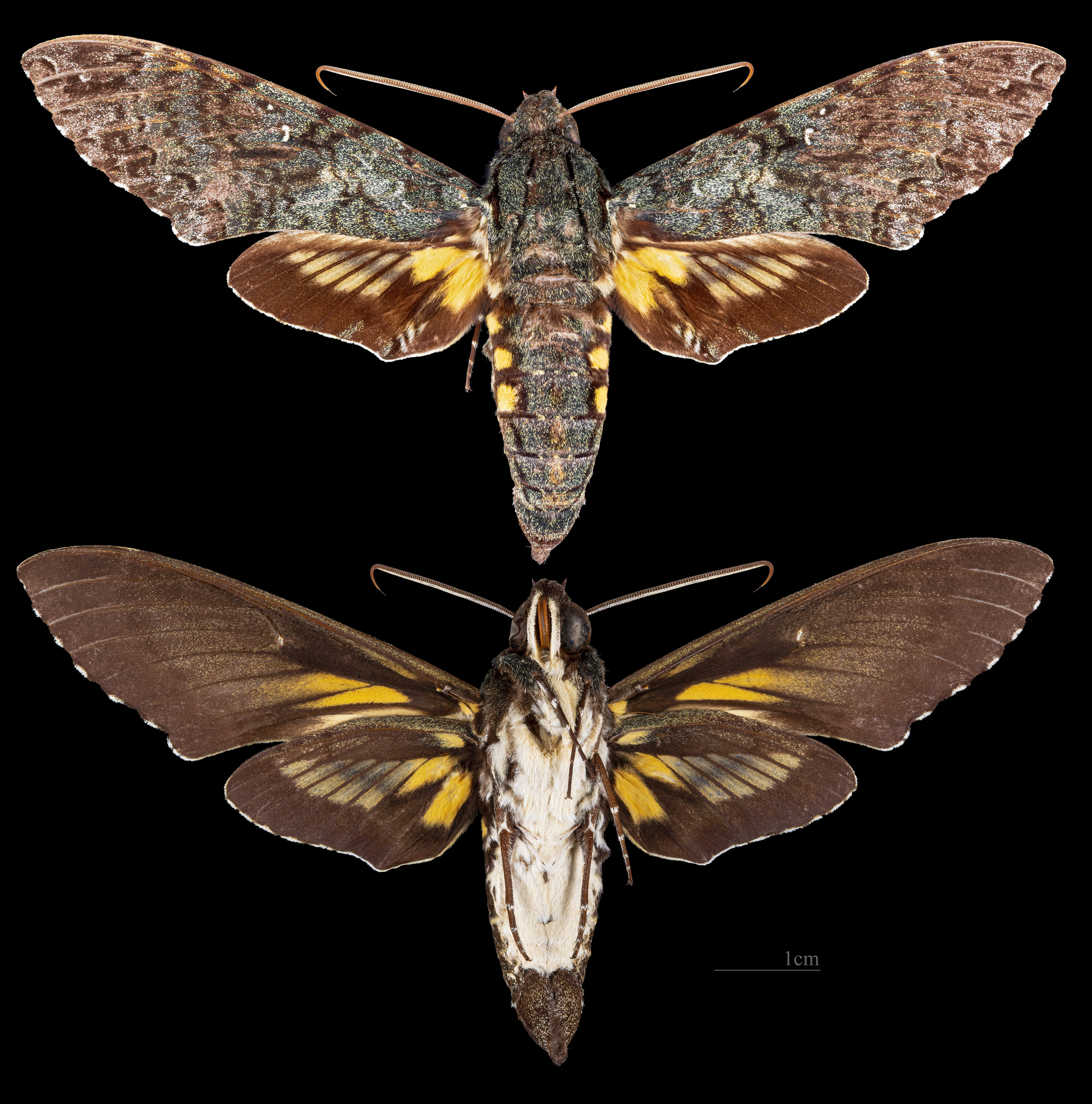
Cocytius duponchel
