= Soncoya =

Soncoya is a common name for several trees with edible fruit and may refer to:

- Annona macroprophyllata
- Annona purpurea
