= C. mortuorum =

C. mortuorum may refer to:

- Cocytius mortuorum, a hawkmoth species in the genus Cocytius
- Cynomya mortuorum, a fly species

== See also ==
- Mortuorum
