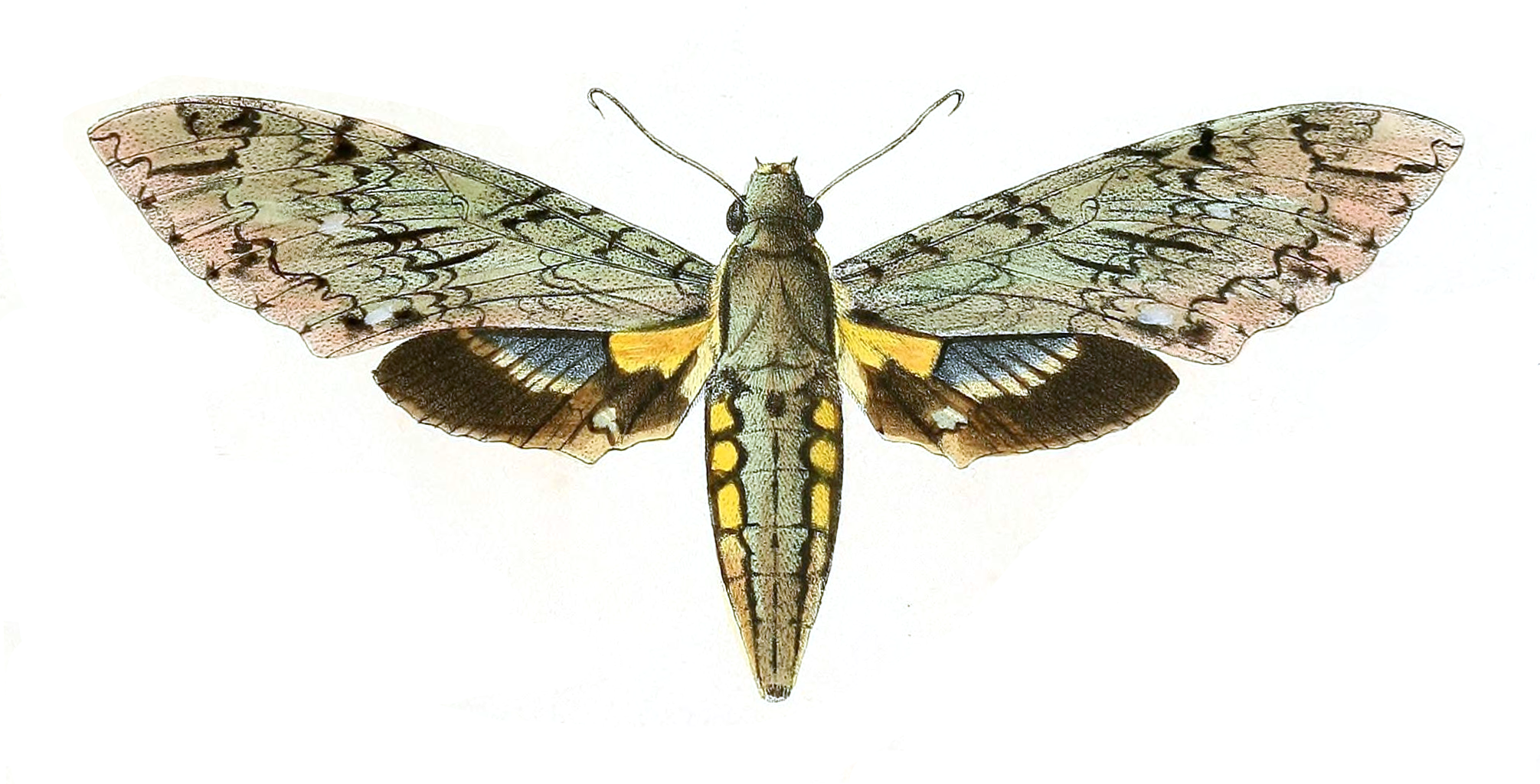

Scientific classification
- Domain: Eukaryota
- Kingdom: Animalia
- Phylum: Arthropoda
- Class: Insecta
- Order: Lepidoptera
- Family: Sphingidae
- Genus: Amphonyx
- Species: A. rivularis

Binomial name
- Amphonyx rivularis Butler, 1875

Synonyms
- Amphonyx godartii Boisduval, 1875; Cocytius affinis Rothschild, 1894

= Amphonyx rivularis =

Species of moth

Amphonyx rivularis is a moth of the family Sphingidae. It is known from southern Brazil.

The wingspan is 110–150 mm, with males being much smaller than females.

Adults are on wing year round. They nectar at flowers.

The larvae feed on Guatteria diospyroides, Annona purpurea, Annona reticulata, Xylopia frutescens and Annona glabra and probably other Annonaceae species. They are very colourful.
