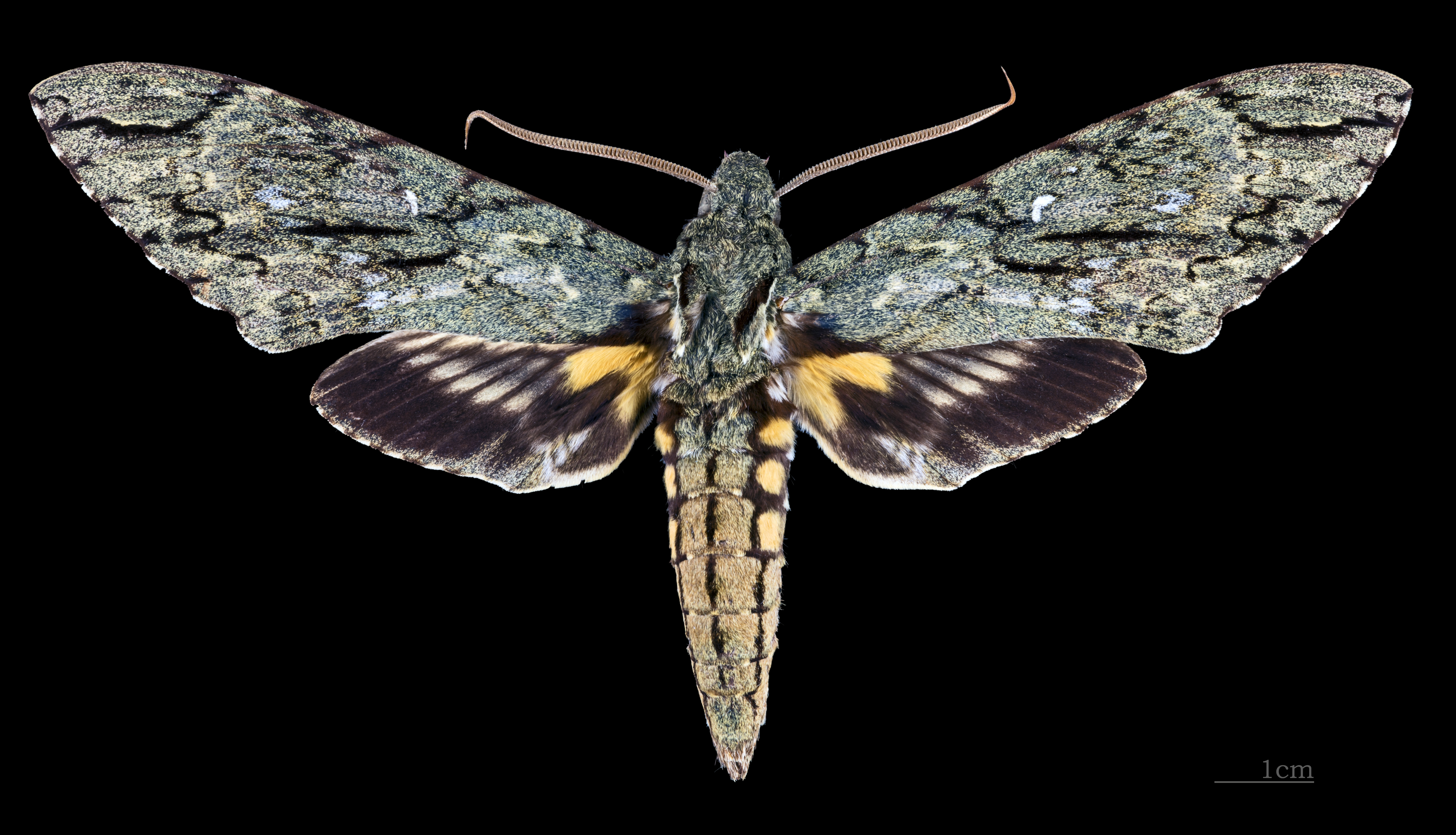
- Upperside
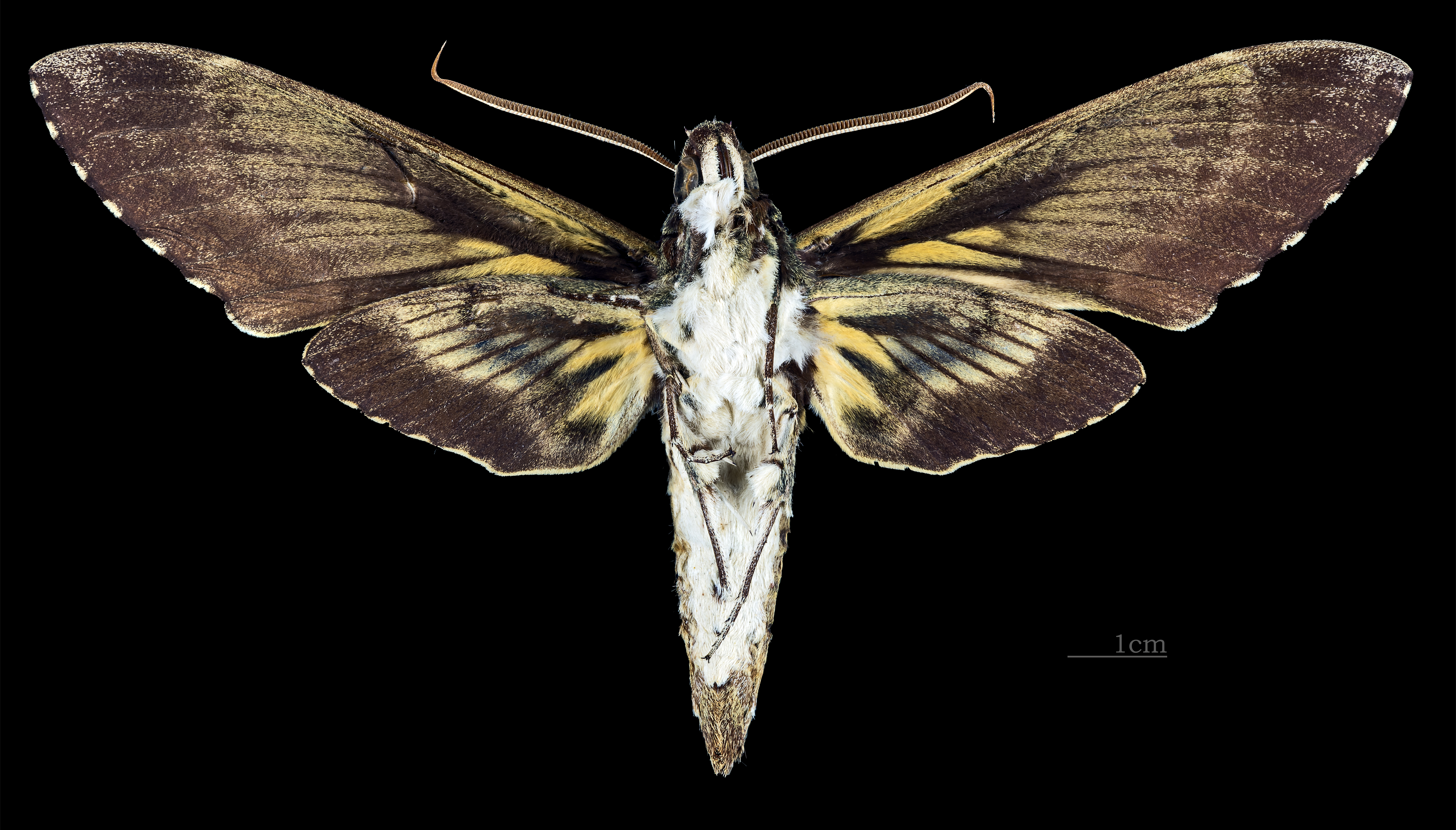
- Underside

Scientific classification
- Domain: Eukaryota
- Kingdom: Animalia
- Phylum: Arthropoda
- Class: Insecta
- Order: Lepidoptera
- Family: Sphingidae
- Genus: Cocytius
- Species: C. lucifer

Binomial name
- Cocytius lucifer (Rothschild & Jordan, 1903)

Synonyms
- Amphonyx lucifer Rothschild & Jordan, 1903; Cocytius macasensis Clark, 1922; Cocytius lucifer lindneri Gehlen, 1944; Cocytius morgani Boisduval, 1875

= Cocytius lucifer =

Species of moth

Cocytius lucifer is a moth of the family Sphingidae first described by Walter Rothschild and Karl Jordan in 1903.

== Distribution ==
It is found in tropical and subtropical lowlands from Mexico, Belize, Guatemala, Nicaragua and Costa Rica, south through Venezuela to Brazil, Bolivia, Argentina and Ecuador.

== Description ==
The wingspan is 140–160 mm.

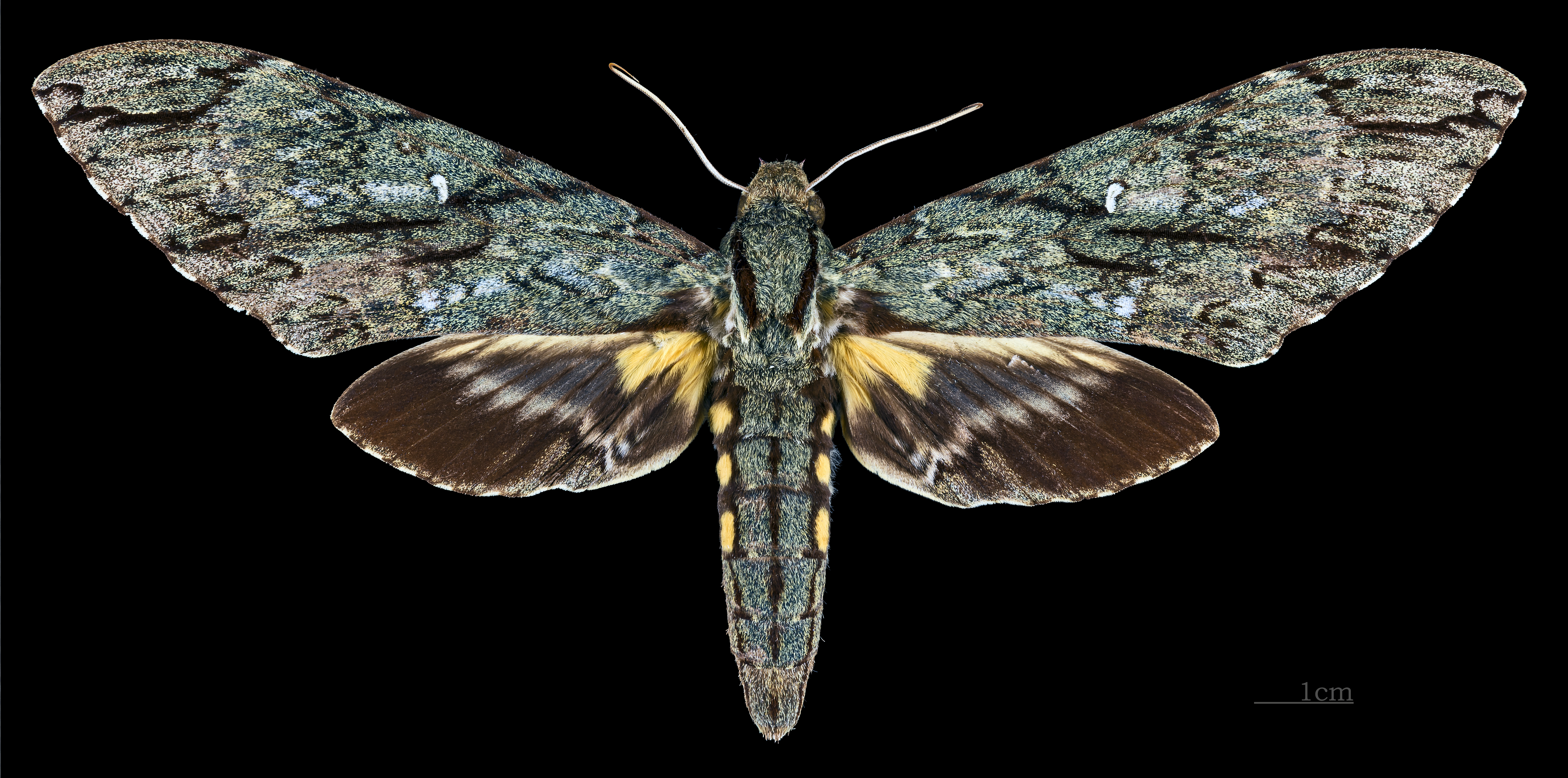
Female, upperside

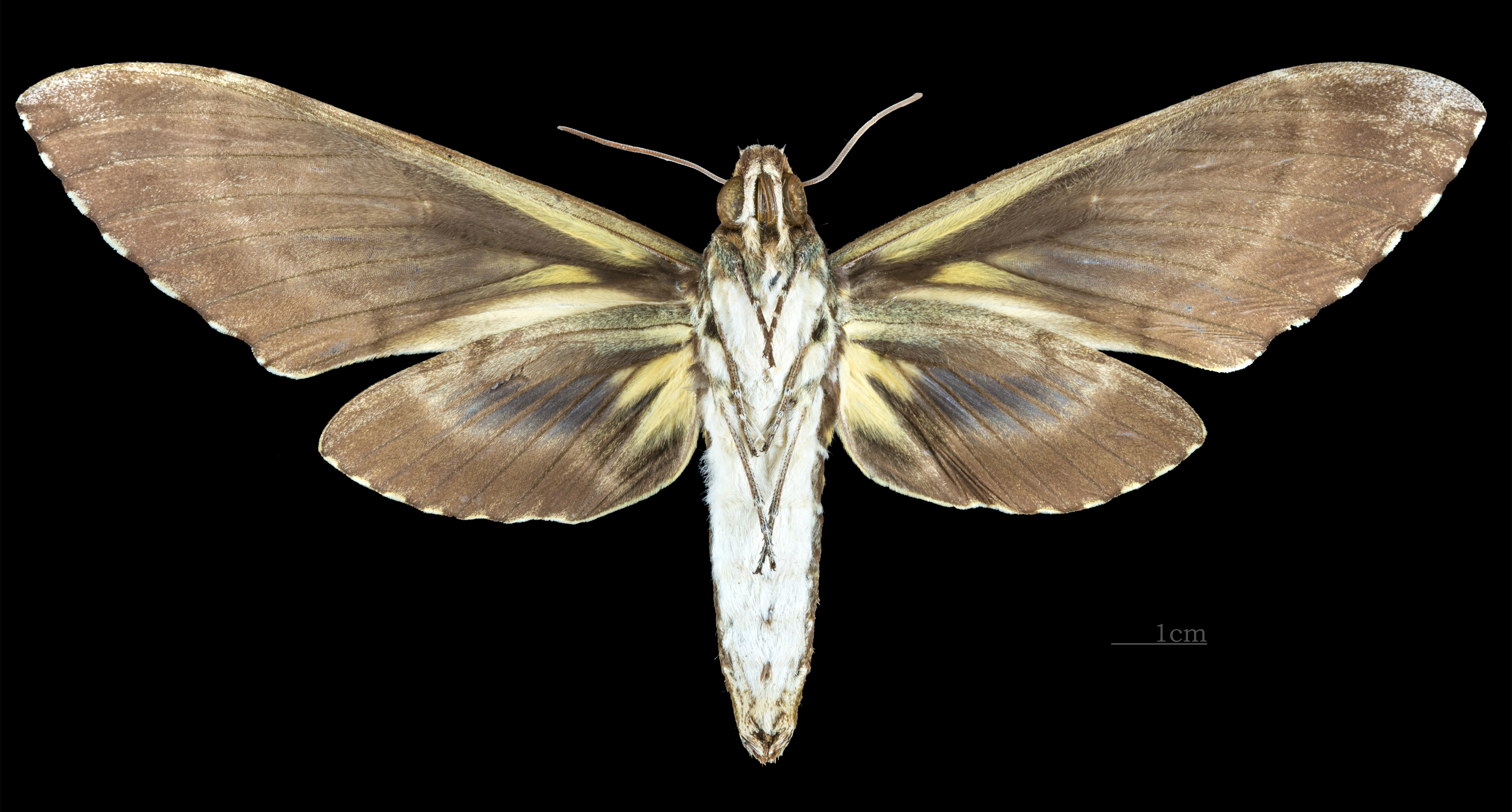
Female, underside

== Biology ==
Adults are on wing year round.

The larvae feed on Annona purpurea and Desmopsis schippii and probably other Annonaceae species. They are clear green and white or blue-green. The prepupa is green with a rose stripe down its back.

The adults pollinate Ruellia humilis (Acanthaceae), Schubertia grandiflora (Asclepiadaceae), Caryocar brasiliensis (Caryocaraceae), Bauhinia holophylla (Fabaceae), Inga vera (Fabaceae), Luehea divaricata (Malvaceae), Guettarda viburnoides (Rubiaceae), Tocoyena formosa (Rubiaceae) and Qualea grandiflora (Vochysiaceae).
