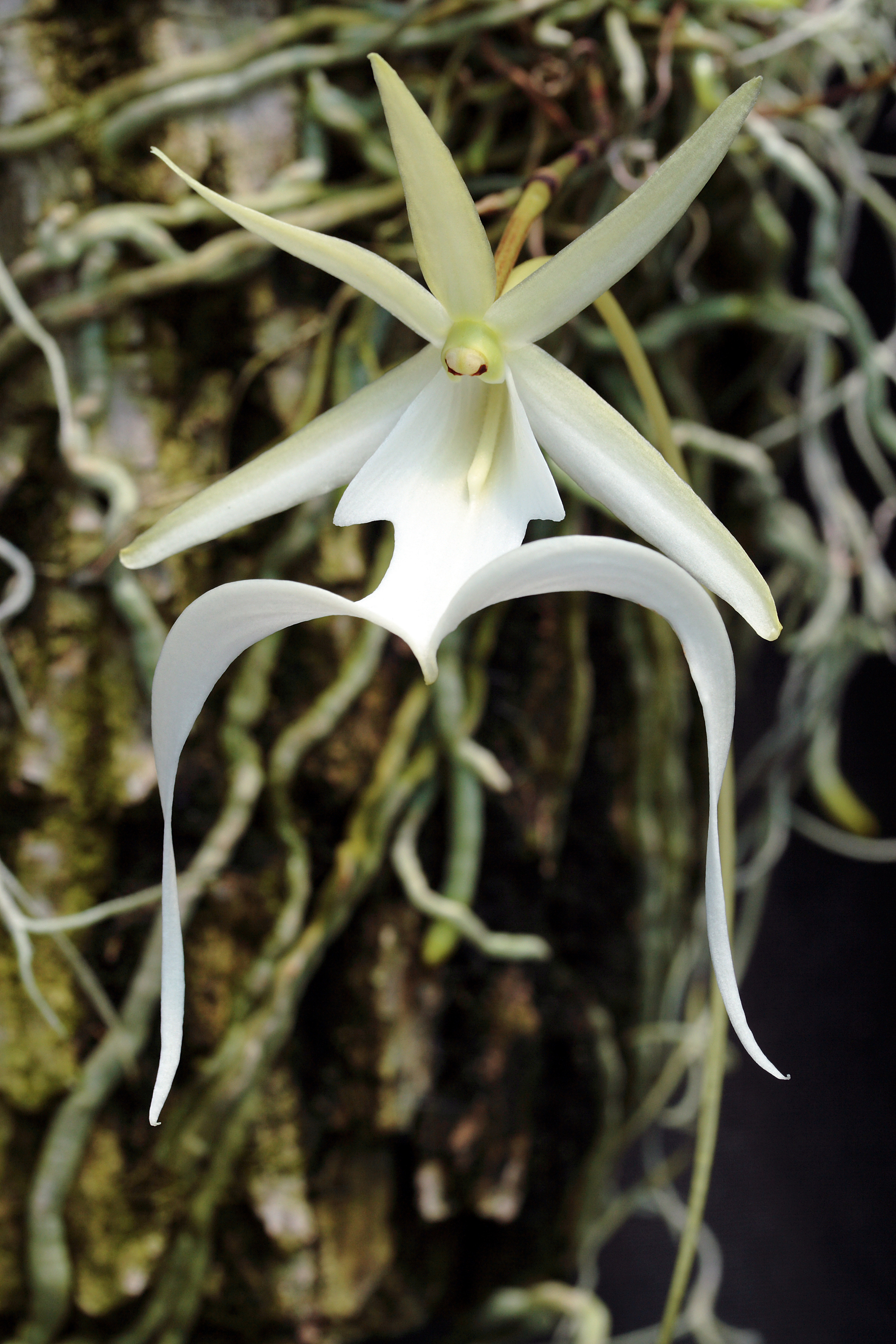
- Dendrophylax lindenii

Scientific classification
- Kingdom: Plantae
- Clade: Tracheophytes
- Clade: Angiosperms
- Clade: Monocots
- Order: Asparagales
- Family: Orchidaceae
- Subfamily: Epidendroideae
- Tribe: Vandeae
- Subtribe: Angraecinae
- Genus: Dendrophylax; Rchb.f.

Synonyms
- Harrisella Fawc. & Rendle; Polyradicion Garay; Polyrrhiza Pfitzer in H.G.A.Engler & K.A.E.Prantl

= Dendrophylax =

Dendrophylax Temporal range: 8.21 –0 Ma Late Miocene – Recent

Genus of orchids

Dendrophylax is a genus of leafless neotropical orchids (family Orchidaceae) native to Mexico, Central America, the West Indies, and Florida. The name is from Greek δένδρον ("tree") and φύλαξ ("guard; keeper"). One species, Dendrophylax lindenii, is featured heavily in the book The Orchid Thief.

== Biology ==
The plants of this genus are unusual in that they consist of masses of photosynthetic roots anchored in trees with a highly reduced stem and ephemeral leaves which have been reduced to scales. The bulk of these plants consists only of flat, cord-like, green roots with distinctive "track marks". These white track marks are called pneumatodes and function in much the same manner as stomata allowing the photosynthetic roots to perform gas exchange to support photosynthesis.

=== Phylogeny ===
Members of this genus are distant relatives of the African and Indian Ocean genus Angraecum; it seems that orchid seed, blowing like dust, crossed the Atlantic at least once and successfully colonized new habitat. Current evidence derived from molecular studies indicates that the original arrival from Africa which spawned this genus and the related genus Harriselia was a member of the subtribe Angraecineae with small leaves and flowers and a monopodial growth habit, and the leafless habit developed in parallel in both Africa and the Caribbean, since the genes are present in all members of the subtribe Angraecineae and the leafless habit is common in several genera within the Vandeae (Chilochista, Dendrophylax, Harriselia, and Microcoelia).

=== Cultivation ===
Several species such as Dendrophylax funalis, Dendrophylax fawcetti, and Dendrophylax lindenii produce large, showy, white flowers which are highly fragrant and described as smelling fruity and reminiscent of an apple. Most members of this genus are pollinated by various species of moths with very long probosces and the flowers of most species within this genus possess very long nectar spurs ranging from 4 to 8 inches in length on average. The giant sphinx moth is known to pollinate several species within this genus.

Dendrophylax funalis is more commonly and easily cultivated than other members of the genus and the plants tend to get very large and robust in both habitat and cultivation. Other members of this genus are very difficult subjects in cultivation such as Dendrophylax lindenii, and some members of this genus defy cultivation or are of little interest to orchid enthusiasts because they produce very small flowers.

== Species ==
As of March 2026, Plants of the World Online accepts 15 species.

1. Dendrophylax alcoa Dod – Dominican Republic
2. Dendrophylax barrettiae Fawc. & Rendle – Dominican Republic, Haiti, Jamaica, Cuba
3. Dendrophylax constanzensis (Garay) Nir – Dominican Republic
4. Dendrophylax fawcetti Rolfe – Grand Cayman Island
5. Dendrophylax filiformis (Sw.) Benth. ex Fawc. – Dominican Republic, Haiti, Jamaica, Cuba, Puerto Rico
6. Dendrophylax funalis (Sw.) Benth. ex Rolfe – Jamaica
7. Dendrophylax gracilis (Cogn.) Garay – Cuba
8. Dendrophylax helorrhiza Dod – Dominican Republic
9. Dendrophylax lindenii (Lindl.) Benth. ex Rolfe – Florida, Cuba
10. Dendrophylax macrocarpus (Dod) Carlsward & Whitten – Dominican Republic
11. Dendrophylax megarhizus Molgo & Carnevali – southern Mexico
12. Dendrophylax porrectus (Rchb.f.) Carlsward & Whitten – Mexico, El Salvador, Guatemala, Florida, Cayman Islands, Cuba, Hispaniola, Jamaica, Puerto Rico
13. Dendrophylax sallei (Rchb.f.) Benth. ex Rolfe – Dominican Republic
14. Dendrophylax serpentilingua (Dod) Nir – Dominican Republic
15. Dendrophylax varius (Aubl.) Urb. – Cuba, Haiti
