= Amphonyx duponchel =

Duponchel's sphinx
- male

Scientific classification
- Kingdom: Animalia
- Phylum: Arthropoda
- Clade: Pancrustacea
- Class: Insecta
- Order: Lepidoptera
- Family: Sphingidae
- Genus: Amphonyx
- Species: A. duponchel

Binomial name
- Amphonyx duponchel Poey, 1832

Synonyms
- Cocytius duponchel Poey, 1832; Cocytius duponchel roseus Gehlen, 1928

Species of moth

Amphonyx duponchel, or Duponchel's sphinx, is a moth of the family Sphingidae. The species was first described by Felipe Poey in 1832.

== Distribution ==
It is found in tropical and subtropical lowlands in Cuba and the West Indies and from Bolivia, southern Brazil and Argentina to Venezuela, Belize, Guatemala, Nicaragua, Costa Rica and Mexico. It is also found in Florida and Texas, where it is rare.

== Description ==
The wingspan is 110–150 mm, with the males being much smaller than the females. There are black discal dashes and a transverse, kidney-shaped, dirty white discal spot located on the forewing upperside.

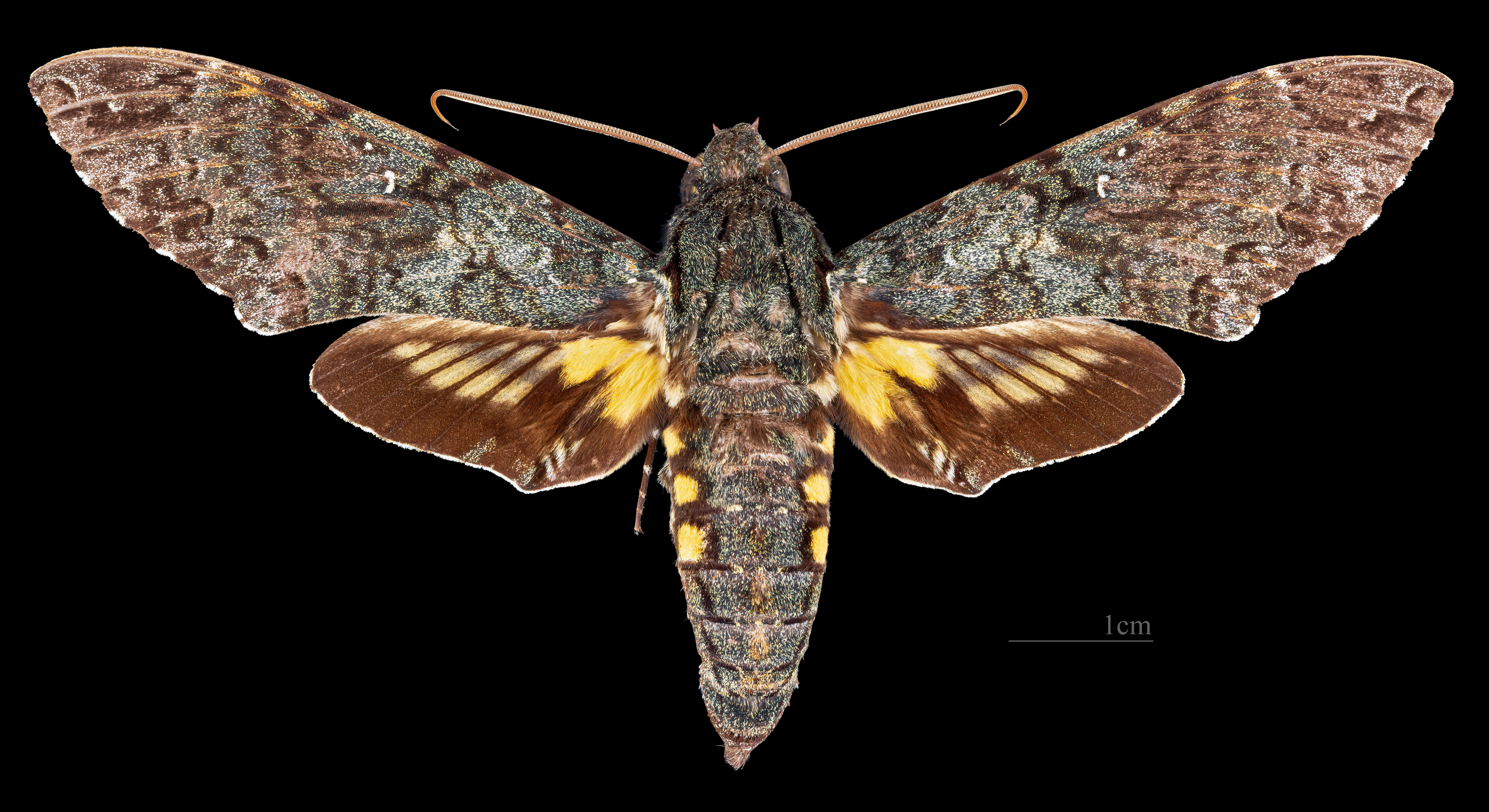
Male dorsal side

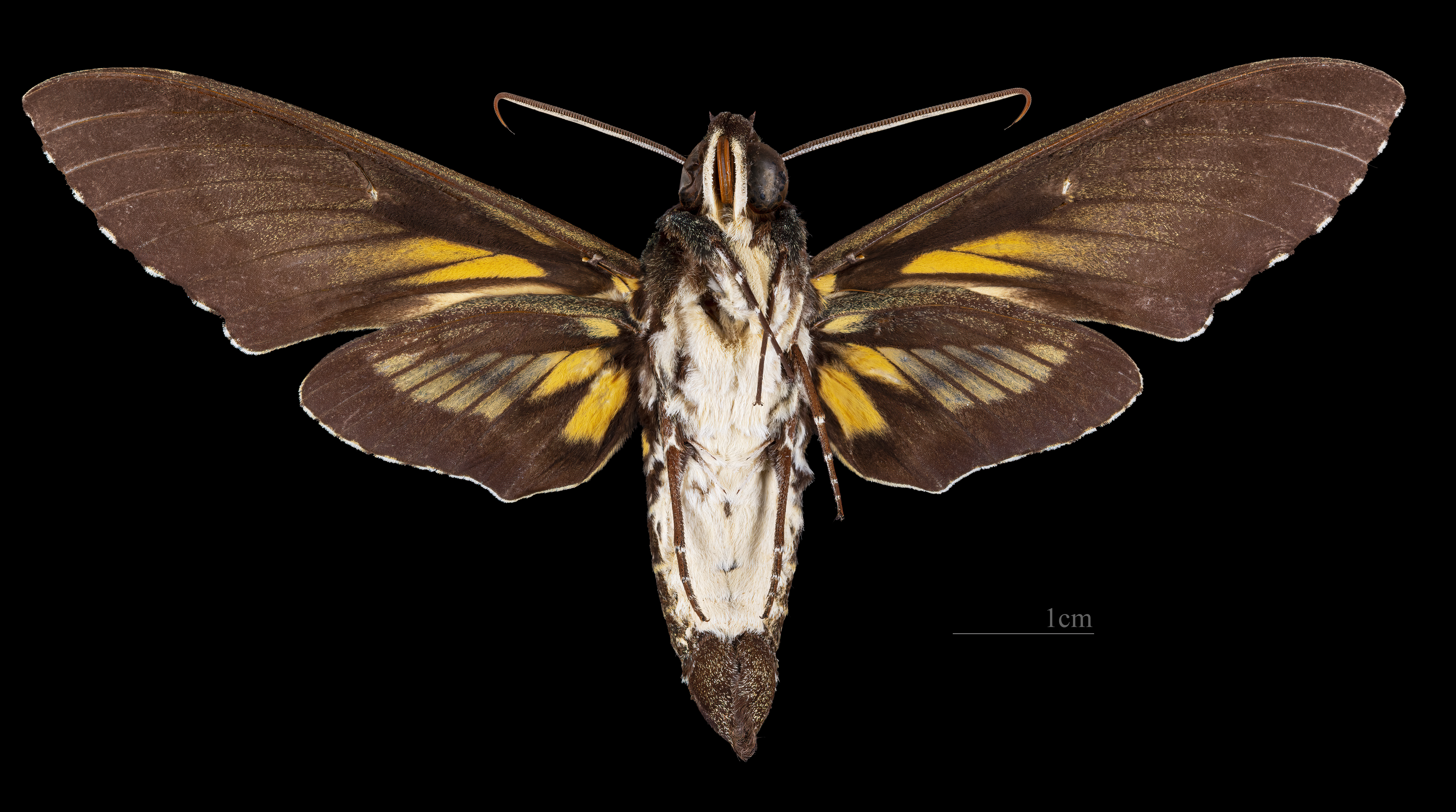
Male ventral

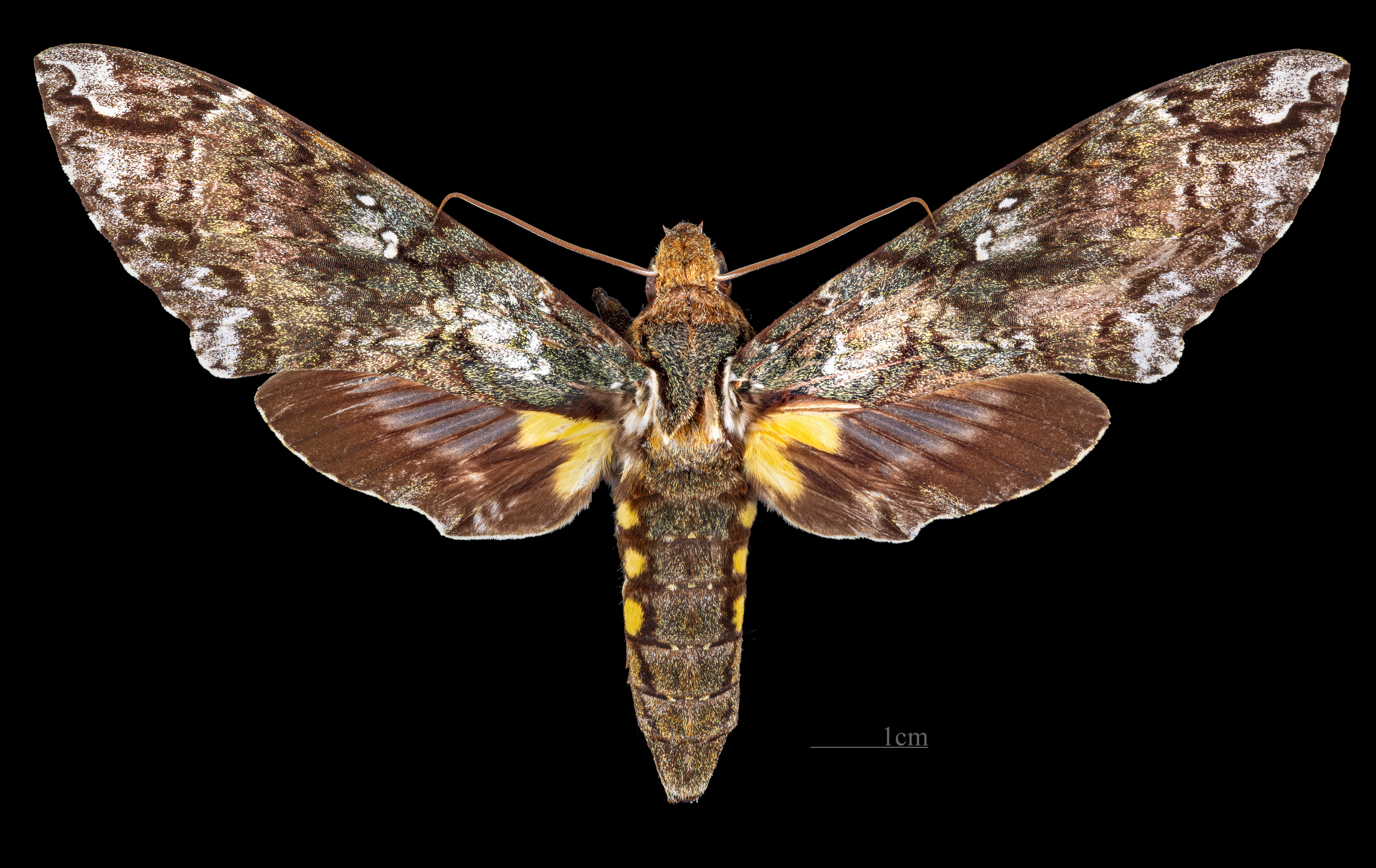
Female dorsal side

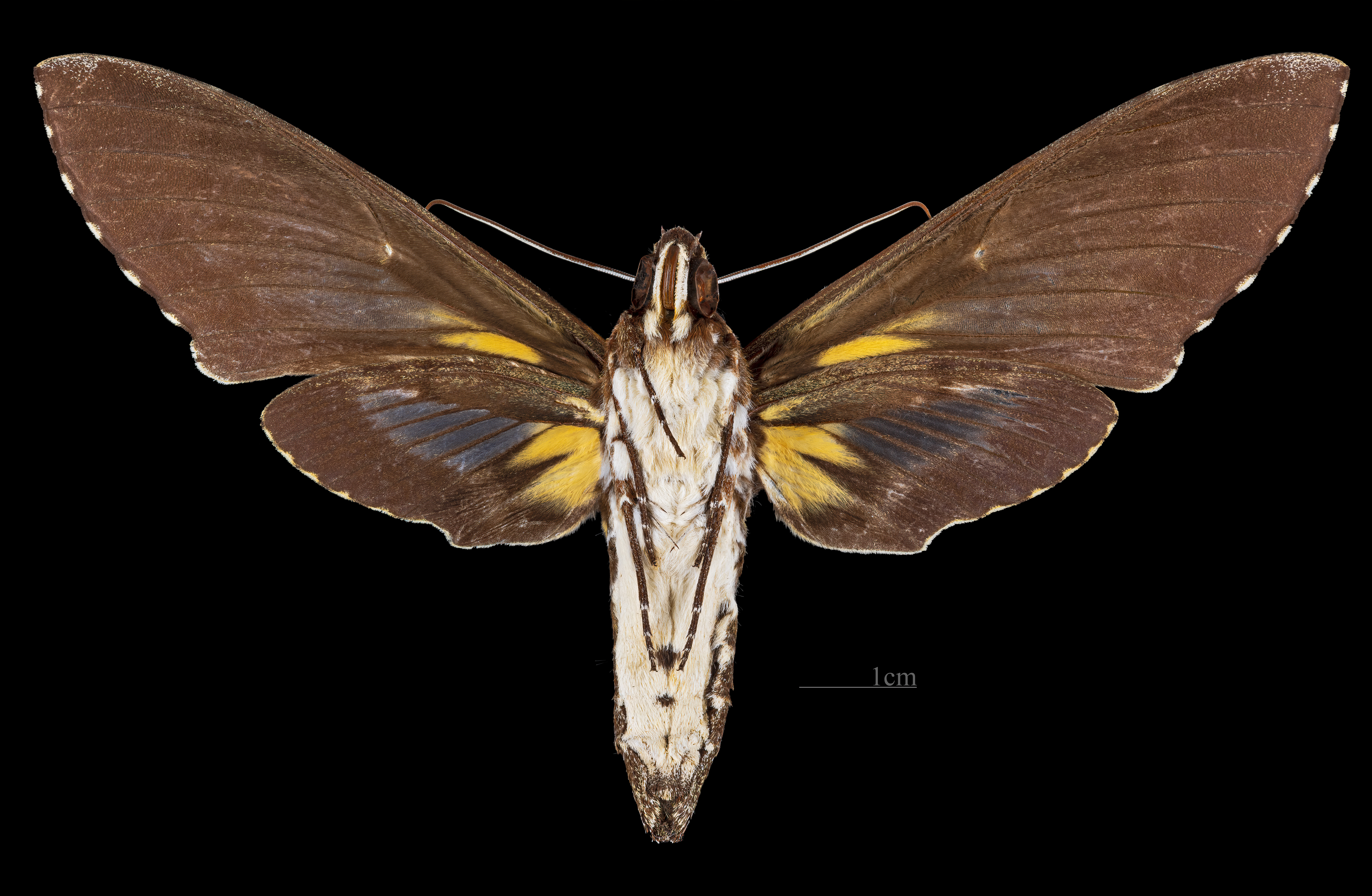
Female ventral side

== biology ==
Adults are on wing year round. They feed on nectar at flowers.

The larvae feed on Guatteria diospyroides, Annona purpurea, Annona reticulata, Xylopia frutescens and Annona glabra and probably other Annonaceae species. They are very colourful.
