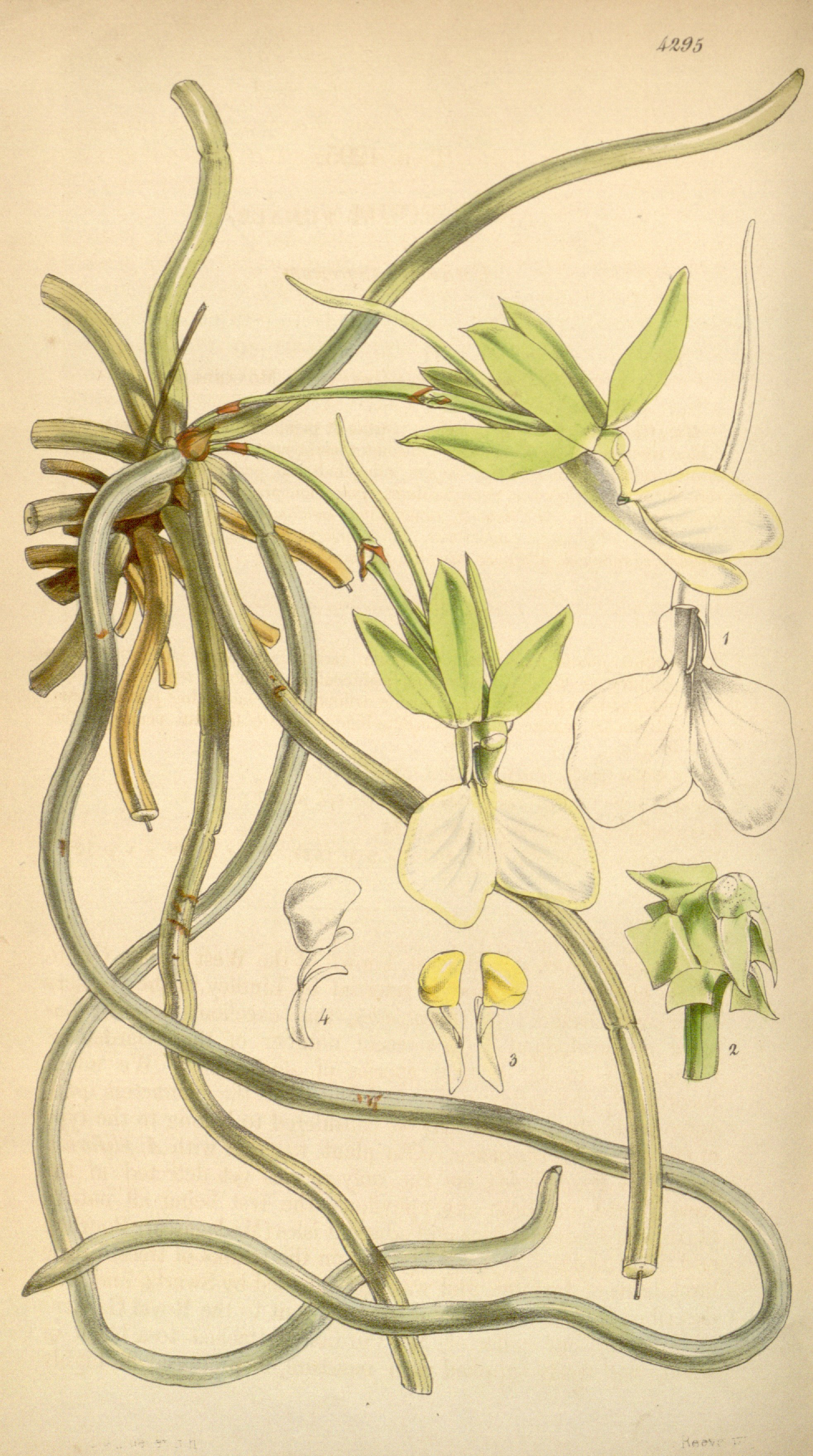
- Dendrophylax funalis, likely drawn by Walter Hood Fitch

Conservation status
- Near Threatened (IUCN 3.1)

Scientific classification
- Kingdom: Plantae
- Clade: Tracheophytes
- Clade: Angiosperms
- Clade: Monocots
- Order: Asparagales
- Family: Orchidaceae
- Subfamily: Epidendroideae
- Genus: Dendrophylax
- Species: D. funalis

Binomial name
- Dendrophylax funalis (Sw.) Benth. ex Rolfe

Synonyms
- Aeranthes funalis (Sw.) Rchb.f.; Angorkis funalis (Sw.) Kuntze; Angraecum funale (Sw.) Lindl.; Epidendrum funale Sw.; Limodorum funale (Sw.) Sw.; Oeceoclades funalis (Sw.) Lindl.; Polyrrhiza funalis (Sw.) Pfitzer; Trichocentrum funale (Sw.) Lindl.

= Dendrophylax funalis =

Species of orchid

Dendrophylax funalis, also known as the corded ghost orchid, is a species of orchid endemic to the island of Jamaica. It is a leafless epiphyte or lithophyte which flowers between September and April. It is native to Hanover, Manchester, St. Ann, St. Elizabeth, St. James, St. Mary, St. Thomas, Trelawny, and Westmoreland parishes, where it grows on trees or on limestone rocks in dry or moist limestone forest and woodland from 250 to 550 meters elevation.

Along with other species of genus Dendrophylax, D. funalis is threatened. The IUCN Red List assesses the species as Near Threatened.

== Description ==
This flower is very similar to a flower of the same genus, Dendrophylax lindenii, which shares the same common name. The two flowers have the same scent of jasmine and fresh apples; however, D. funalis has small lime green petals while D. lindenii has two twisted white petals that look similar to the hind legs of a jumping frog. D. funalis is easier to cultivate than D. lindenii.
