= Amphonyx jamaicensis =

Scientific classification
- Kingdom: Animalia
- Phylum: Arthropoda
- Class: Insecta
- Order: Lepidoptera
- Family: Sphingidae
- Genus: Amphonyx
- Species: A. jamaicensis

Binomial name
- Amphonyx jamaicensis Eitschberger, 2006

Synonyms
- Cocytius musgravei Cary, 1955

Species of moth

Amphonyx jamaicensis is a moth of the family Sphingidae. It is known from Jamaica.
