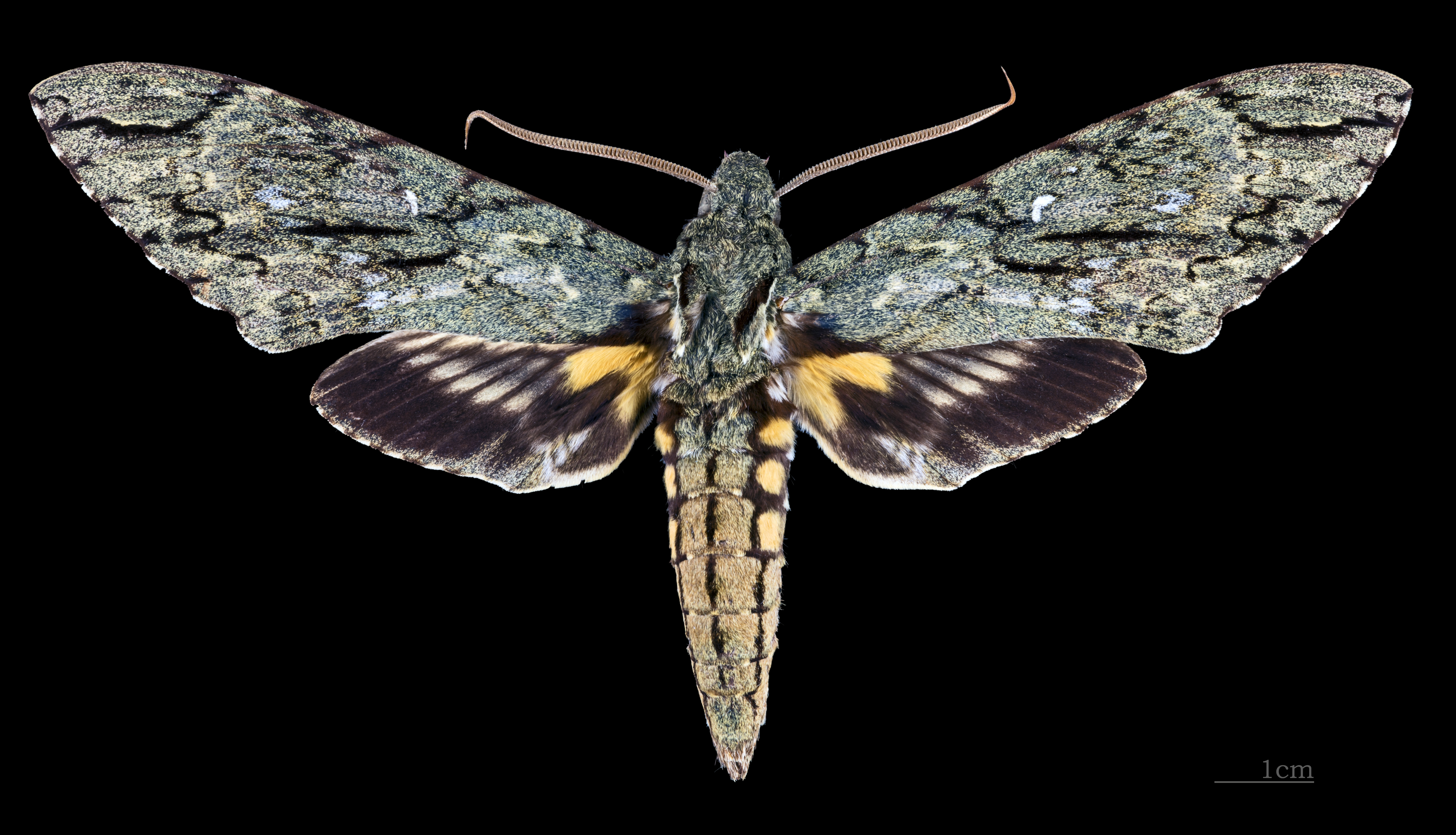
- Amphonyx lucifer

Scientific classification
- Domain: Eukaryota
- Kingdom: Animalia
- Phylum: Arthropoda
- Class: Insecta
- Order: Lepidoptera
- Family: Sphingidae
- Subfamily: Sphinginae
- Tribe: Sphingini
- Genus: Amphonyx; Poey, 1832

= Amphonyx =

Genus of moths

Amphonyx is a genus of hawkmoths in the family Sphingidae erected by Felipe Poey in 1832.

== Species ==
- Amphonyx duponchel Poey, 1832
- Amphonyx haxairei (Cadiou, 2006)
- Amphonyx jamaicensis Eitschberger, 2006
- Amphonyx kofleri Eitschberger, 2006
- Amphonyx lucifer (Rothschild & Jordan, 1903)
- Amphonyx mephisto (Haxaire & Vaglia, 2002)
- Amphonyx rivularis Butler, 1875
- Amphonyx vitrinus (Rothschild & Jordan 1910)
