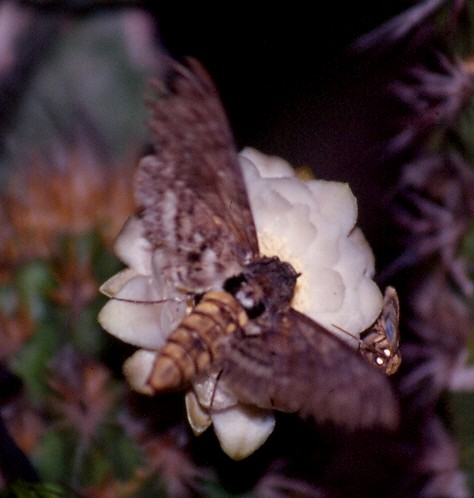

Scientific classification
- Domain: Eukaryota
- Kingdom: Animalia
- Phylum: Arthropoda
- Class: Insecta
- Order: Lepidoptera
- Family: Sphingidae
- Genus: Cocytius
- Species: C. antaeus

Binomial name
- Cocytius antaeus (Drury, 1773)

Synonyms
- Sphinx antaeus Drury, 1773; Sphinx annonae Shaw, 1802; Sphinx hydaspus Cramer, 1777; Sphinx iatrophae Fabricius, 1775; Sphinx medor Stoll, 1782; Amphonyx tapayusa Moore, 1883; Cocytius henrici Pinchon, 1969

= Cocytius antaeus =

Giant sphinx

Species of moth

Cocytius antaeus, the giant sphinx, is a moth of the family Sphingidae. The species was first described by Dru Drury in 1773.

== Distribution ==
It is found from Brazil through Central America and into the southern parts of California, Texas, and Florida in the United States.

== Description ==
The wingspan is 126–178 mm. Very rare in North America, it was once thought to be the only insect in the continent with a long enough proboscis to pollinate the ghost orchid.

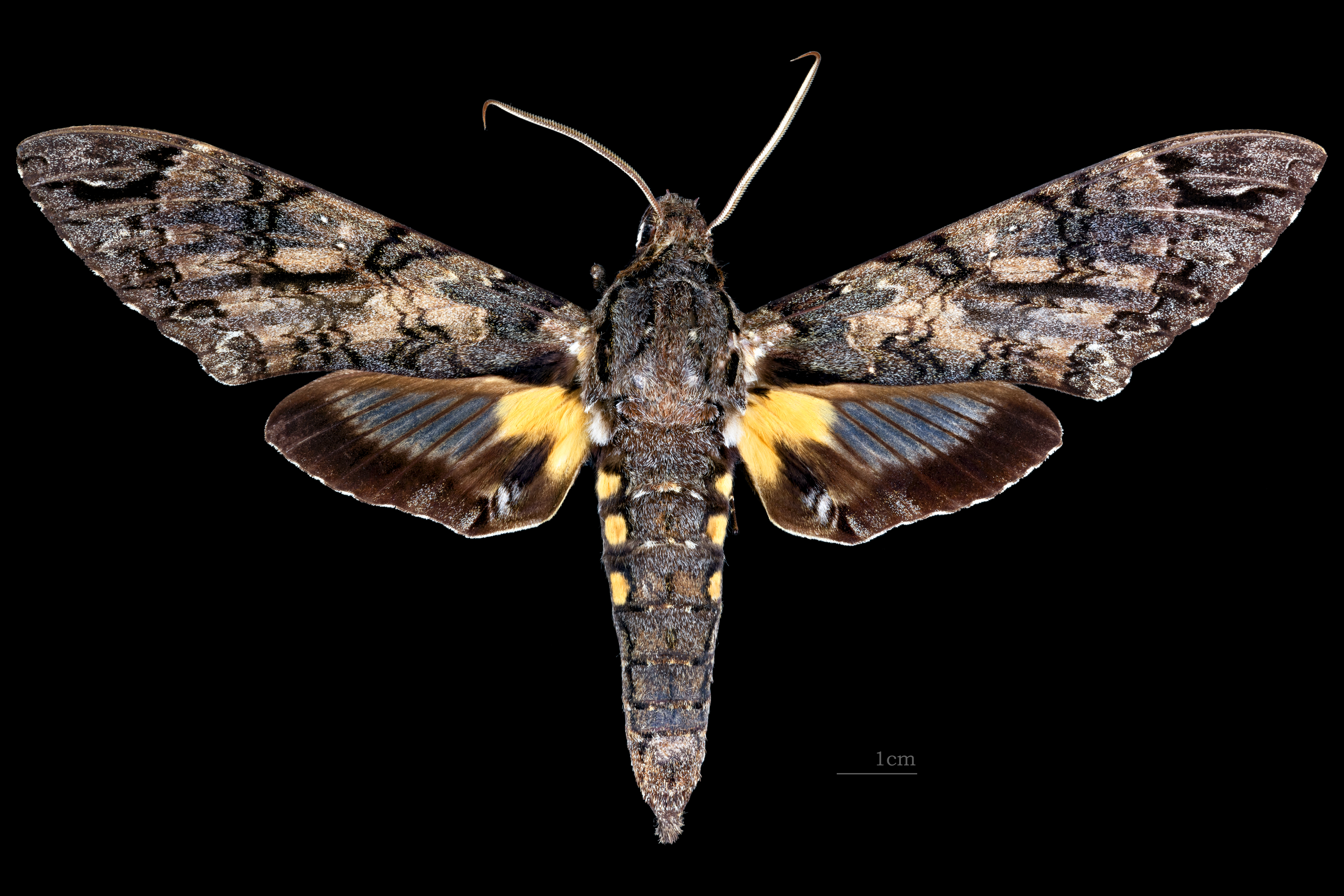
Male dorsal

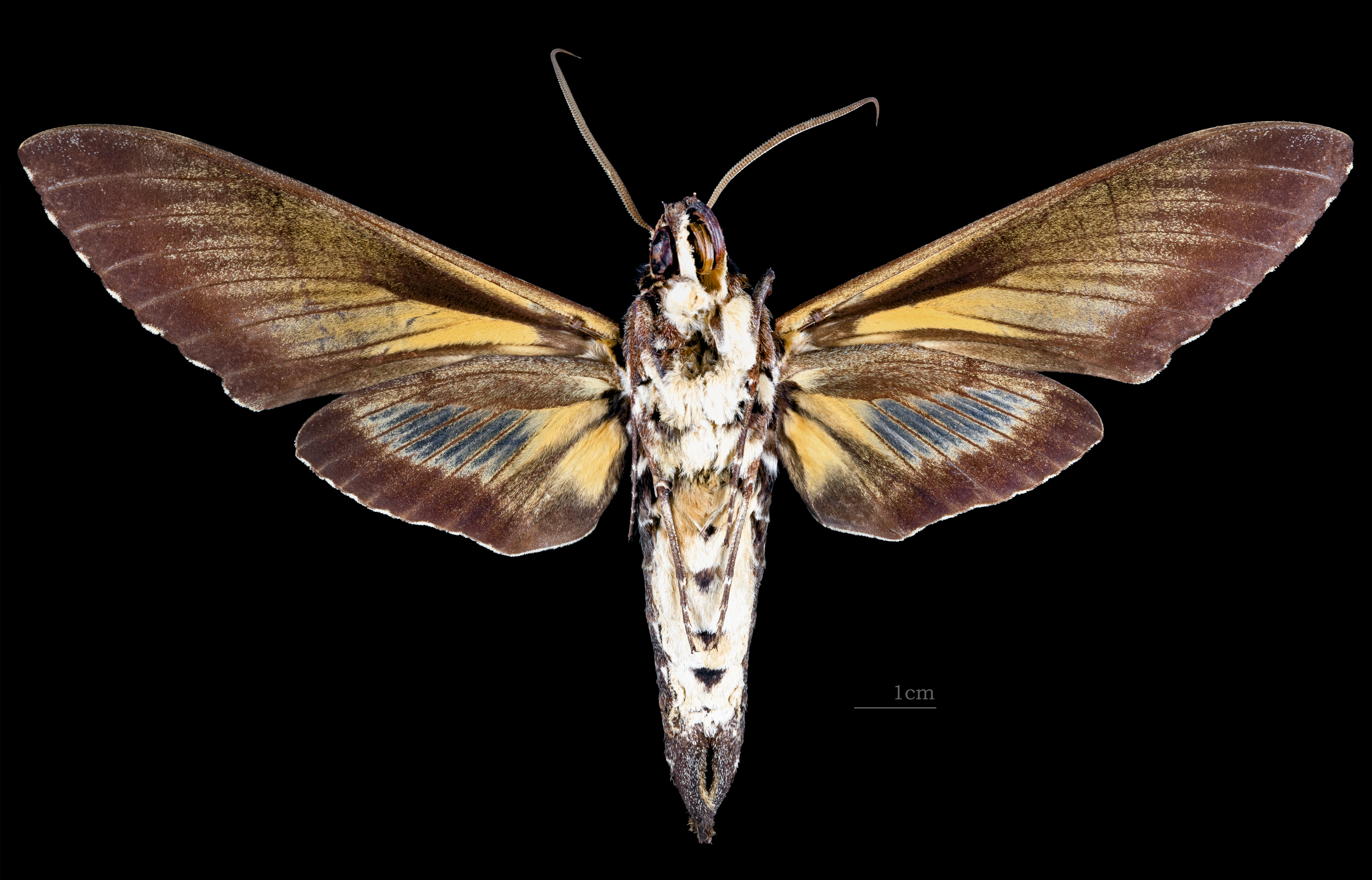
Male ventral

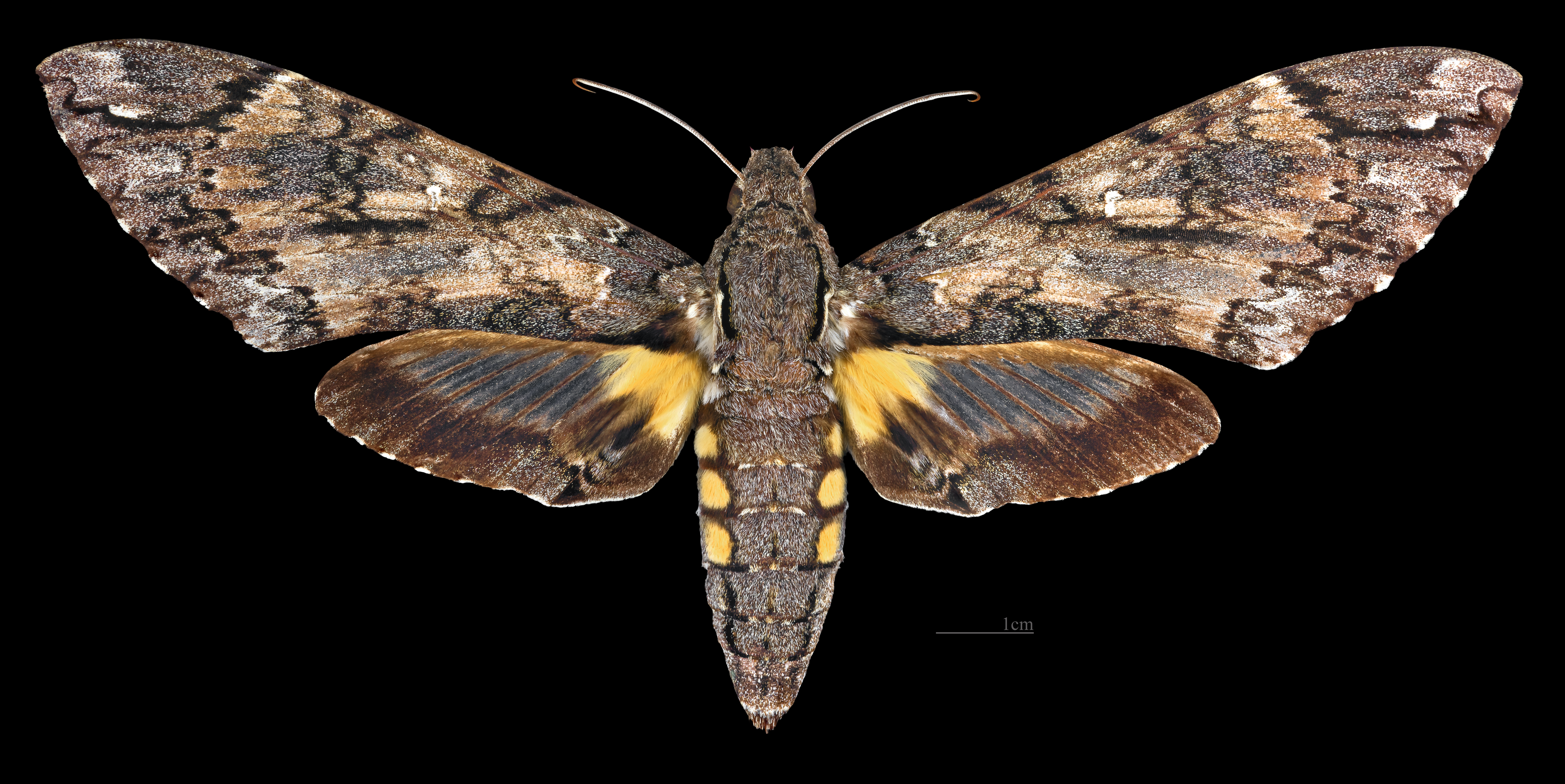
Female dorsal

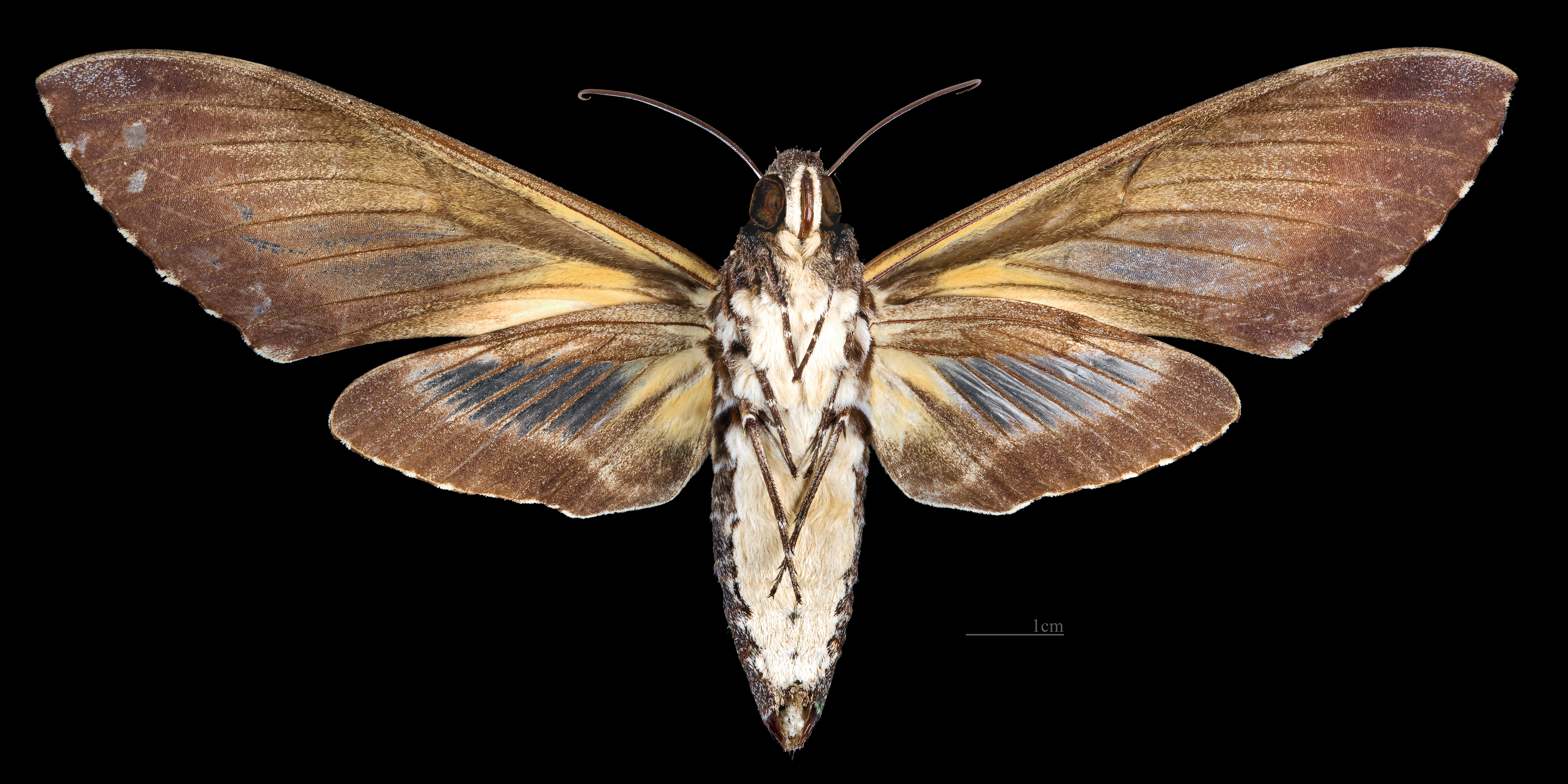
Female ventral

== Biology ==
The larvae feed on Annona glabra, Annona reticulata, Annona purpurea, Annona holosericea and Rollinia membranacea.
