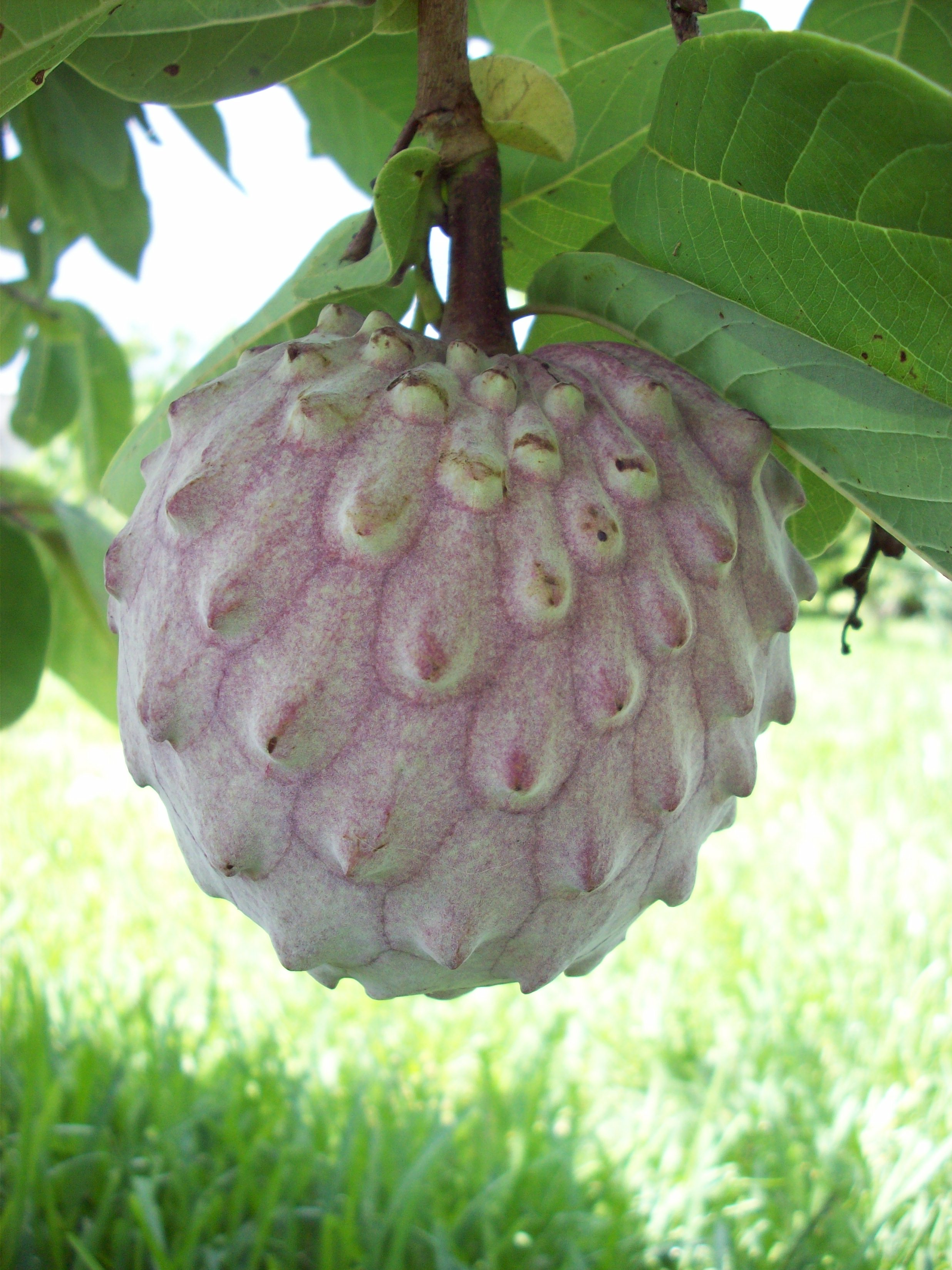
- Fruit

Conservation status
- Least Concern (IUCN 3.1)

Scientific classification
- Kingdom: Plantae
- Clade: Tracheophytes
- Clade: Angiosperms
- Clade: Magnoliids
- Order: Magnoliales
- Family: Annonaceae
- Genus: Annona
- Species: A. macroprophyllata

Binomial name
- Annona macroprophyllata Donn.Sm.

Synonyms
- Annona diversifolia Saff.

= Annona macroprophyllata =

Species of plant

Annona macroprophyllata is a species of plant in the family Annonaceae. It is native to El Salvador, Guatemala, Honduras, and central and southern Mexico. John Donnell Smith, the American botanist who first formally described the species, named it after its large leaves (Latinized forms of Greek μακρός, makrós and φύλλον, phúllon).

== Description ==
A bush reaching 3–4 meters in height. Its membranous, elliptical leaves are 4-6 by 2–3.5 centimeters and have rounded or slightly indented tips. The leaves are hairless on both surfaces. Its petioles are 2–3 millimeters long. Its solitary flowers are on 1–2.7 centimeter long pedicels. Its oval sepals are 3–4 millimeters long and covered in rust-colored shaggy hairs. Its outer petals are 20 by 5–7 millimeters and covered in fine hairs. The mature, thick, fleshy, outer petals have an outer surface that is green at the base and yellow at the tip, while its inner surface has pink and red highlights. Its inner petals are rudimentary. Its ovaries are hairless.

It is distinguished by its aromatic, pale-brownish-grey, furrowed bark and glossy, thin, elliptic to obovate or oblanceolate leaves, two to six inches (5.1 to 15.2 cm) long. Clasping the base of the flowering branchlets are one or two leaf-like, nearly circular, glabrous bracts, about 1 to 1 3/8 inches (2.5 to 3.5 cm) in length. New growth is tinged a reddish or coppery color. The solitary flowers have three minutely hairy, long and narrow petals, maroon in color, with small, rusty, hairy sepals, and stamen-like, pollen-bearing inner petals.

=== Reproductive biology ===
The pollen of A. macroprophyllata is shed as permanent tetrads.

=== Distribution and habitat ===
It has been observed growing at an elevation of 1,110 meters.

=== Cultivation ===
Fruit harvest of the ilama tree occurs in late June in Mexico, and only lasts about two weeks. In Guatemala, the harvest season extends from late July to September, and from July to December where the ilama is cultivated in Florida.

According to tradition, the fruits are not to be picked until cracking occurs, but they can be picked a little earlier and held up to three days for softening to take place. If the ilama is picked too early, it will never ripen. The yield of the ilama is typically low. During the normal fruiting period, some trees will have no fruits; others only three to 10, while exceptional trees may bear as many as 85 to 100 fruits per season.

=== Uses ===
Bioactive molecules extracted from the leaves have been reported to have alpha-glucosidase inhibitor activity.

== Fruit ==
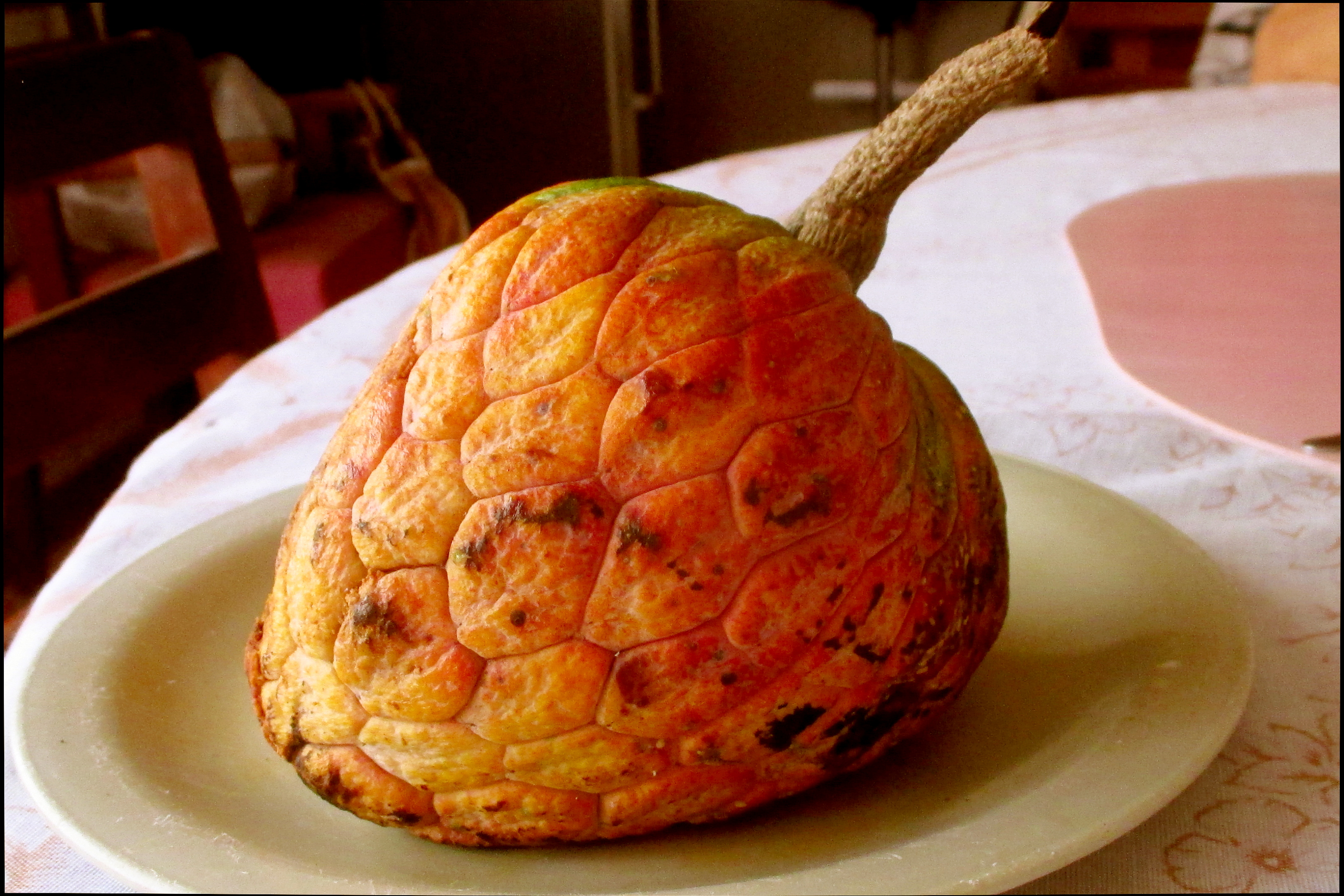

The ilama is a compound fruit, which is either cone-shaped, heart-shaped, or ovular. Resembling the cherimoya, it is about six inches (15 cm) long and may weigh as much as two pounds (910 g). Generally, the ilama is covered with more-or-less pronounced, triangular lobules, though some fruits on the same tree may vary from bumpy to fairly smooth. The ilama is sometimes termed the cherimoya of the lowlands. The name is derived from the Nahuatl ilamatzapotl, of which the rough translation is "old woman's sapote". The name is also applied to a similar fruit, soncoya or cabeza de negro (Annona purpurea).

There are two types of ilama, green and pink. The green type has a flesh that is white and sweet, while the pink type has rosy-colored flesh with a tart taste.

The rind, or skin, of the ilama varies from a pale-green color to a deep-pink or purplish color, coated with a thick layer of velvety, gray-white bloom. It is about 1/4 inch thick (6 mm), leathery, fairly soft, with a grainy surface. The flesh towards the fruit's center is somewhat fibrous, but smooth and custardy near the rind. The flesh varies from being dryish to being fairly juicy, and contains 25 to 80 hard, smooth, brown, cylindrical seeds, about 3/4 inch (1.9 cm) long, and 3/8 inch (0.95 cm) wide. Each seed is enclosed in a close-fitting membrane that, when split, allows the seed to slip out

The ilama fruit is eaten halved, by scooping the flesh out of the rind, and usually chilled when served. It is sometimes served with cream and sugar to intensify the flavor, or with a drop of lime or lemon juice to highlight a tart and bitter note.

=== Nutrition ===
According to analyses made in El Salvador, the food value per 100 g of edible portion of the fruit is as follows:

- Moisture, 71.5 g
- Protein, 0.447 g
- Fat, 0.16 g
- Fiber, 1.3 g
- Ash, 1.37 g
- Calcium, 31.6 mg
- Phosphorus, 51.7 mg
- Iron, 0.70 mg
- Carotene, 0.011 mg
- Thiamine, 0.235 mg
- Riboflavin, 0.297 mg
- Niacin, 2.177 mg
- Ascorbic Acid, 13.6 mg

== History ==
Francisco Hernandez was one of the first people to document the ilama. He was sent by King Philip II of Spain in 1570 to take note of the useful products of Mexico. For many years, people confused it with the soursop or the custard apple.

The ilama is native and grows wild in the foothills of the southwest coast of Mexico and of the Pacific coast of Guatemala and El Salvador. It is strictly a tropical plant. It does not grow naturally higher than 2,000 feet (610 m) in Mexico; although in El Salvador it is cultivated at 5,000 feet (1,500 m), and in Guatemala, it is cultivated up to 5,900 feet (1,800 m). The ilama survives best in climates where there is a long dry season followed by plentiful rainfall. The tree is irrigated in areas where rainfall does not fall periodically.
