= Dendrophylax filiformis =

Scientific classification
- Kingdom: Plantae
- Clade: Tracheophytes
- Clade: Angiosperms
- Clade: Monocots
- Order: Asparagales
- Family: Orchidaceae
- Subfamily: Epidendroideae
- Genus: Dendrophylax
- Species: D. filiformis

Binomial name
- Dendrophylax filiformis (Sw.) Benth. ex Fawc.

Synonyms
- Epidendrum filiforme Sw.; Limodorum filiforme (Sw.) Sw.; Angraecum filiforme (Sw.) Lindl.; Aeranthes filiformis (Sw.) Griseb.; Campylocentrum filiforme (Sw.) Cogn. ex Kuntze; Harrisella filiformis (Sw.) Cogn. in I.Urban; Aeranthes monteverdi Rchb.f.; Campylocentrum monteverdi (Rchb.f.) Rolfe; Harrisella monteverdi (Rchb.f.) Cogn. in I.Urban; Dendrophylax monteverdi (Rchb.f.) Ackerman & Nir

Species of orchid

Dendrophylax filiformis is a species of orchid native to Cuba, Hispaniola, Jamaica and Puerto Rico.
