= Amphonyx kofleri =

Scientific classification
- Kingdom: Animalia
- Phylum: Arthropoda
- Class: Insecta
- Order: Lepidoptera
- Family: Sphingidae
- Genus: Amphonyx
- Species: A. kofleri

Binomial name
- Amphonyx kofleri Eitschberger, 2006

Species of moth

Amphonyx kofleri is a moth of the family Sphingidae. It is found in the Dominican Republic.
