= Dendrophylax porrectus =

Scientific classification
- Kingdom: Plantae
- Clade: Tracheophytes
- Clade: Angiosperms
- Clade: Monocots
- Order: Asparagales
- Family: Orchidaceae
- Subfamily: Epidendroideae
- Genus: Dendrophylax
- Species: D. porrectus

Binomial name
- Dendrophylax porrectus (Rchb.f.) Carlsward & Whitten

Synonyms
- Aeranthes porrecta Rchb.f.; Campylocentrum porrectum (Rchb.f.) Rolfe; Harrisella porrecta (Rchb.f.) Fawc. & Rendle; Harrisella amesiana Cogn. in I.Urban; Harrisella uniflora H.Dietr.

Species of orchid

Dendrophylax porrectus, the jingle bell orchid, or needleroot orchid, is a species of epiphytic orchid native to Mexico, El Salvador, Guatemala, Florida, Cayman Islands, Cuba, Hispaniola, Jamaica, and Puerto Rico.

Dendrophylax porrectus has been referred to by many authors by the synonym Harrisella porrecta, including in the Flora of North America.
