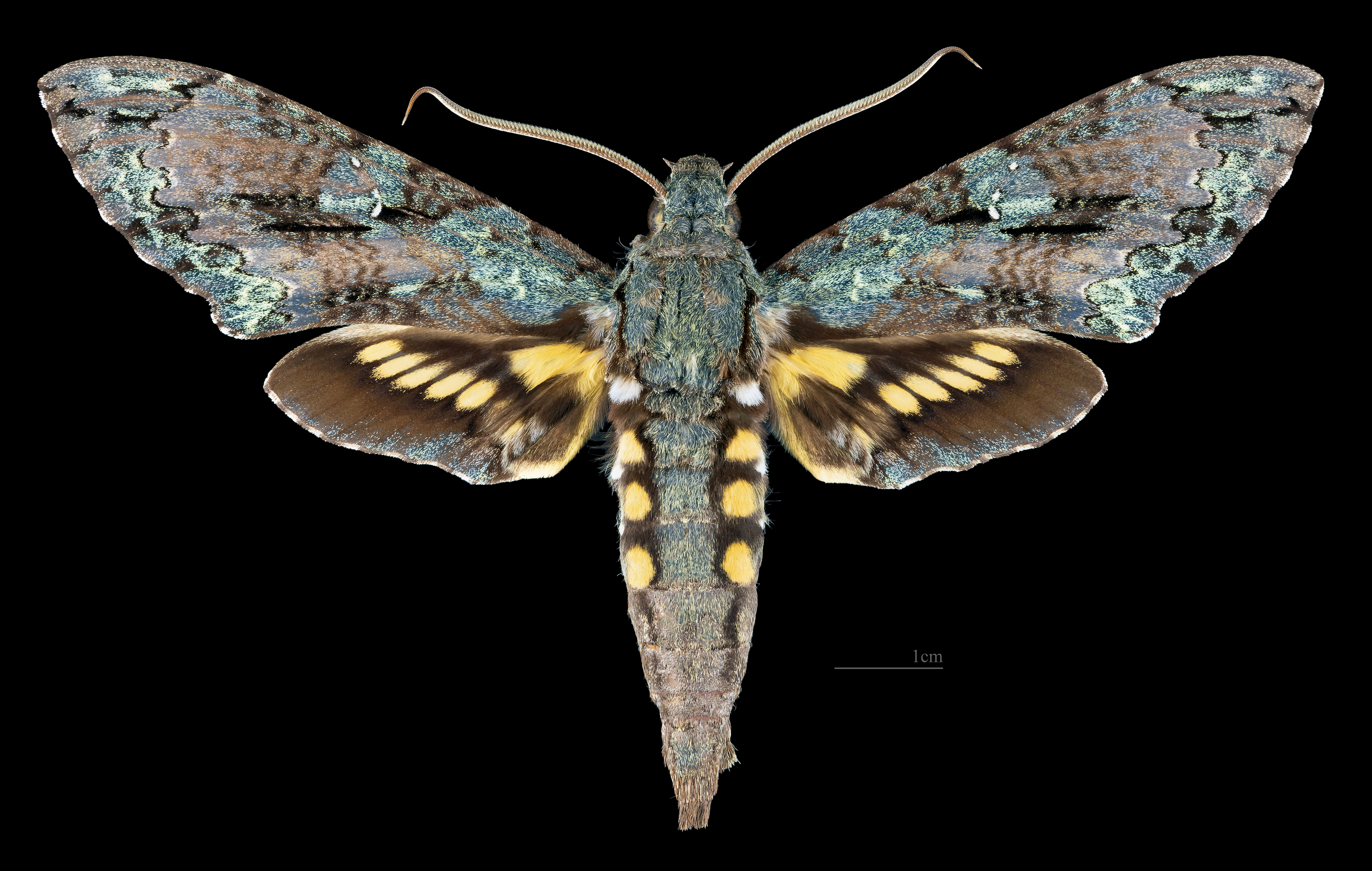
- Pseudococytius beelzebuth Male dorsal
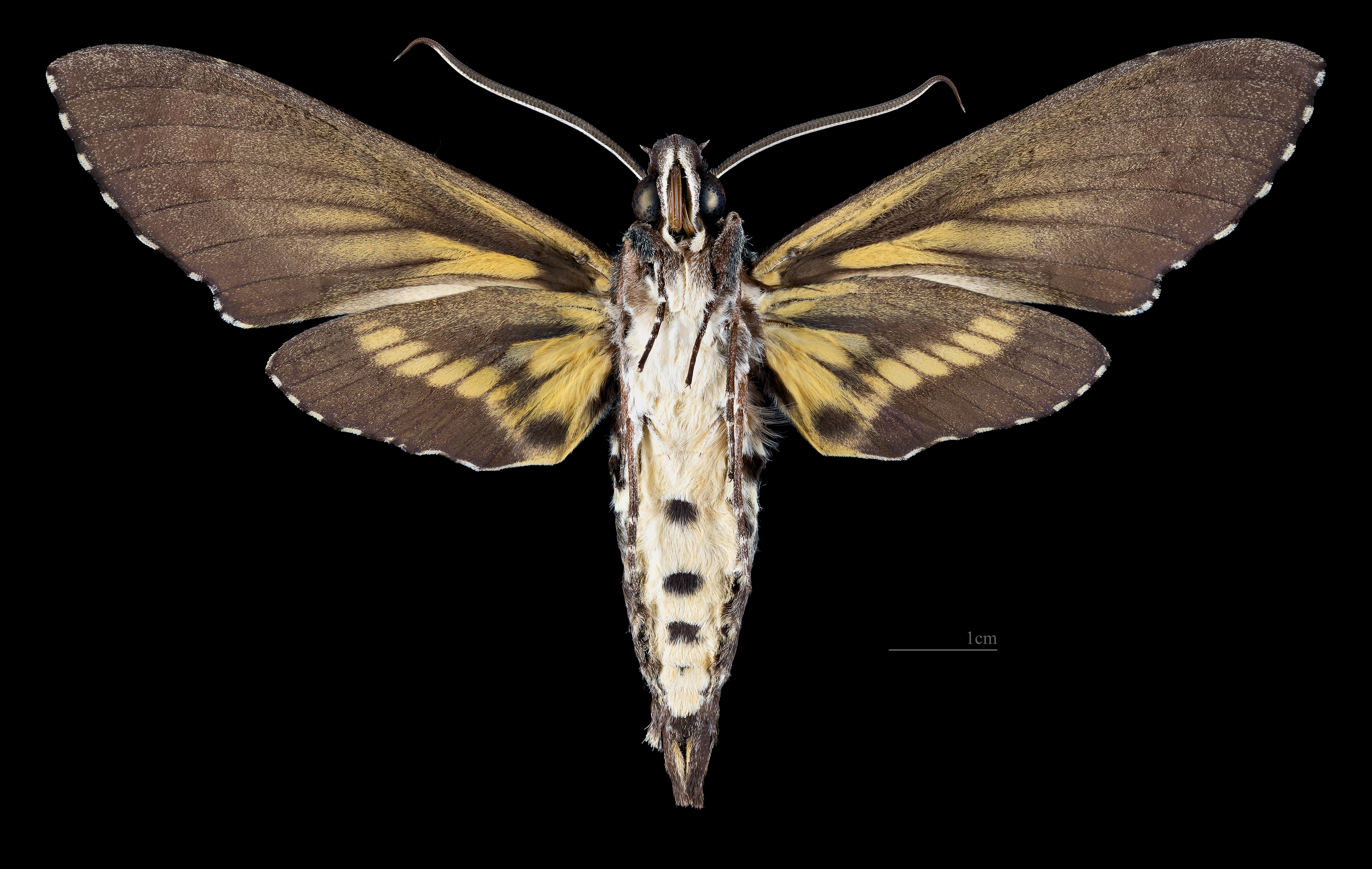
- Pseudococytius beelzebuth Male ventral

Scientific classification
- Kingdom: Animalia
- Phylum: Arthropoda
- Class: Insecta
- Order: Lepidoptera
- Family: Sphingidae
- Genus: Pseudococytius; Eitschberger, 2006
- Species: P. beelzebuth

Binomial name
- Pseudococytius beelzebuth (Boisduval, 1875)

Synonyms
- Amphonyx beelzebuth Boisduval, 1875; Cocytius beelzebuth

= Pseudococytius =

Genus of moths

Pseudococytius is a genus of hawkmoths. The single species, Pseudococytius beelzebuth was placed in Cocytius for a long time.

== Distribution ==
It is found from Nicaragua and Costa Rica south through Venezuela to Brazil, Bolivia and Venezuela.

== Description ==
The wingspan is 115–148 mm.

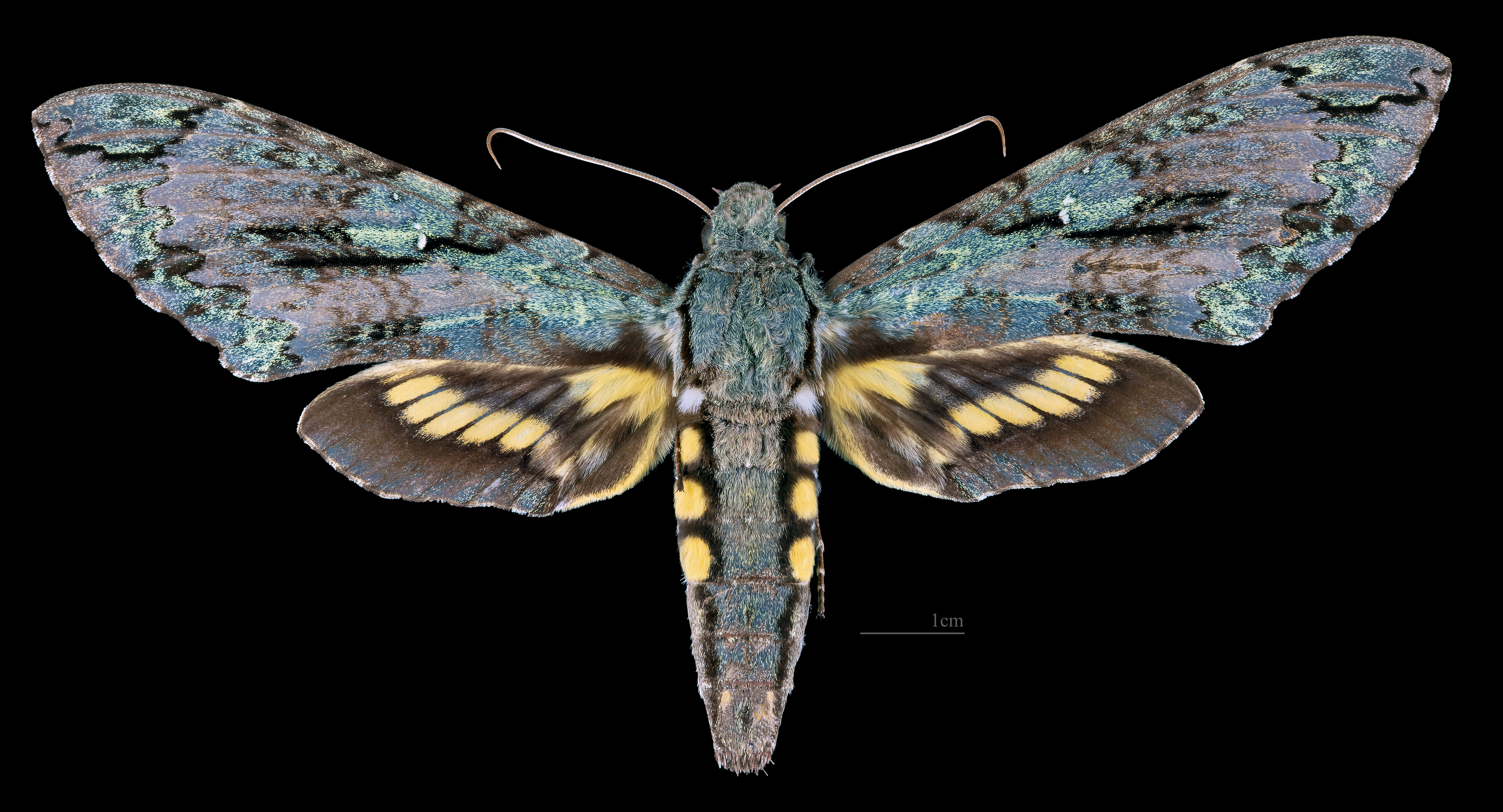
Female dorsal

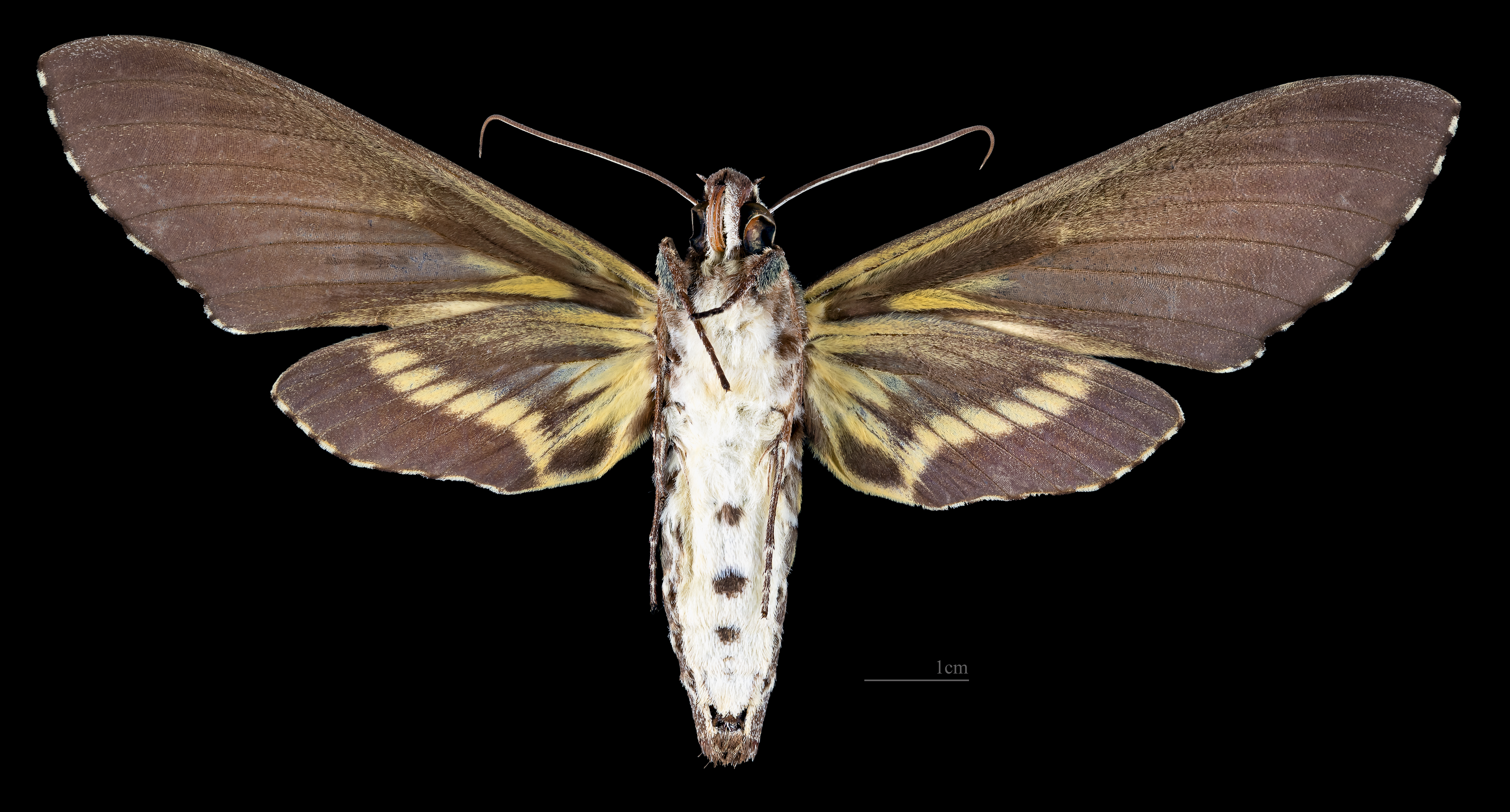
Female ventral

== Biology ==
There are at least two generations per year in Costa Rica with adults on wing from January to February and again from July to August.

The larvae feed on Guatteria diospyroides.
