= Amphonyx mephisto =

Scientific classification
- Domain: Eukaryota
- Kingdom: Animalia
- Phylum: Arthropoda
- Class: Insecta
- Order: Lepidoptera
- Family: Sphingidae
- Genus: Amphonyx
- Species: A. mephisto

Binomial name
- Amphonyx mephisto (Haxaire & Vaglia, 2002)

Synonyms
- Cocytius mephisto Haxaire & Vaglia, 2002

Species of moth

Amphonyx mephisto is a moth of the family Sphingidae. It is found from southern Brazil to Paraguay and Argentina.
