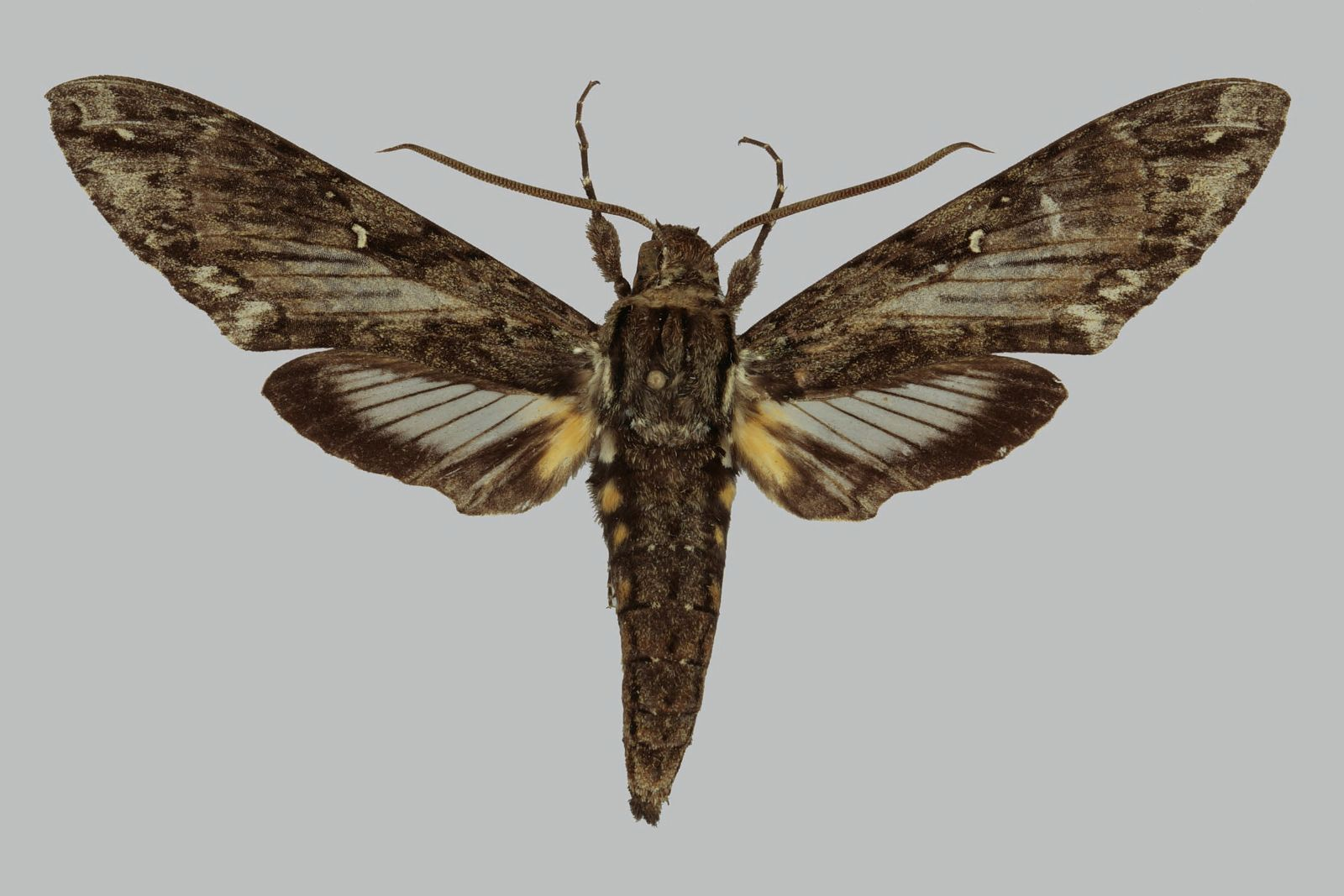

Scientific classification
- Domain: Eukaryota
- Kingdom: Animalia
- Phylum: Arthropoda
- Class: Insecta
- Order: Lepidoptera
- Family: Sphingidae
- Genus: Amphonyx
- Species: A. vitrinus

Binomial name
- Amphonyx vitrinus (Rothschild & Jordan, 1910)

Synonyms
- Cocytius vitrinus Rothschild & Jordan, 1910

= Amphonyx vitrinus =

Species of moth

Amphonyx vitrinus is a moth of the family Sphingidae. It is known from Cuba and Hispaniola.

Adults are probably on wing year round. They nectar at flowers.

The larvae probably feed on Annonaceae species.
