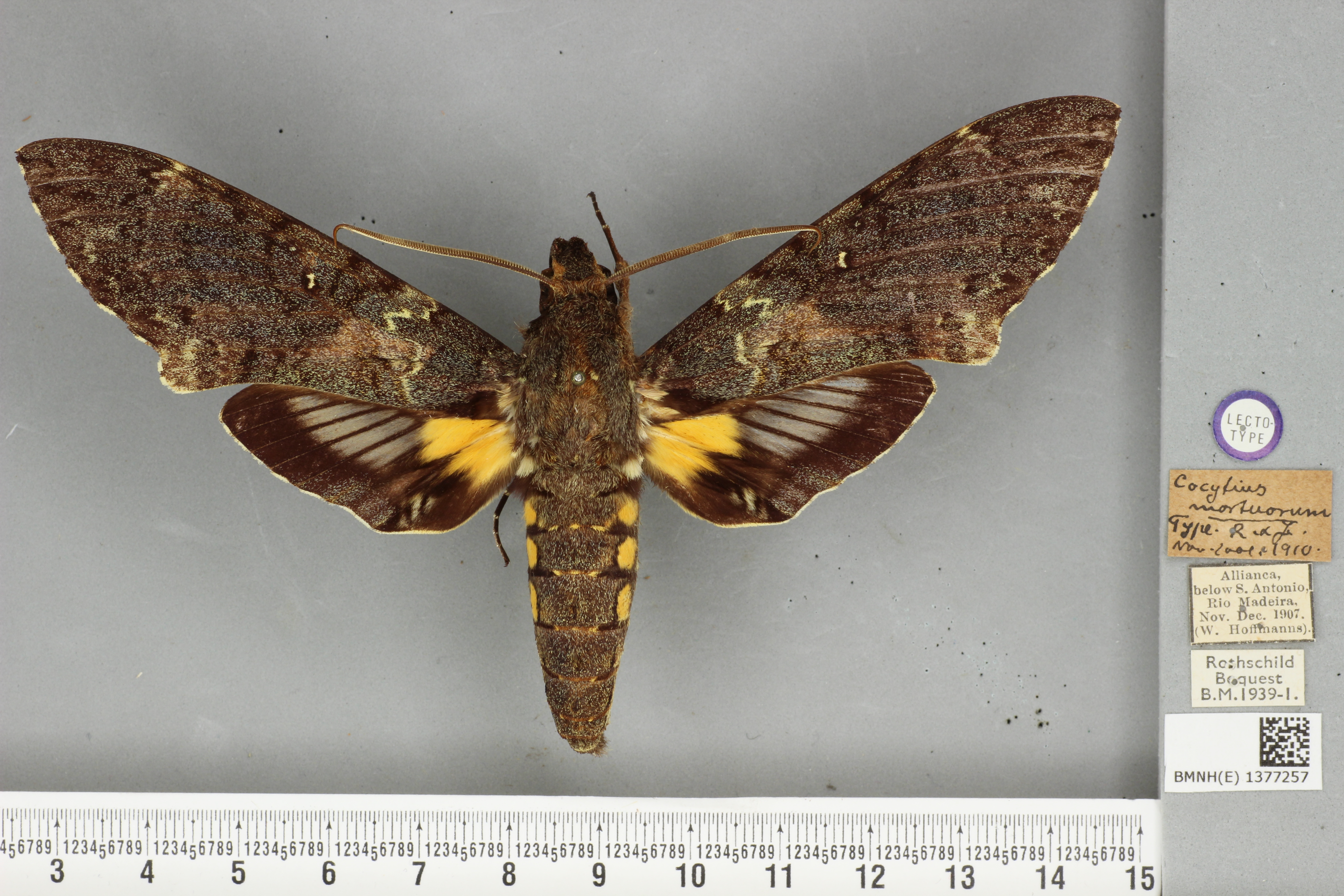

Scientific classification
- Kingdom: Animalia
- Phylum: Arthropoda
- Class: Insecta
- Order: Lepidoptera
- Family: Sphingidae
- Tribe: Sphingini
- Genus: Morcocytius; Eitschberger, 2006
- Species: M. mortuorum

Binomial name
- Morcocytius mortuorum (Rothschild & Jordan, 1910)

Synonyms
- Cocytius mortuorum Rothschild & Jordan, 1910

= Morcocytius =

Genus of moths

Morcocytius is a genus of hawkmoths containing only one species, Morcocytius mortuorum. Other sources do not recognize Morcocytius and keep this species in its original genus, Cocytius, as Cocytius mortuorum.

Morcocytius is known from Panama south to central South America, with records from Colombia, French Guiana, Brazil, Ecuador, Peru and Bolivia.

The wingspan is about 130–140 mm. The adults feed on the nectar of various flowers. The larvae feed on a range of Annonaceae.
