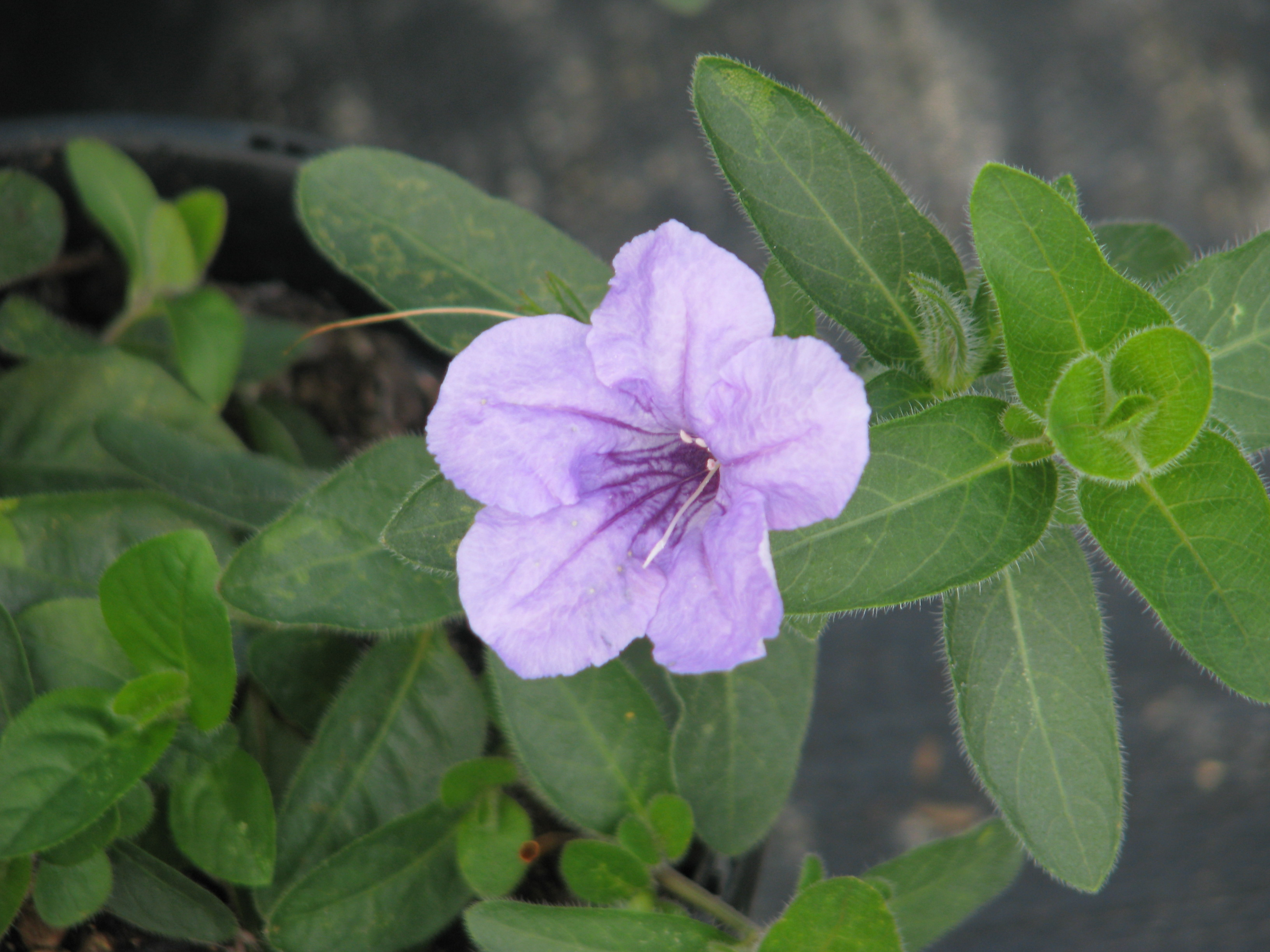

Conservation status
- Secure (NatureServe)

Scientific classification
- Kingdom: Plantae
- Clade: Tracheophytes
- Clade: Angiosperms
- Clade: Eudicots
- Clade: Asterids
- Order: Lamiales
- Family: Acanthaceae
- Genus: Ruellia
- Species: R. humilis

Binomial name
- Ruellia humilis Nutt.

Synonyms
- Ruellia ciliosa var. longiflora

= Ruellia humilis =

Species of flowering plant

Ruellia humilis (wild petunia, fringeleaf wild petunia, hairy petunia, low wild petunia) is a species of flowering plant in the family Acanthaceae. It is native to the eastern United States. It is grown as an ornamental plant.

Ruellia humilis is native to the U.S. from the northeastern/northern central to the southeastern/southern central regions. According to the Germplasm Resources Information Network of the United States Department of Agriculture, Ruellia humilis is native to the following states:

Alabama, Arkansas, Georgia, Illinois, Indiana, Iowa, (eastern) Kansas, Kentucky, Louisiana, Maryland, Michigan, (southeastern) Minnesota, Mississippi, Missouri, Nebraska, (western) North Carolina, Ohio, Oklahoma, Pennsylvania, Tennessee, (eastern) Texas, West Virginia, Wisconsin, and Virginia.

It is not well-known or used much in conventional nurseries or gardens, but use in gardens has been increasing as native plants become more popular. It is usually about one foot high, but can get to two feet high. Its leaves are oppositely arranged, around 2.5 inches long by 1 inch wide, and are light green to medium green with entire margins. The stems and leaves are covered with soft white hairs. The funnel-shaped 5-lobed flowers are about 1.5 to 2.5 inches in diameter and resemble petunias, as does the rest of the plant. The lavender flowers bloom in July into September and open in the morning and fall off in the evening.

== Ecology ==
Ruellia humilis grows in dry to average soil in full sun to part shade conditions. Its habitats include prairies, glades, meadows, and open woodland environments. It grows well in dry, shallow, and rocky soils. It has been observed to have a high level of richness of arbuscular mycorrhizal fungi(AMF) diversity when located in calcareous plots as compared to acidic plots.

With the general exclusive presence of Ruellia humilis in the United States set, there is more data that indicates, more specifically, the type of biome and regions that this plant shows up in more often. One case study sampling from Buettner Xeric Limestone Prairies, Illinois, Monroe County revealed that when comparing frequency of the plant, the plant had 70% presence in the eastern region of prairie and only 3% in the western region prairie. To place this data in perspective, the eastern region's vegetation covered about 38% of the surface while the western region's vegetation covered about 33.5% of its surface. Both regions' "rock was between 17% and 19%, and bare ground and litter was from 40% to 44%."

=== As host plant ===
This plant is a host plant for the common buckeye butterfly.
