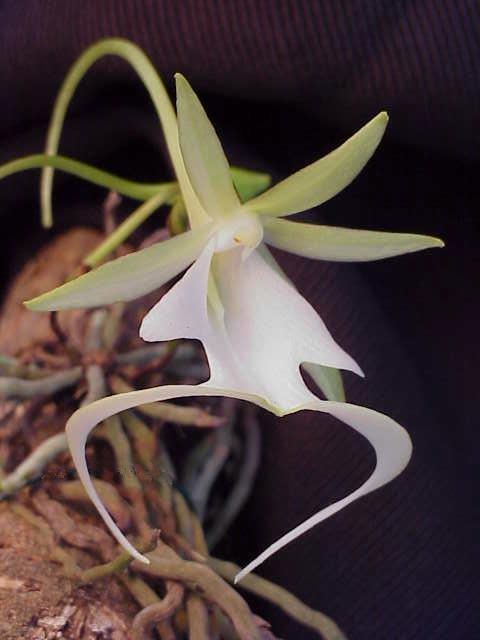

Conservation status
- Critically Imperiled (NatureServe)

Scientific classification
- Kingdom: Plantae
- Clade: Tracheophytes
- Clade: Angiosperms
- Clade: Monocots
- Order: Asparagales
- Family: Orchidaceae
- Subfamily: Epidendroideae
- Genus: Dendrophylax
- Species: D. lindenii

Binomial name
- Dendrophylax lindenii (Lindl.) Benth. ex Rolfe

Synonyms
- Aeranthes lindenii (Lindl.) Rchb.f. in W.G.Walpers; Angraecum lindenii Lindl.; Polyrrhiza lindenii (Lindl.) Cogn.; Polyradicion lindenii (Lindl.) Garay

= Dendrophylax lindenii =

Ghost orchid

Species of orchid

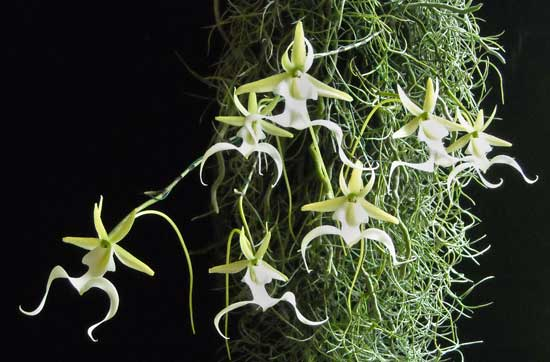
Dendrophylax lindenii

Dendrophylax lindenii, the ghost orchid (a common name also used for Epipogium aphyllum), is a rare perennial epiphyte from the orchid family (Orchidaceae). It is native to Florida and Cuba. Other common names include palm polly and white frog orchid.

== Name ==
The specific epithet "lindenii" is derived from its discoverer, the Belgian plant collector Jean Jules Linden, who saw this orchid for the first time in Cuba in 1844. Much later, it was also discovered in the Everglades in Florida.

== Biology ==
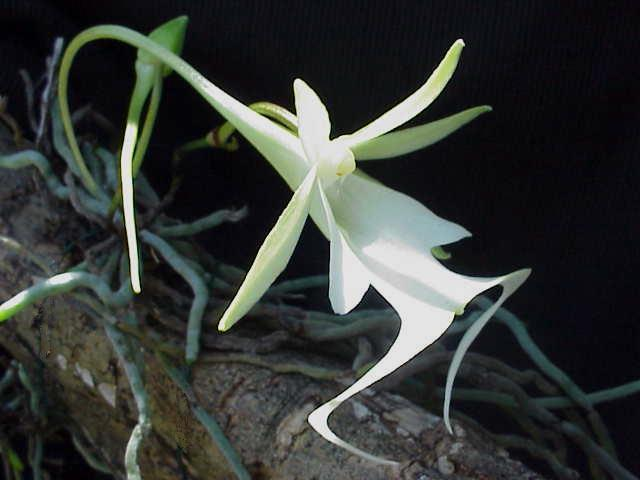
Dendrophylax lindenii

Dendrophylax lindenii is a leafless epiphyte in the tribe Vandeae, in the subfamily Epidendroideae. The plant consists mainly of a network of photosynthetic roots on a tree trunk. Its habitat is moist, swampy forest in south-western Florida, and Caribbean islands such as Cuba.

This orchid is exceptional among the monocots in that it consists of a greatly reduced stem, and its leaves have been reduced to scales. The flat, cord-like green roots constitute the bulk of the mature plant. They bear distinctive white "track marks", for which the technical term is pneumatodes, which are believed to function partly like stomata, enabling the photosynthetic roots to perform the gas exchange necessary for respiration and photosynthesis. Chloroplasts in these flattened roots perform nearly all the plant's photosynthesis. Their outer layer is an example of the velamen typical of most epiphytic orchids. Its functions include the absorption of nutrients and water, and admission of light for photosynthesis.

The species is endangered in the wild, and cultivation has proven exceptionally difficult, but while most attempts to raise seedlings into adult plants in sterile culture end in failure, some orchidists have in fact succeeded. This orchid is listed in Appendix II of CITES and is fully protected by Florida state laws, which forbid its removal from the wild. Plants collected from the wild typically do not survive removal from their habitat, and die within a year. In the wild, Dendrophylax lindenii typically grows on the central trunk or large main branches of living trees. It seems to prefer Annona glabra (pond-apple) trees, or occasionally Fraxinus caroliniana (pop ash) trees. It tends to attach to a tree at about eye-level or a few feet higher.

Dendrophylax lindenii has been noted to form a symbiotic relationship with the fungus Thelophoraceae in order to gain nutrients and in turn provide sugars to the fungus. Due to the rare nature of these fungi, the ghost orchid cannot thrive in many ecosystems and is therefore considered rare.

Dendrophylax lindenii blossoms between June and August, producing one to ten fragrant flowers that open one at a time. The flowers are white, 3–4 cm (1.2–1.6 in) wide and 7–9 cm (2.8–3.5 in) long. They are borne on spikes arising from the root network. Their most intense fragrance is in the early morning, the scent fruity, resembling an apple. The lower petal, the labellum, has two long, lateral tendrils that twist slightly downward, resembling the hind legs of a jumping frog. Its bracts are scarious—thin and papery. The roots of this orchid are so well camouflaged on the tree that the flower may seem to float in mid-air, hence its name of "ghost orchid".

== Origin and affinities ==
The genus Dendrophylax is a distant relative of the African and Indian Ocean genus Angraecum; at the time of the origin of the family Orchidaceae, the Atlantic Ocean was still in parts a strait, permitting their common ancestors to establish in now widely separated Gondwanan regions.

== Pollination ==
The fig sphinx moth, Pachylia ficus, was the first insect to be scientifically described pollinating Dendrophylax lindenii, upending long-standing hypotheses about the giant sphinx moth, Cocytius antaeus, as the only possible pollinator. New research suggests that based on this finding, nearly a dozen species of hawkmoths (Lepidoptera: Sphingidae) could also serve as potential pollinators in Florida, with even more present in Cuba.

== Cultivation ==
Plants can be successfully grown in a terrarium-like environment, mounted bare-root on a decay-resistant, untreated wooden stock with the wood laid horizontally on top of a bed of living sphagnum moss, as the plants require high humidity and stagnant air, or, in a Wardian case or greenhouse which approximates these conditions. They have also been noted thriving with hickory wood over a century old. Plants should not be allowed to pollinate and set seed unless the plant is very large, at least 250 mm (10 in) across, as plants without sufficient biomass will transfer all of their stored reserves into making a very large seed pod, and then behave much like an annual and die after seed set. These plants should be given 1/4-strength fertilizer in distilled or other low-salt water sources weekly.

The plants are intolerant of water with high levels of dissolved salts; this will result in the roots dying off from the tips. Continued exposure to chlorinated tap water will usually kill these plants, with the tips of the roots yellowing and rapidly dying back to the reduced stem. It is normal for the plants to periodically consume and dehisce older roots, but this process does not yellow the roots, they simply shrivel and turn gray, then dehisce completely. Healthy plants will exhibit vigorous lime green root tips which are in an active state of growth. The plant's root tips will grow continuously, provided they receive bright light and regular fertilization and watering, with only a short resting period in late fall/early winter. Water should never be allowed to remain standing in the roots nor should any portion of the plant's roots be immersed in standing water for any significant period of time. The key to getting these plants to grow quickly is to keep the roots moist continuously when they are small, without water standing in the roots, and regular fertilization. When the plants are small and their roots become dry, these plants cease to grow appreciably. They like to be kept moist, but not wet, to stimulate increase in biomass and active root growth when small. The roots of these plants will also tend to produce new plantlets in a starfish-like manner from broken or damaged roots or from roots which have grown longer than 300 mm (12 in), a growth habit shared with other members of the genus Dendrophylax.

Although plants in habitat occasionally experience light frost with some root tip damage, as a rule, the plants should never be subjected to freezing temperatures. Freezing temperatures, except for very short periods, will kill these plants in cultivation. Blooming is triggered by subjecting the plants to a cool, dry resting period, with only very light misting every few weeks, and lowering the humidity in the growing environment for a period of several months in late fall and early winter, when the plants are large enough to support flowering, typically with a root mass of 180–200 mm (7–8 in) across.

Newly forming flowers will appear from the highly reduced stem in the center of the root mass, and are difficult to distinguish from aerial roots until the flower starts to develop. When new growth is apparent after giving the plants a resting period, resume normal watering. Plants which are large and have set seed pods should be given more frequent fertilizing and should be limited to only a single seed pod per plant by removing all but one immature seed pod. When attempting to produce seed pods from one of these plants, if the plant has multiple flowers, all of them should be hand pollinated with pollinia from a different plant, if available, and only one seed pod allowed to remain on each plant, since not all of the flowers may be successfully pollinated. When mature, the pod contains thousands of microscopic, dust-like seeds.

In habitat, successful pollination of this species appears to be an infrequent, but not rare, event. The plants also flower irregularly in habitat, and some years do not flower at all.

== Endangered species protection ==
In 2023 several environmental protection groups asked the US federal government to speed up the process to give the Ghost Orchid protections under the Endangered Species Act. It is believed that there are only 1,500 plants left in Florida, in just a few places, one of them being the Audubon Corkscrew Swamp Sanctuary. The orchid is endangered due to poaching and loss of habitat.

== In popular culture ==
- The plant plays a pivotal role in the non-fiction book The Orchid Thief, by Susan Orlean, and the movie based on the book, Adaptation, although in the book the plant is yet in its former genus Polyrrhiza. The ghost orchid of Blair Audubon Corkscrew Swamp Sanctuary also inspired the novel Ghost Orchid by D. K. Christi.
- In the Netflix series Wednesday it is falsely stated that Dendrophylax lindenii was first discovered on The Isle of Wight in 1854 and is "carnivorous". It seems that the script writers Alfred Gough and Miles Millar confused it with another "ghost orchid", the European Epipogium aphyllum.
