= Amphonyx haxairei =

Scientific classification
- Kingdom: Animalia
- Phylum: Arthropoda
- Clade: Pancrustacea
- Class: Insecta
- Order: Lepidoptera
- Family: Sphingidae
- Genus: Amphonyx
- Species: A. haxairei

Binomial name
- Amphonyx haxairei (Cadiou, 2006)

Synonyms
- Cocytius haxairei Cadiou, 2006

Species of moth

Amphonyx haxairei is a moth of the family Sphingidae. It is known from Cuba and Hispaniola.

Adults are probably on wing year round. They nectar at flowers.

The larvae probably feed on Annonaceae species.
