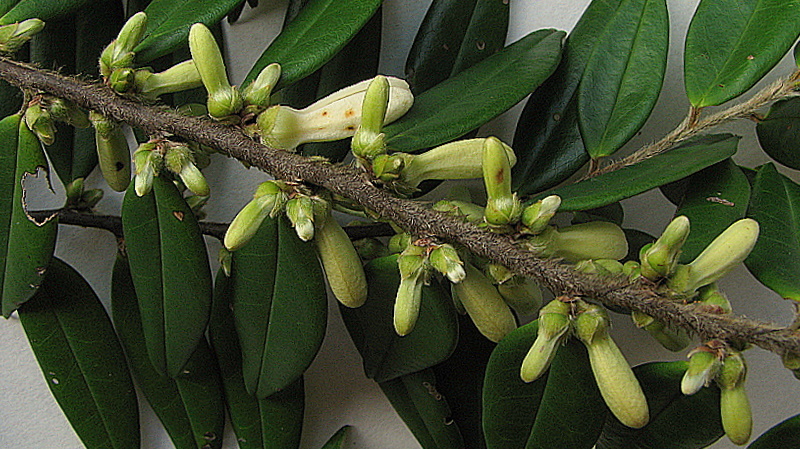

Conservation status
- Least Concern (IUCN 3.1)

Scientific classification
- Kingdom: Plantae
- Clade: Embryophytes
- Clade: Tracheophytes
- Clade: Spermatophytes
- Clade: Angiosperms
- Clade: Magnoliids
- Order: Magnoliales
- Family: Annonaceae
- Genus: Xylopia
- Species: X. frutescens

Binomial name
- Xylopia frutescens Aubl.

Varieties
- Xylopia frutescens var. ferruginea R.E.Fr.; Xylopia frutescens var. frutescens

Synonyms
- Xylopia frutescens var. ferruginea R.E.Fr.; Xylopia frutescens var. glabra S.Watson; Xylopia meridensis Pittier; Xylopia polyantha var. nicaraguensis R.E.Fr.; Xylopia setosa Poir.; Xylopicrum frutescens (Aubl.) Kuntze

= Xylopia frutescens =

Species of tree

Xylopia frutescens is a tree species the genus Xylopia and family Annonaceae. Its native range is southern Mexico through Cuba, Central America, and tropical South America to Bolivia and southern Brazil.

Two varieties are accepted:

- Xylopia frutescens var. ferruginea R.E.Fr. – northern Brazil, Peru, French Guiana, and Suriname
- Xylopia frutescens var. frutescens – southern Mexico to Cuba, Bolivia, and southern Brazil
