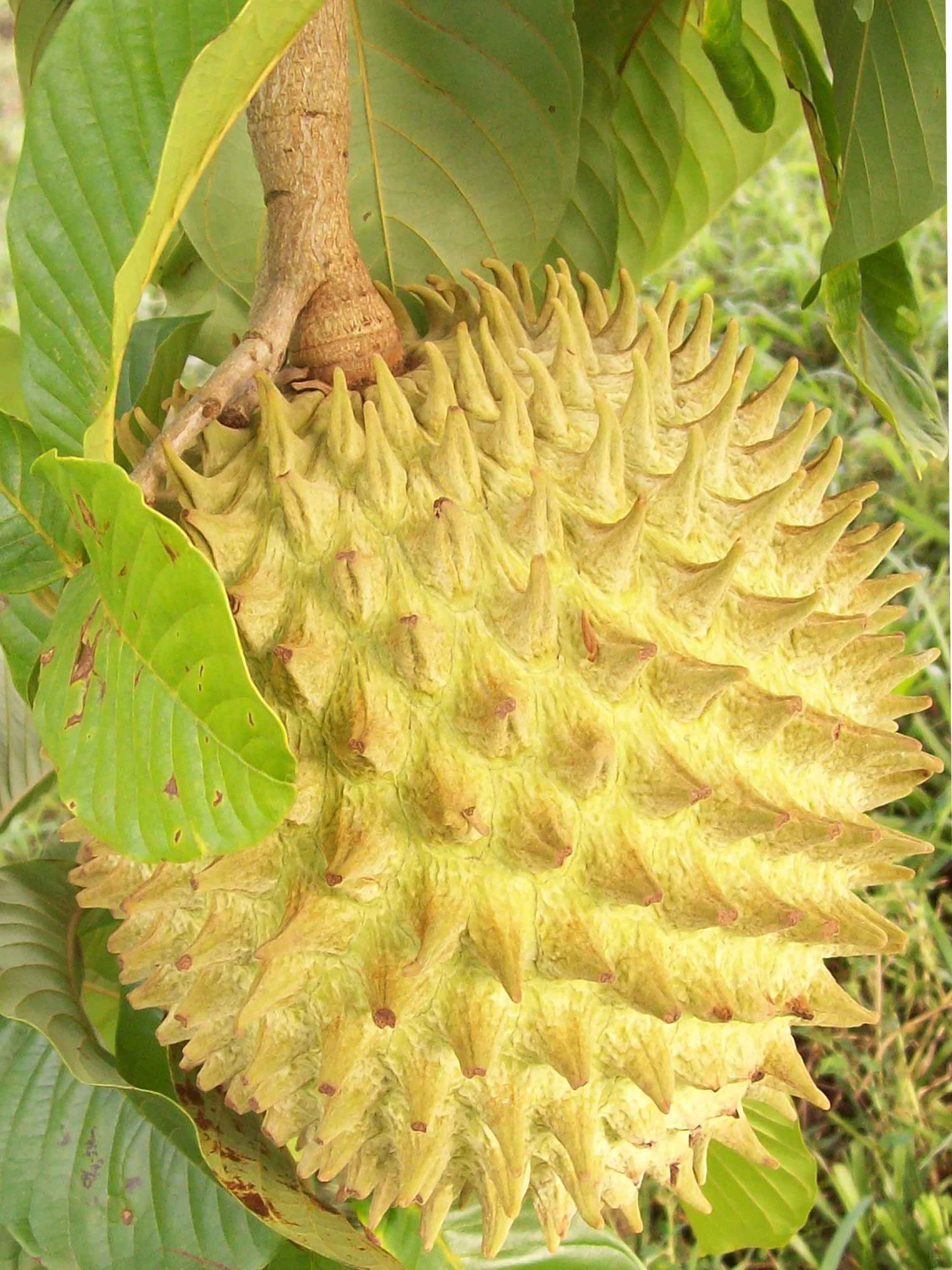

Conservation status
- Least Concern (IUCN 3.1)

Scientific classification
- Kingdom: Plantae
- Clade: Tracheophytes
- Clade: Angiosperms
- Clade: Magnoliids
- Order: Magnoliales
- Family: Annonaceae
- Genus: Annona
- Species: A. purpurea

Binomial name
- Annona purpurea Moc. & Sessé ex Dunal

Synonyms
- Annona involucrata Baill.; Annona manirote Kunth; Annona prestoei Hemsl.

= Annona purpurea =

Species of tree

Annona purpurea is an edible fruit and medicinal plant in the Annonaceae family. It is native to central and southern Mexico, Central America, Colombia, Ecuador, and Venezuela in northwestern South America, and Trinidad. Its common names include soncoya, sincuya, and cabeza de negro.

== Description ==
It is a small tree reaching a maximum of 6 to 10 metres (20 to 33 ft). It is deciduous with hairy leaves and large, strong-scented flowers. Its pollen is shed as permanent tetrads.

The fruit is rounded, 15–20 cm (5.9–7.9 in) wide, and covered with a felt-textured brown skin that is hard to cut open when ripe. The surface of the fruit has hooklike projections and superficially resembles a durian. It has many seeds which have a germination time of 1 to 6 months. Trees take about 1 to 3 years to bear and can be container grown. This species is closely related to the cherimoya, the sugar-apple and other species of Annona. The soncoya is fairly obscure in the genus; the fruit is of indifferent quality and has not attracted wide cultivation. The fruit has a texture like the soursop which some may describe as stringy or fibrous.
