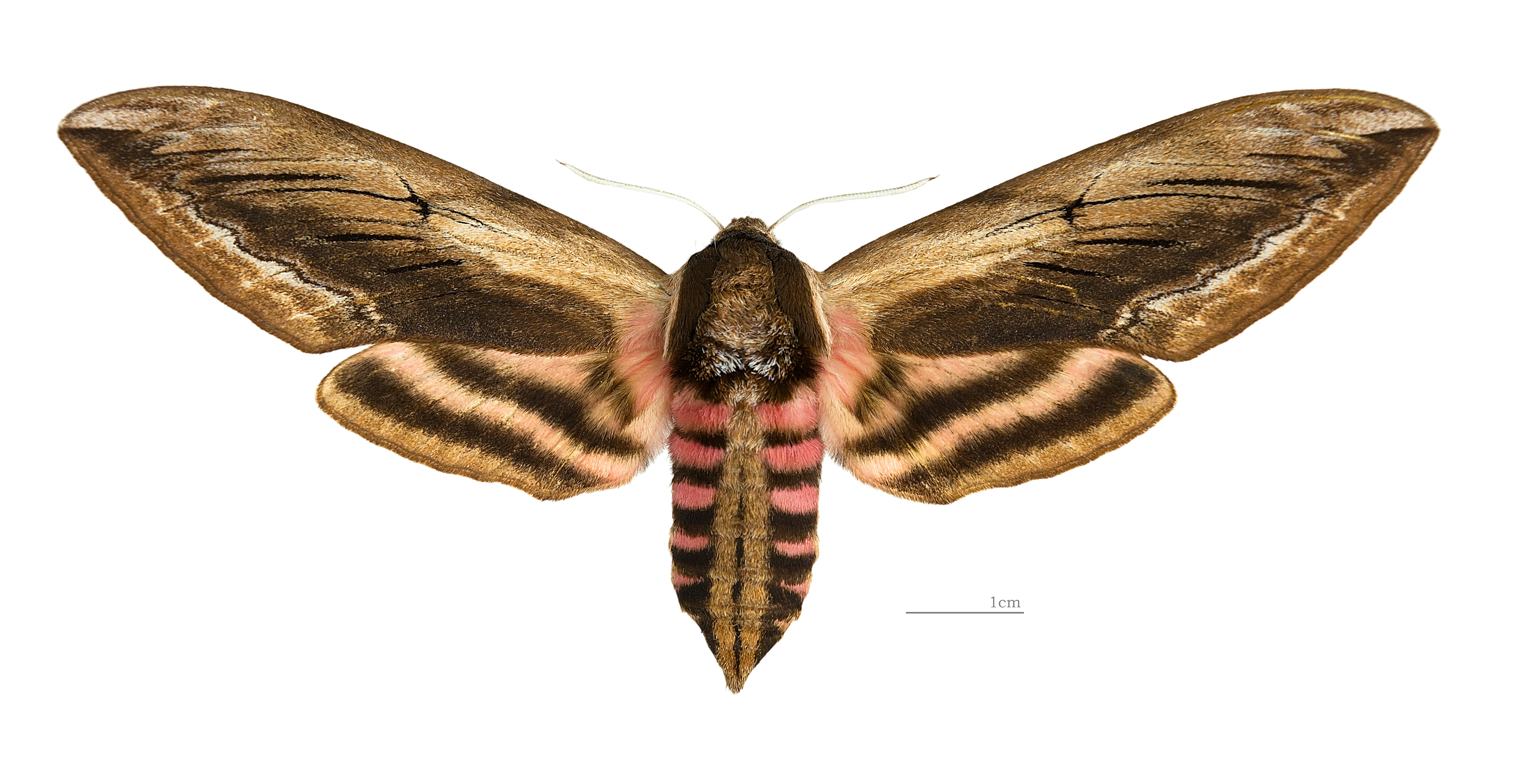
- Sphinx ligustri

Scientific classification
- Kingdom: Animalia
- Phylum: Arthropoda
- Class: Insecta
- Order: Lepidoptera
- Family: Sphingidae
- Subfamily: Sphinginae
- Tribe: Sphingini; Latreille, [1802]

Genera
- See text

= Sphingini =

Tribe of moths

Sphingini is a tribe of moths of the family Sphingidae. The tribe was described by Pierre André Latreille in 1802.

== Taxonomy ==
- Genus Amphimoea
- Genus Amphonyx
- Genus Apocalypsis
- Genus Ceratomia
- Genus Cocytius
- Genus Dolba
- Genus Dolbogene
- Genus Dovania
- Genus Ellenbeckia
- Genus Euryglottis
- Genus Hoplistopus
- Genus Ihlegramma
- Genus Isoparce
- Genus Lapara
- Genus Leucomonia
- Genus Lintneria
- Genus Litosphingia
- Genus Lomocyma
- Genus Macropoliana
- Genus Manduca
- Genus Meganoton
- Genus Morcocytius
- Genus Nannoparce
- Genus Neococytius
- Genus Neogene
- Genus Oligographa
- Genus Panogena
- Genus Pantophaea
- Genus Paratrea
- Genus Poliana
- Genus Praedora
- Genus Pseudococytius
- Genus Pseudodolbina
- Genus Psilogramma
- Genus Sagenosoma
- Genus †Sphingidites
- Genus Sphinx
- Genus Thamnoecha
- Genus Xanthopan

== Gallery ==
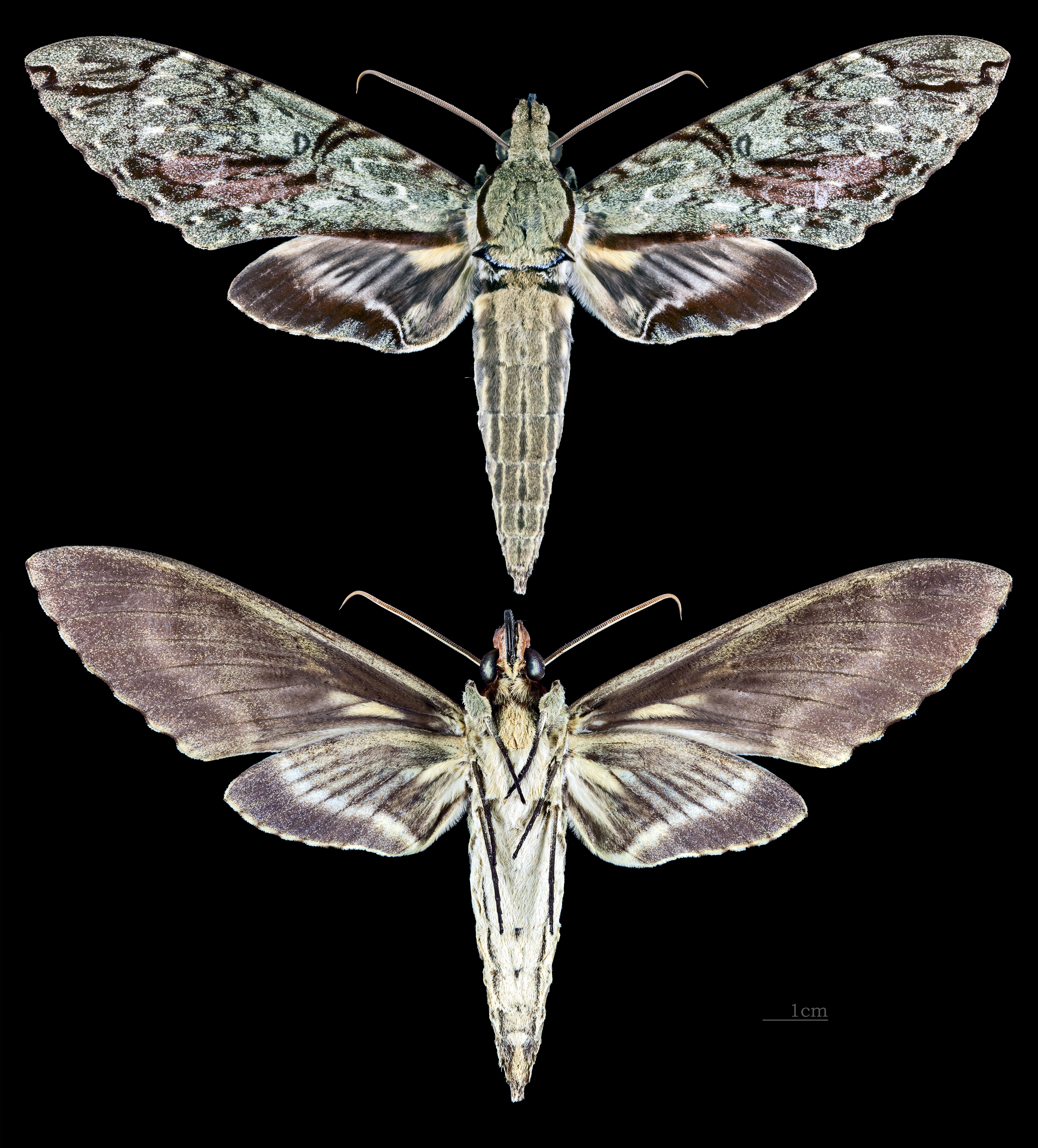
Amphimoea

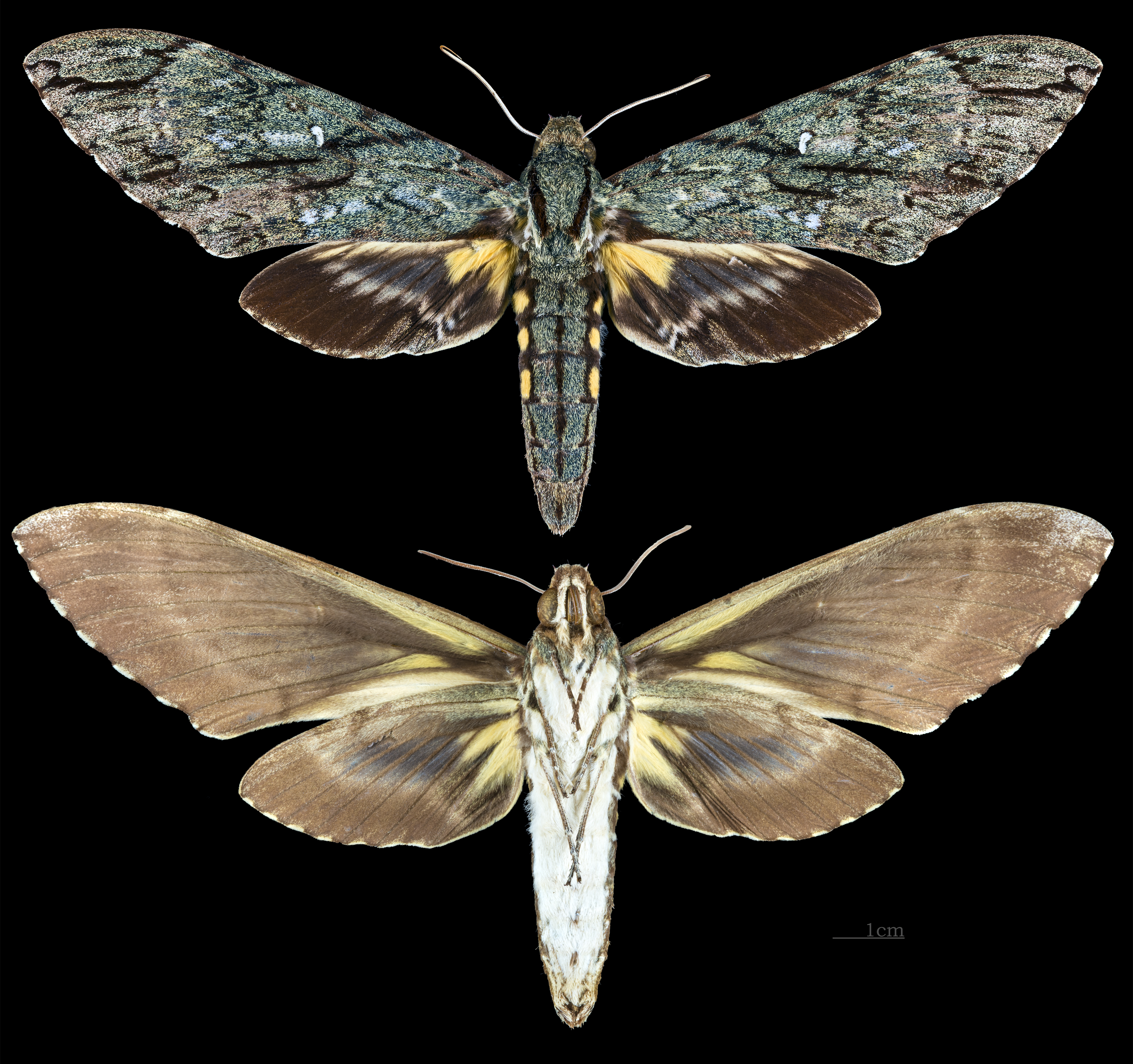
Amphonyx

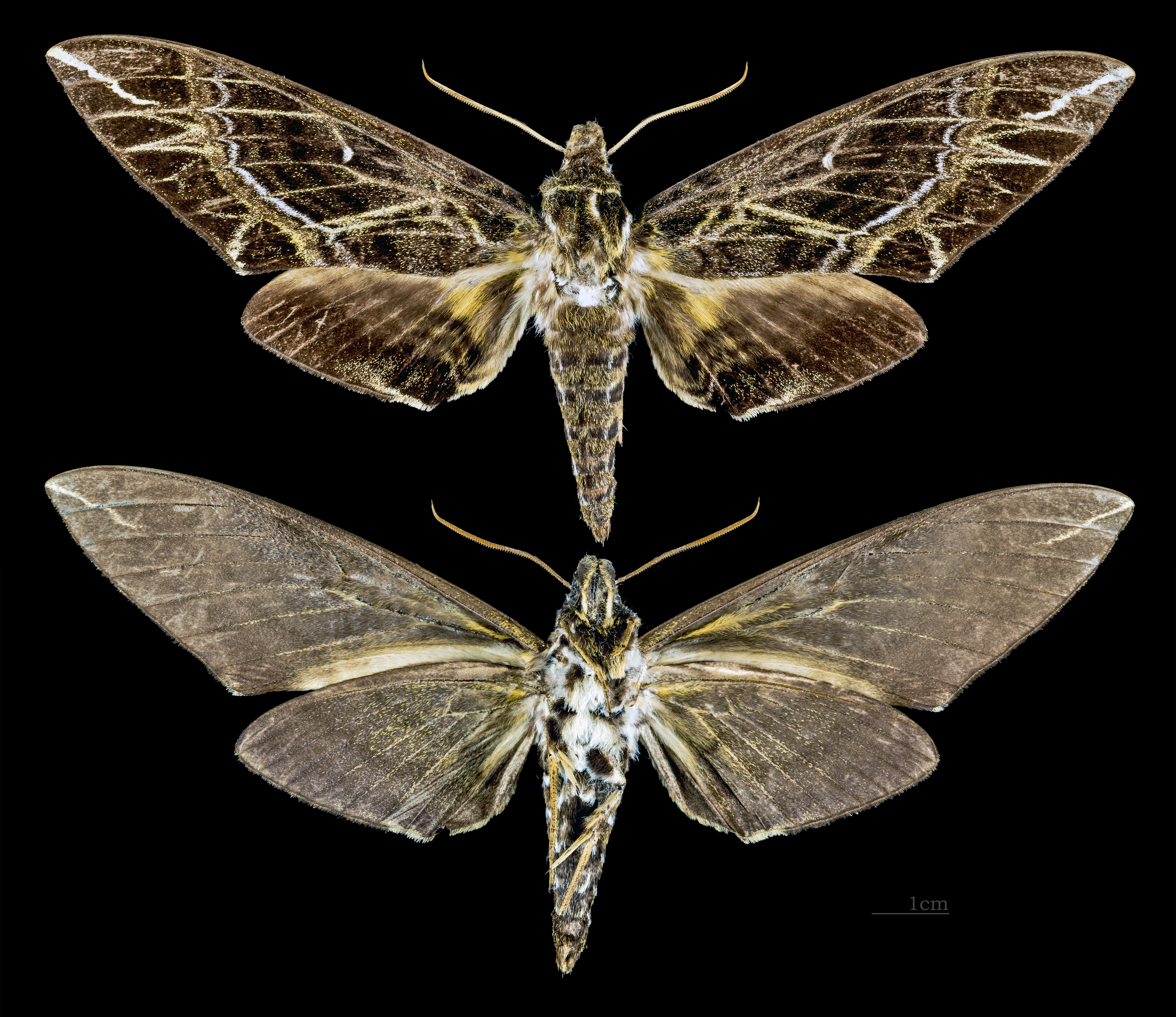
Apocalypsis

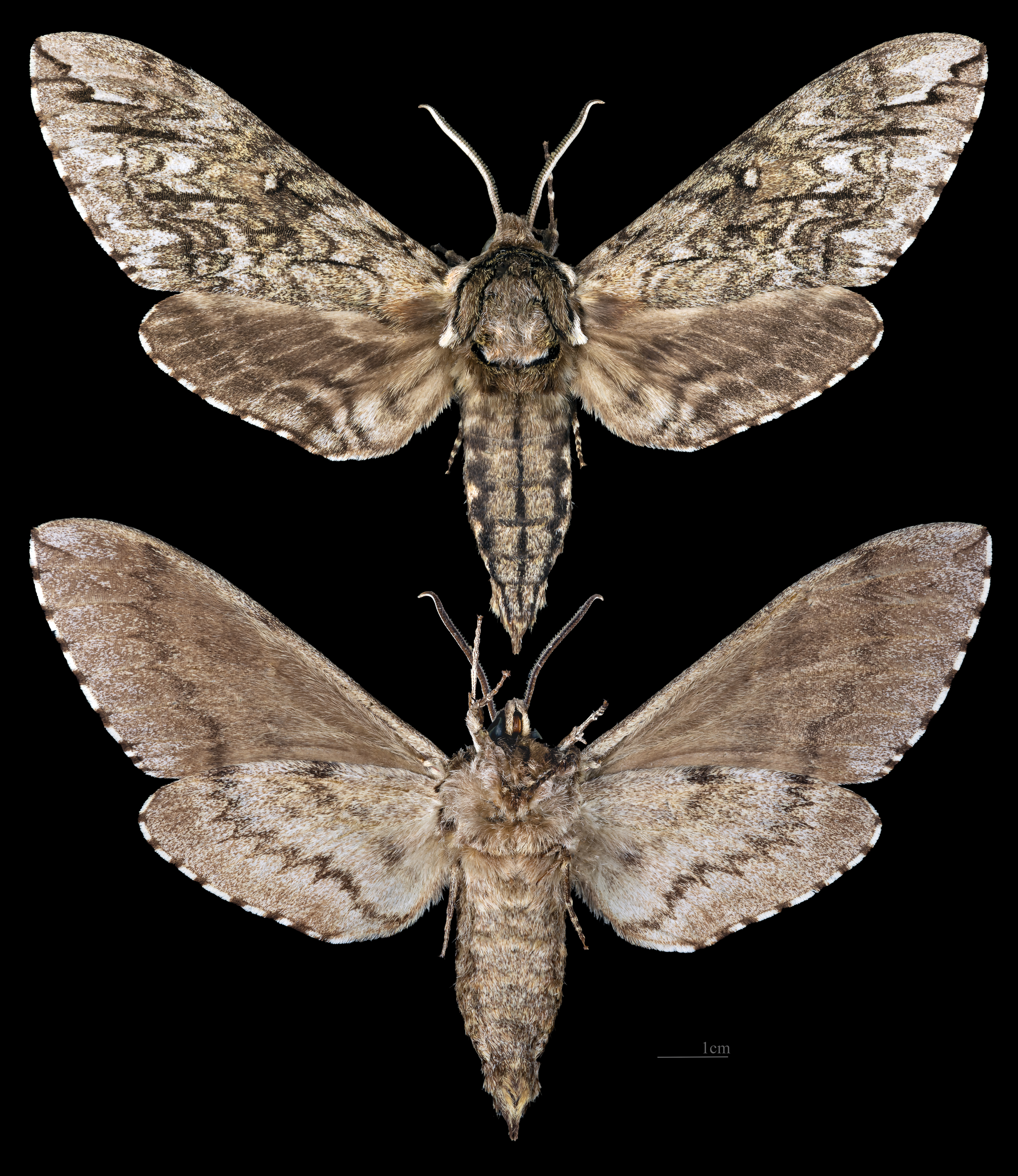
Ceratomia

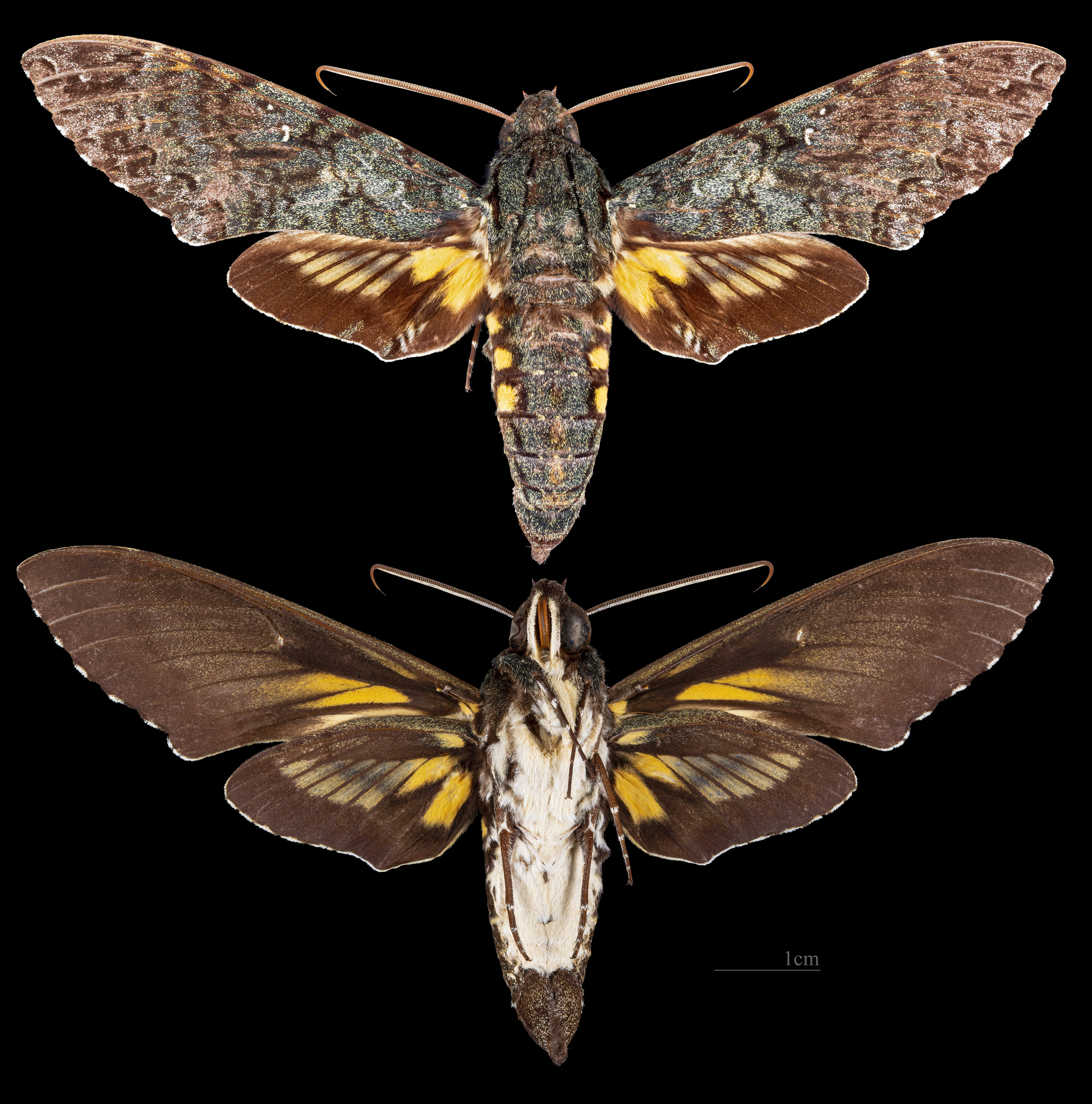
Cocytius

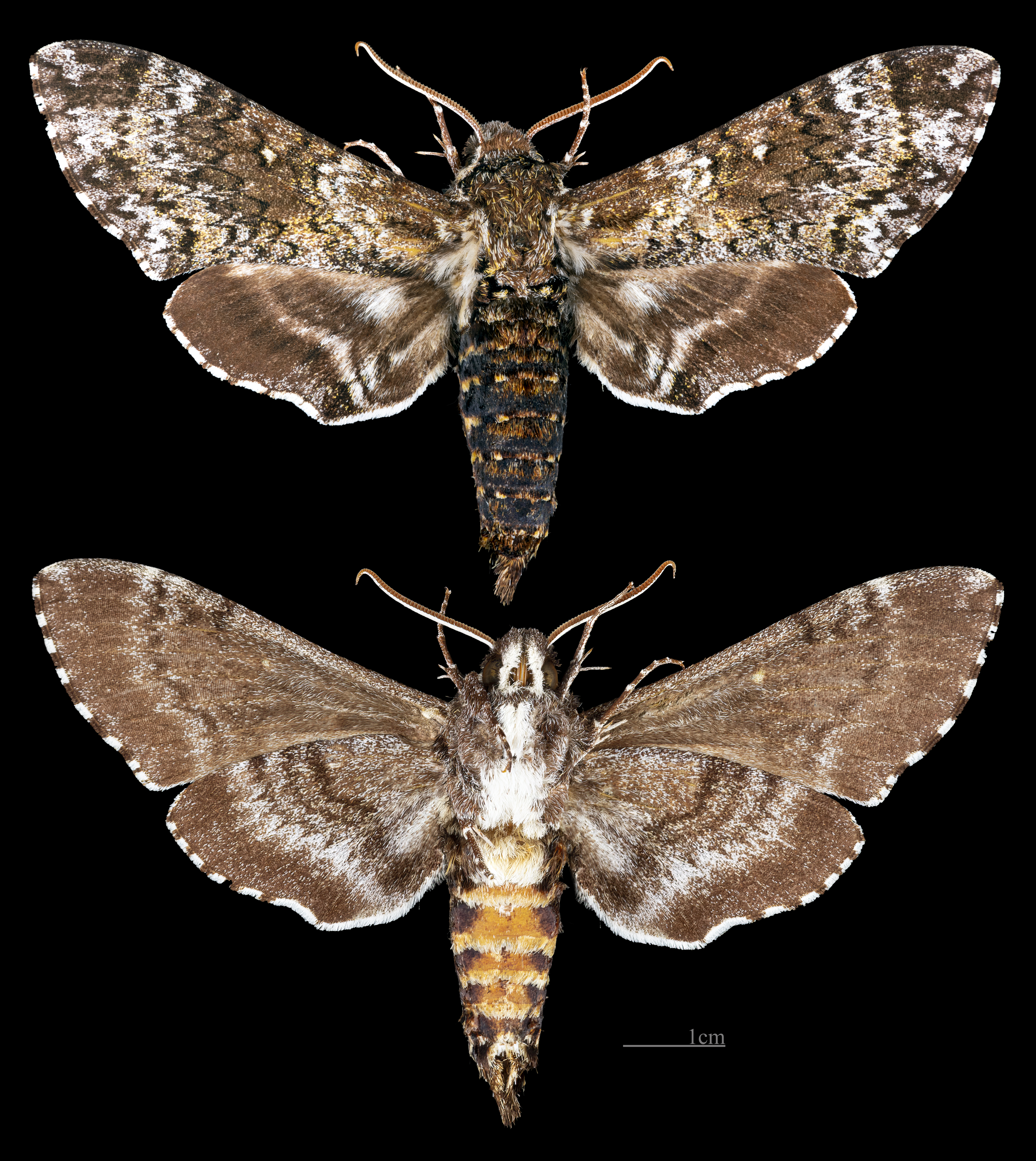
Dolba

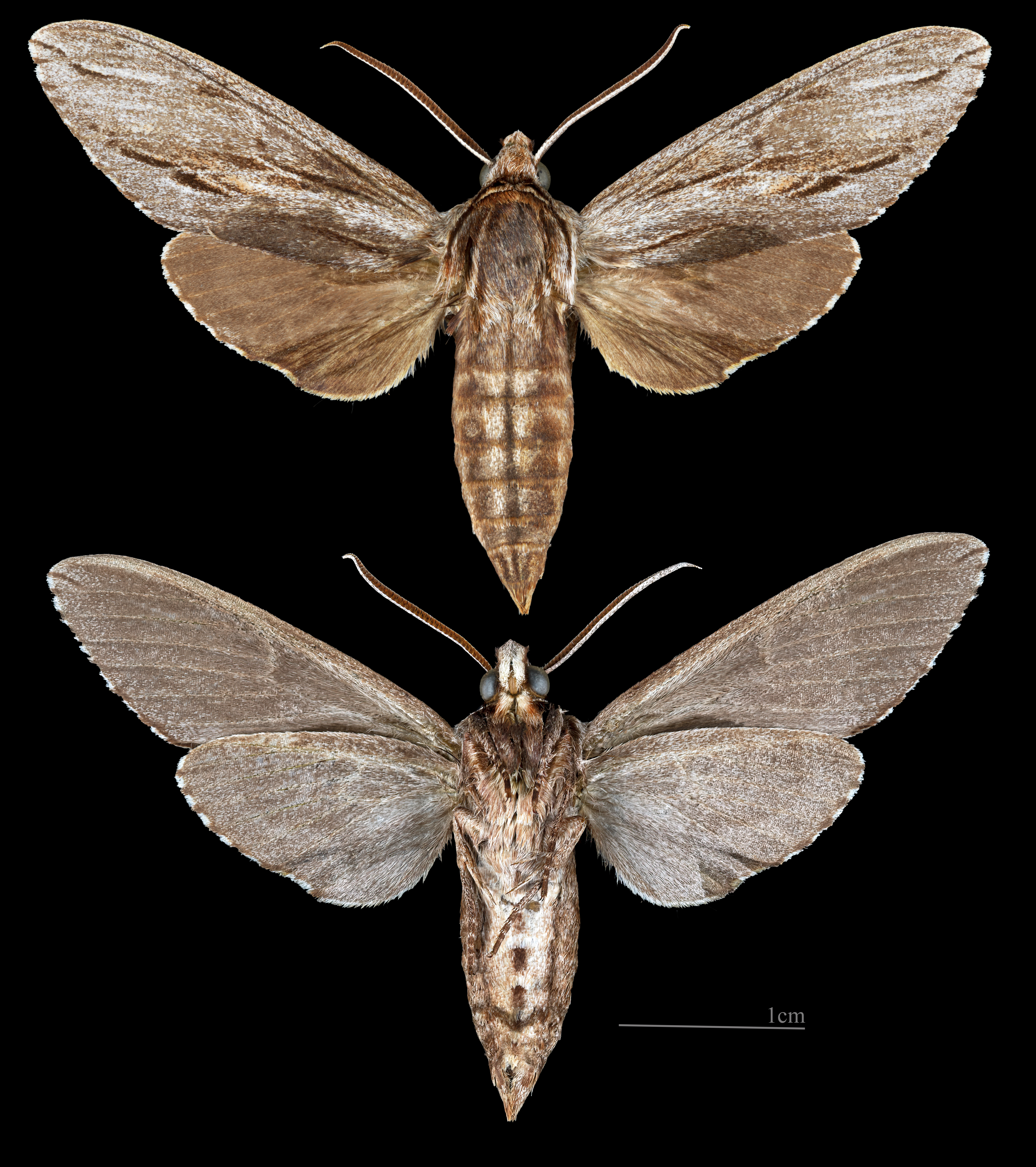
Isoparce

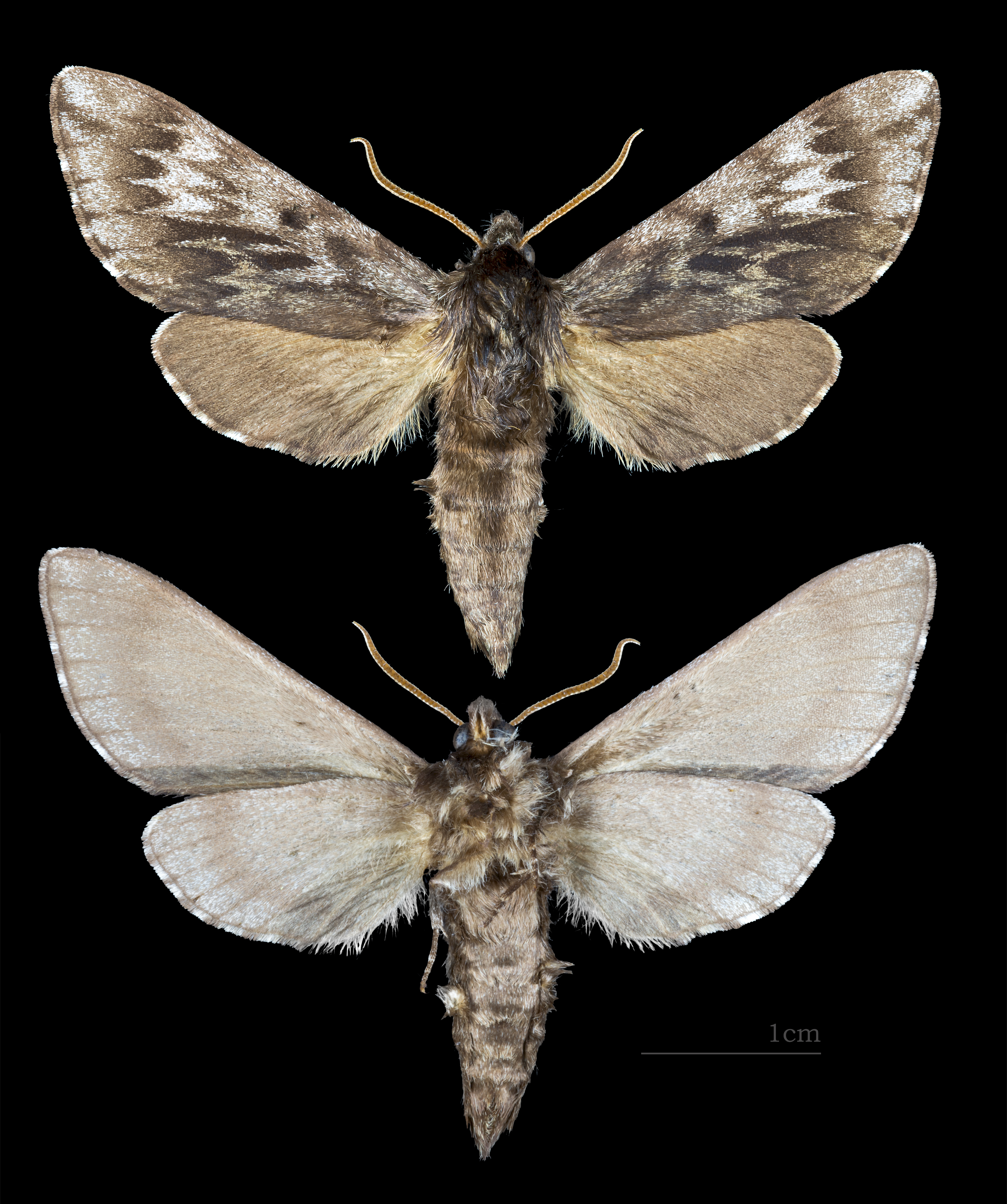
Lapara

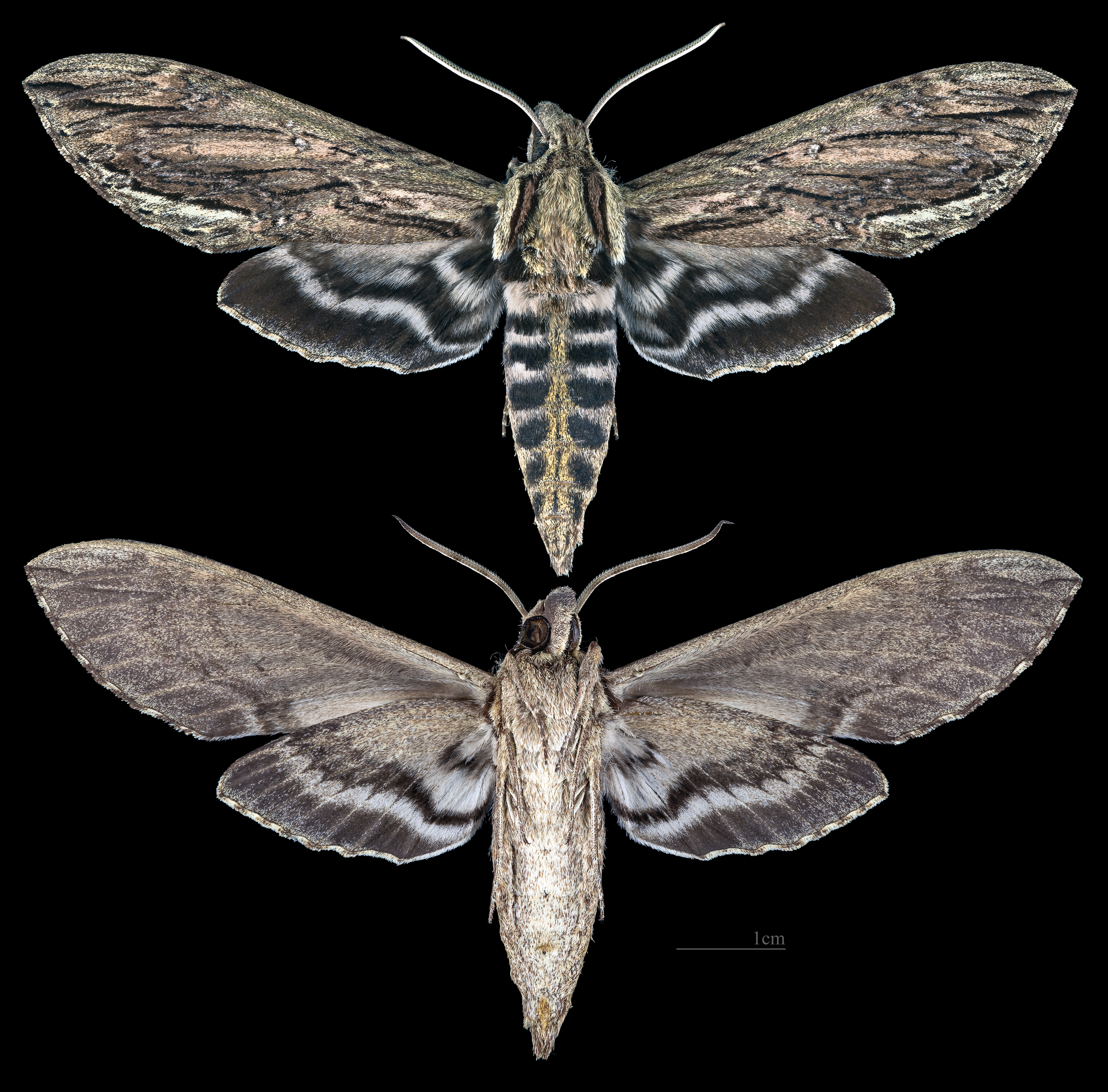
Lintneria

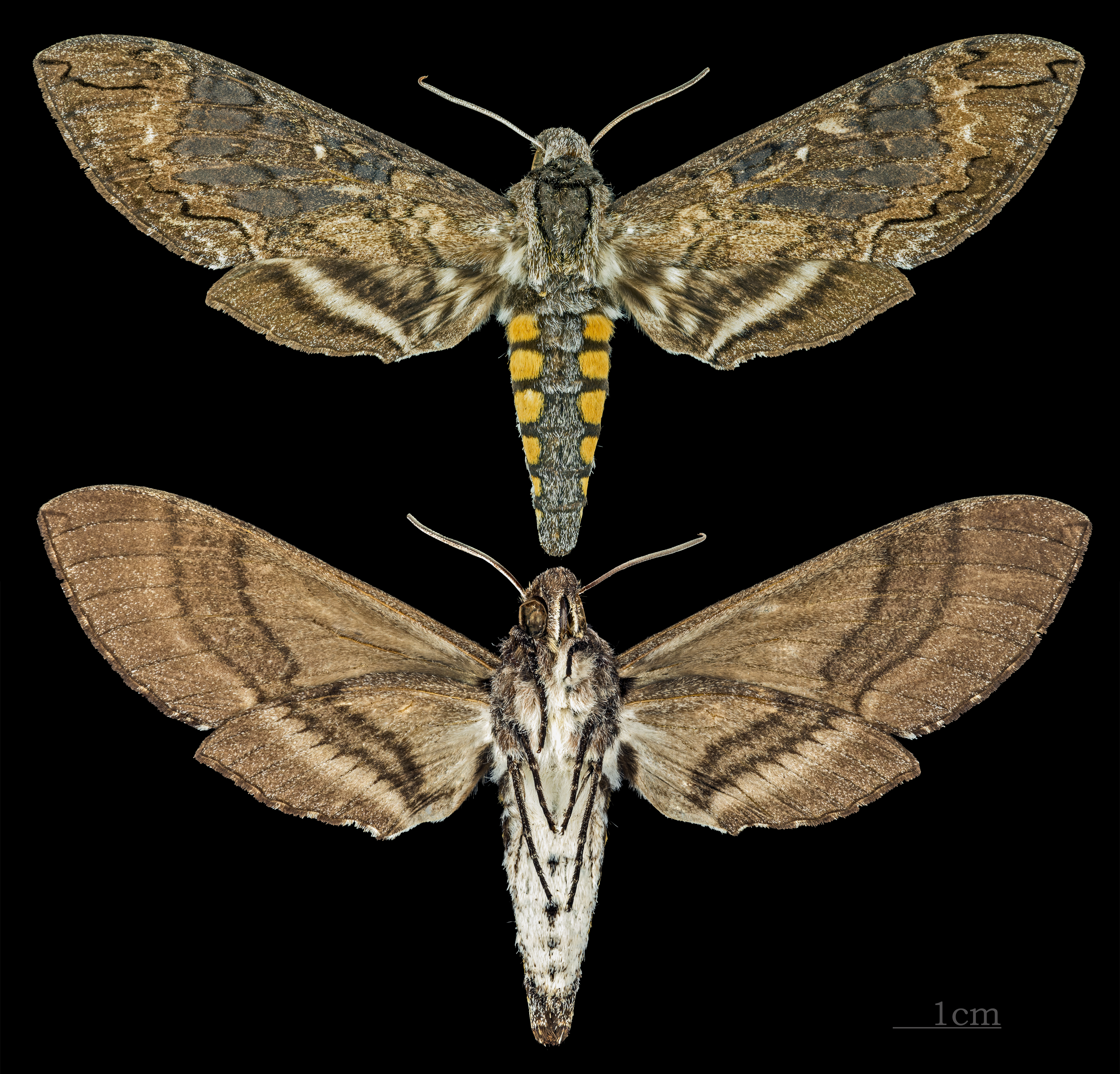
Manduca

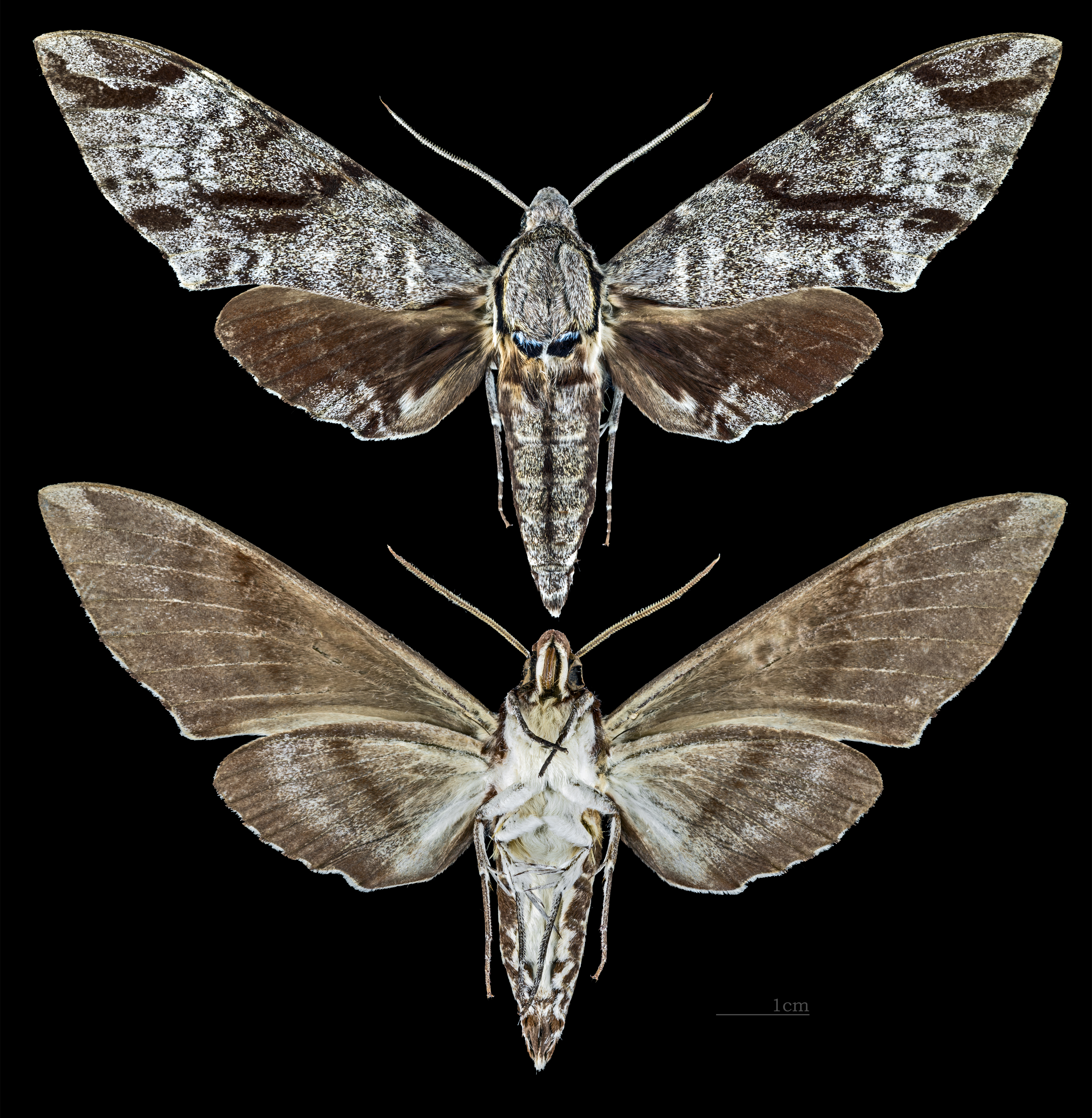
Meganoton

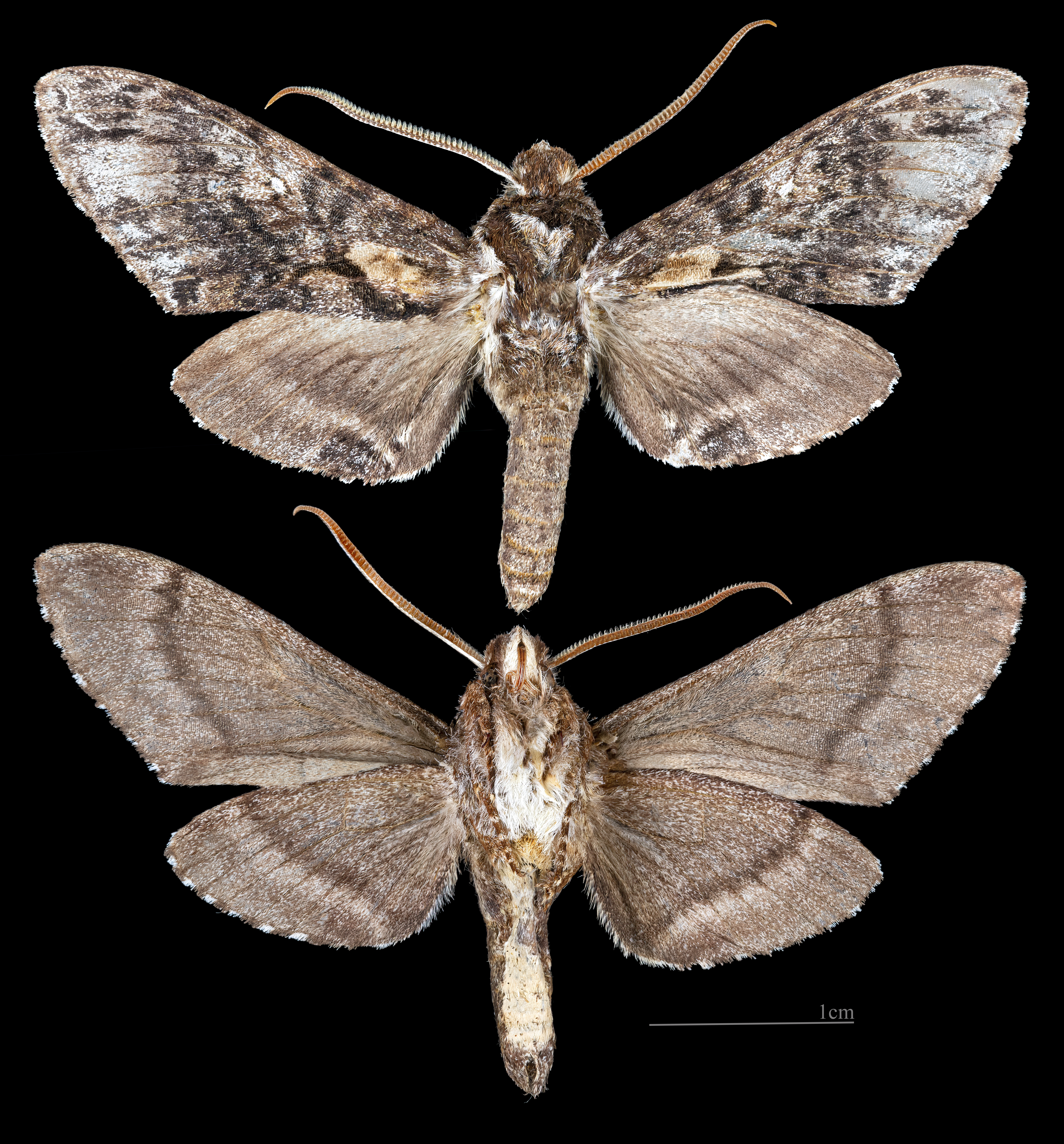
Nannoparce balsa

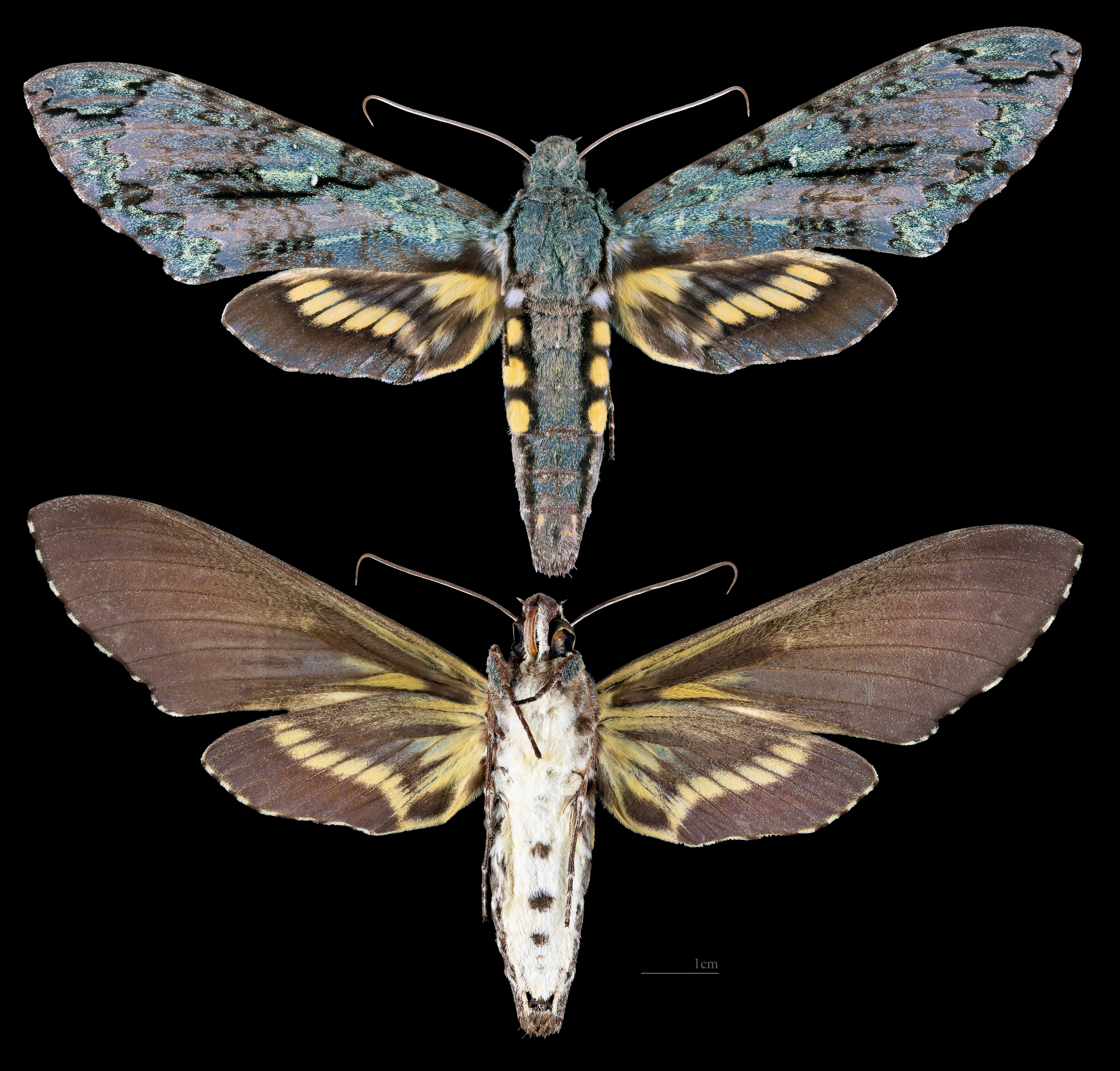
Pseudococytius

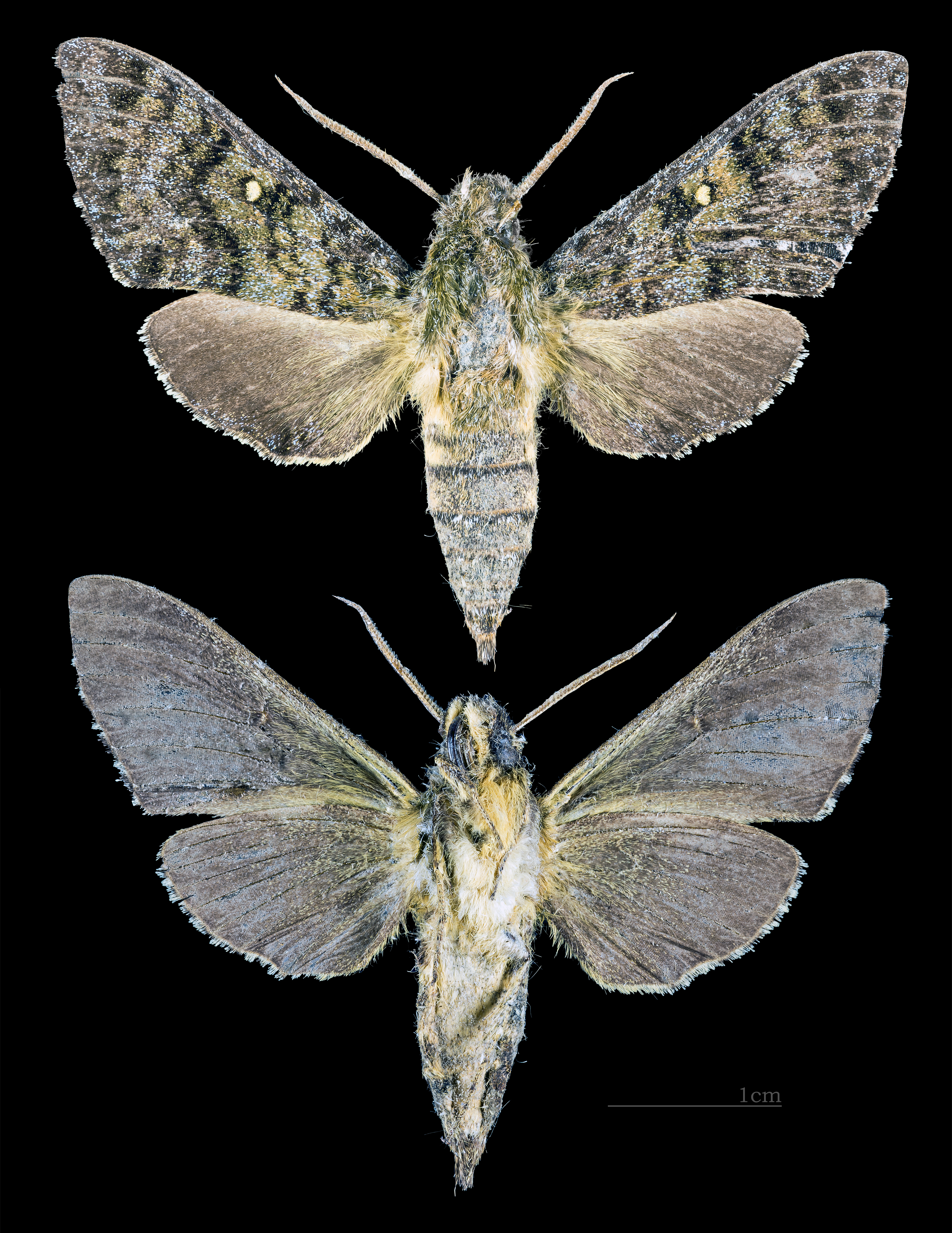
Pseudodolbina

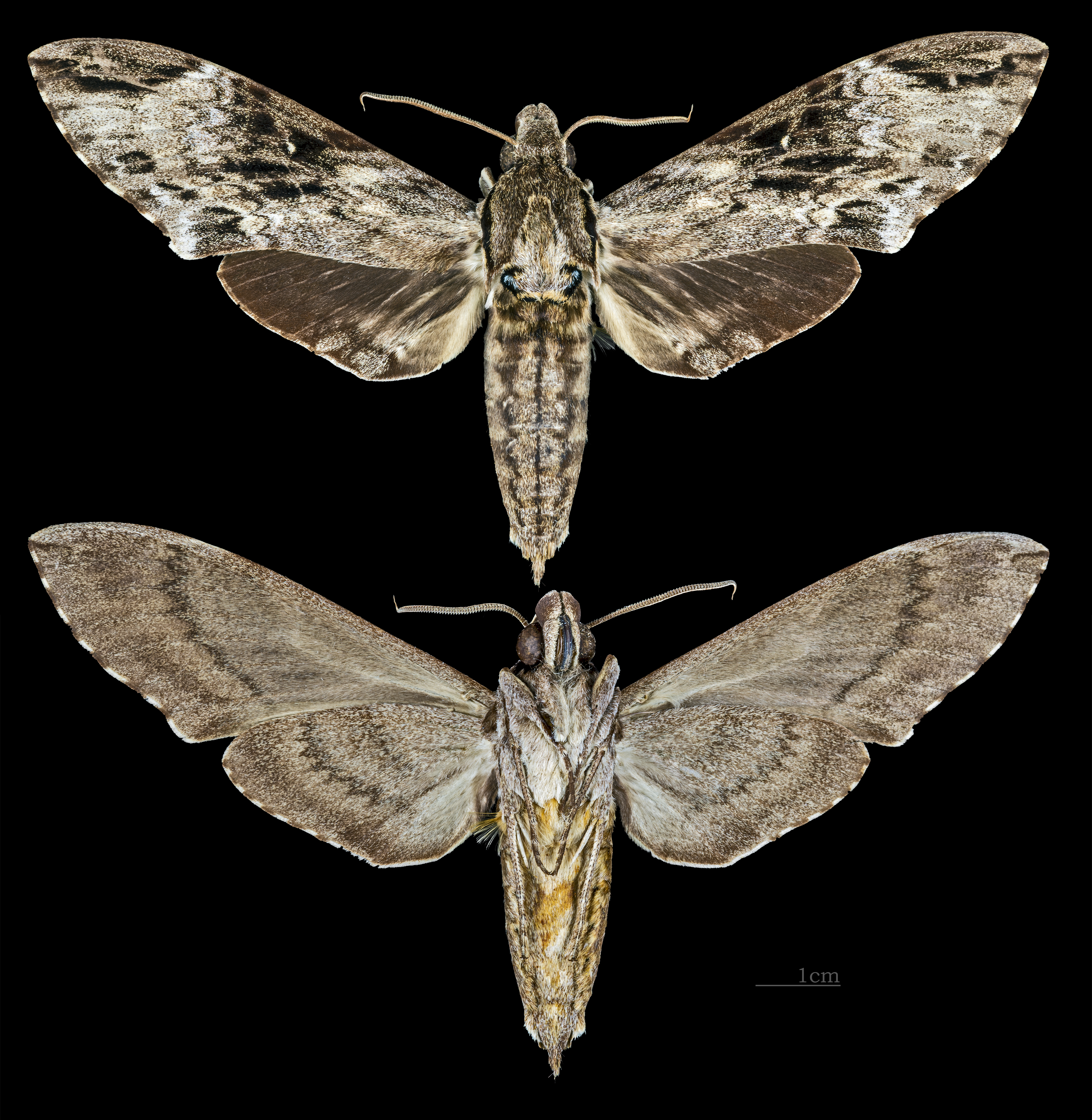
Psilogramma

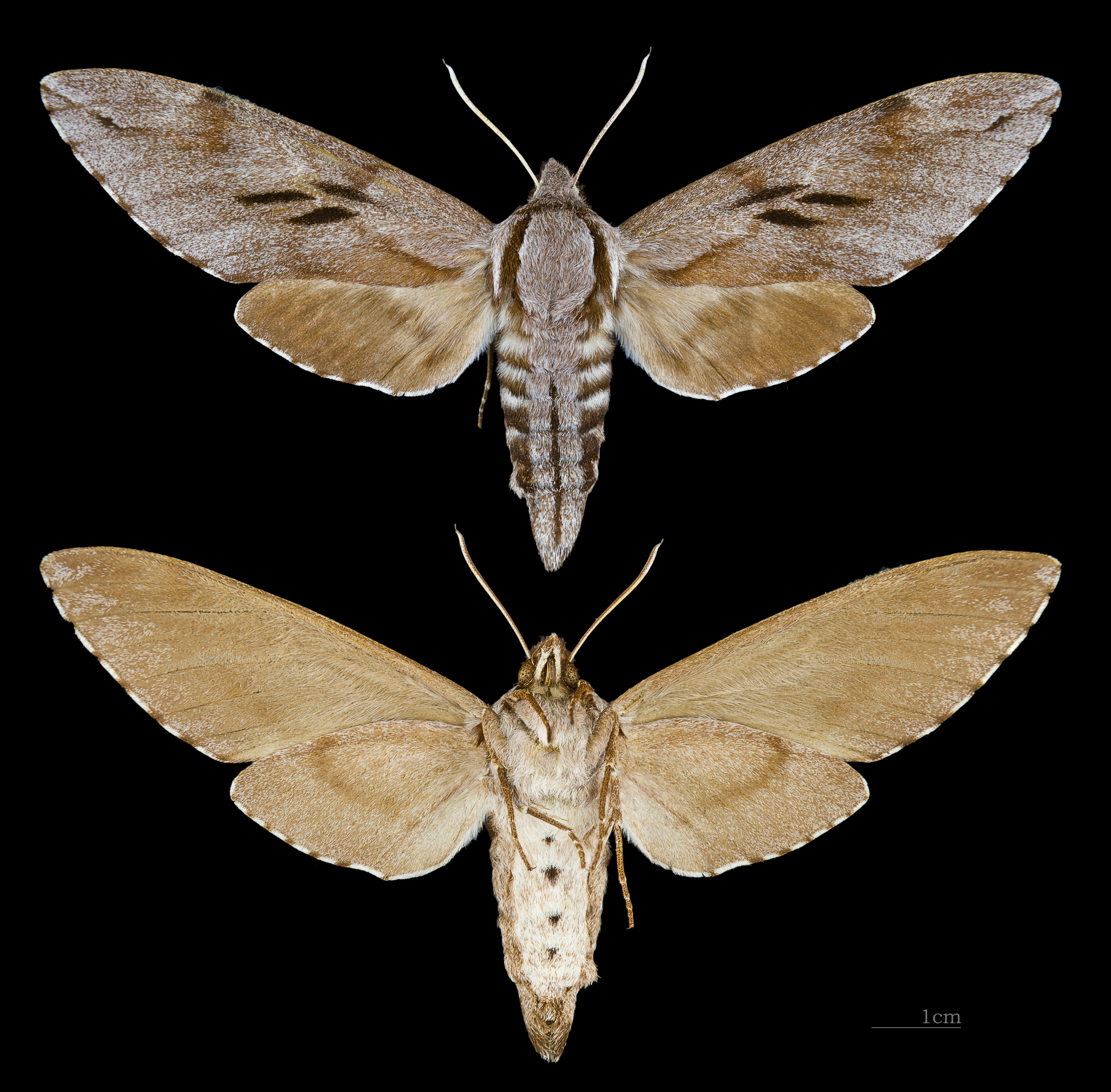
Sphinx
