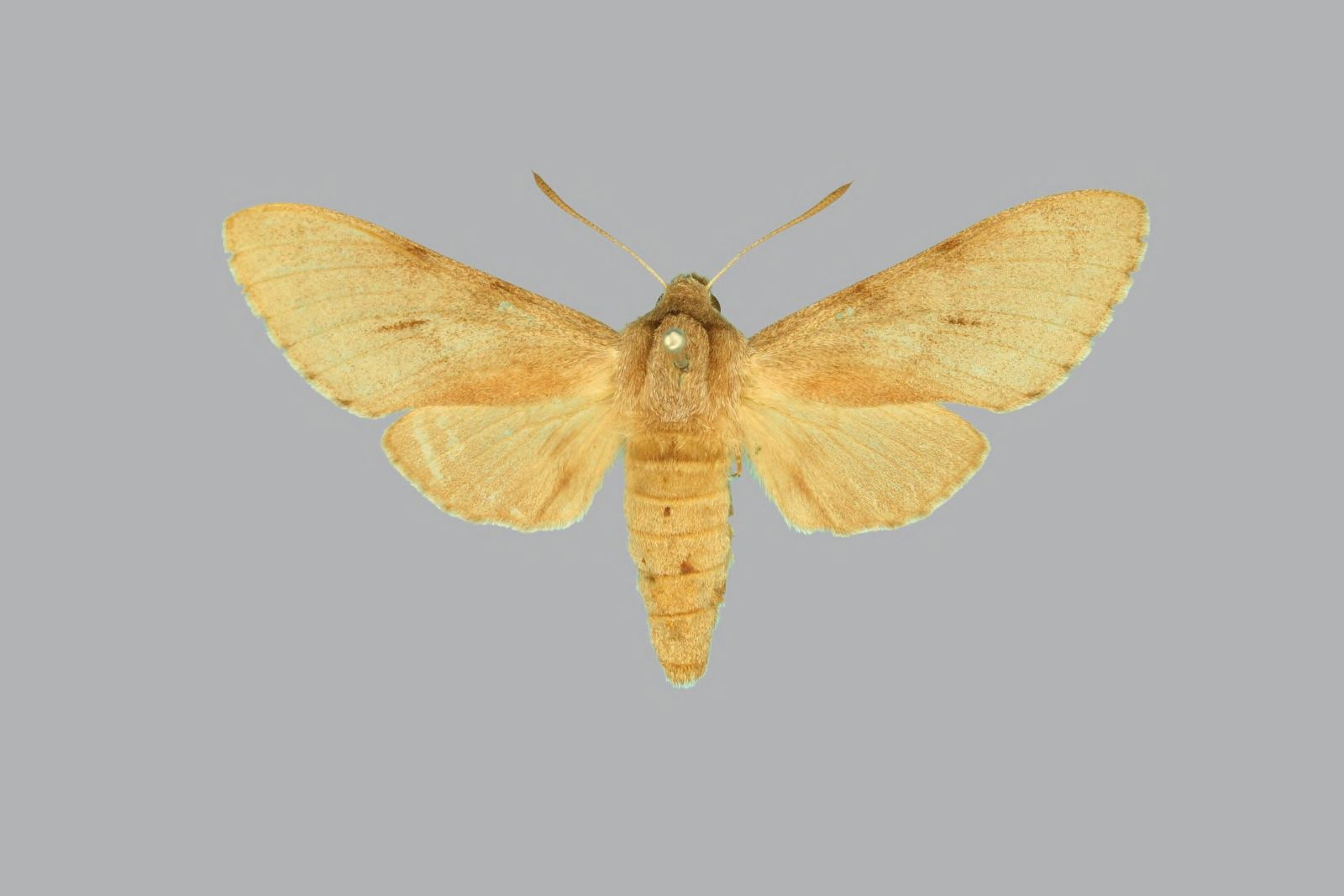
- Female, upperside, from Shimla in India

Scientific classification
- Kingdom: Animalia
- Phylum: Arthropoda
- Class: Insecta
- Order: Lepidoptera
- Family: Sphingidae
- Tribe: Sphingini
- Genus: Thamnoecha; Rothschild & Jordan, 1903
- Species: T. uniformis

Binomial name
- Thamnoecha uniformis (Butler, 1875)

Synonyms
- Hyloicus uniformis Butler, 1875; Pseudosphinx concolor Hampson, 1893

= Thamnoecha =

Genus of moths

Thamnoecha is a monotypic moth genus in the family Sphingidae erected by Walter Rothschild and Karl Jordan in 1903. Its only species, Thamnoecha uniformis, first described by Arthur Gardiner Butler in 1875, is known from the Himalayas.

The wingspan is 50–54 mm for males and 53–66 mm for females. It is similar in colour to Sphinx pinastri and Sphinx caligineus. Adults are on wing from March to August.

The larval food plant is thought to be chir pine (Pinus roxburghii).
