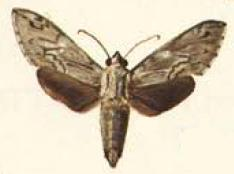

Scientific classification
- Domain: Eukaryota
- Kingdom: Animalia
- Phylum: Arthropoda
- Class: Insecta
- Order: Lepidoptera
- Family: Sphingidae
- Tribe: Sphingini
- Genus: Oligographa; Rothschild & Jordan, 1903
- Species: O. juniperi

Binomial name
- Oligographa juniperi (Boisduval, 1847)

Synonyms
- Sphinx juniperi Boisduval, 1847; Anceryx juniperi Walker, 1856; Oligographa mosambiquensis Joicey & Kaye, 1917

= Oligographa =

Genus of moths

Oligographa is a genus of moths in the family Sphingidae, containing one species Oligographa juniperi, which is known from South Africa and Mozambique. The species is commonly known as the juniper hawk moth.
