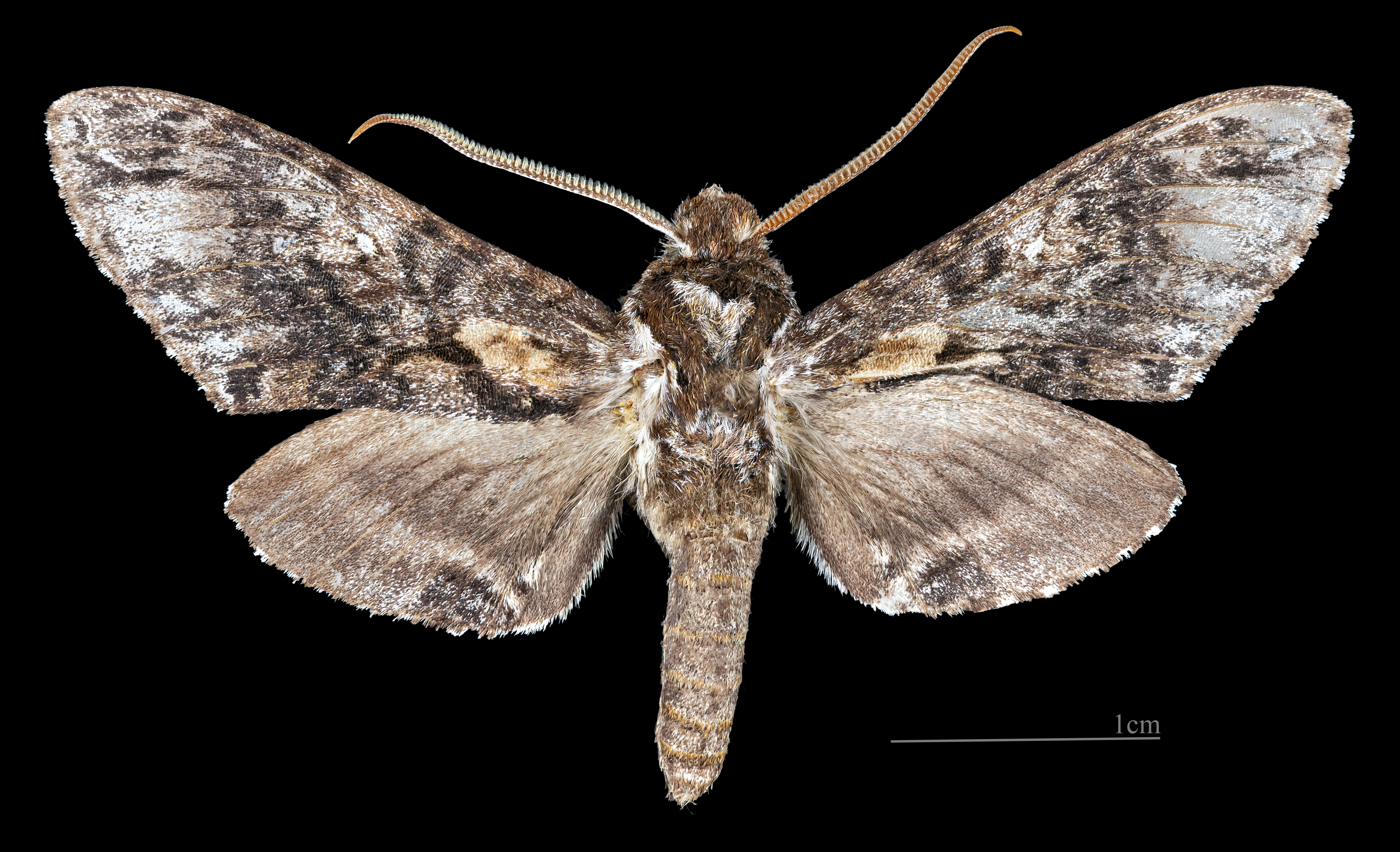
- Nannoparce balsa

Scientific classification
- Kingdom: Animalia
- Phylum: Arthropoda
- Clade: Pancrustacea
- Class: Insecta
- Order: Lepidoptera
- Family: Sphingidae
- Tribe: Sphingini
- Genus: Nannoparce; Rothschild & Jordan, 1903

= Nannoparce =

Genus of moths

Nannoparce is a genus of moths in the family Sphingidae. The genus was erected by Walter Rothschild and Karl Jordan in 1903.

== Species ==
- Nannoparce balsa Schaus 1932
- Nannoparce poeyi (Grote 1865)
