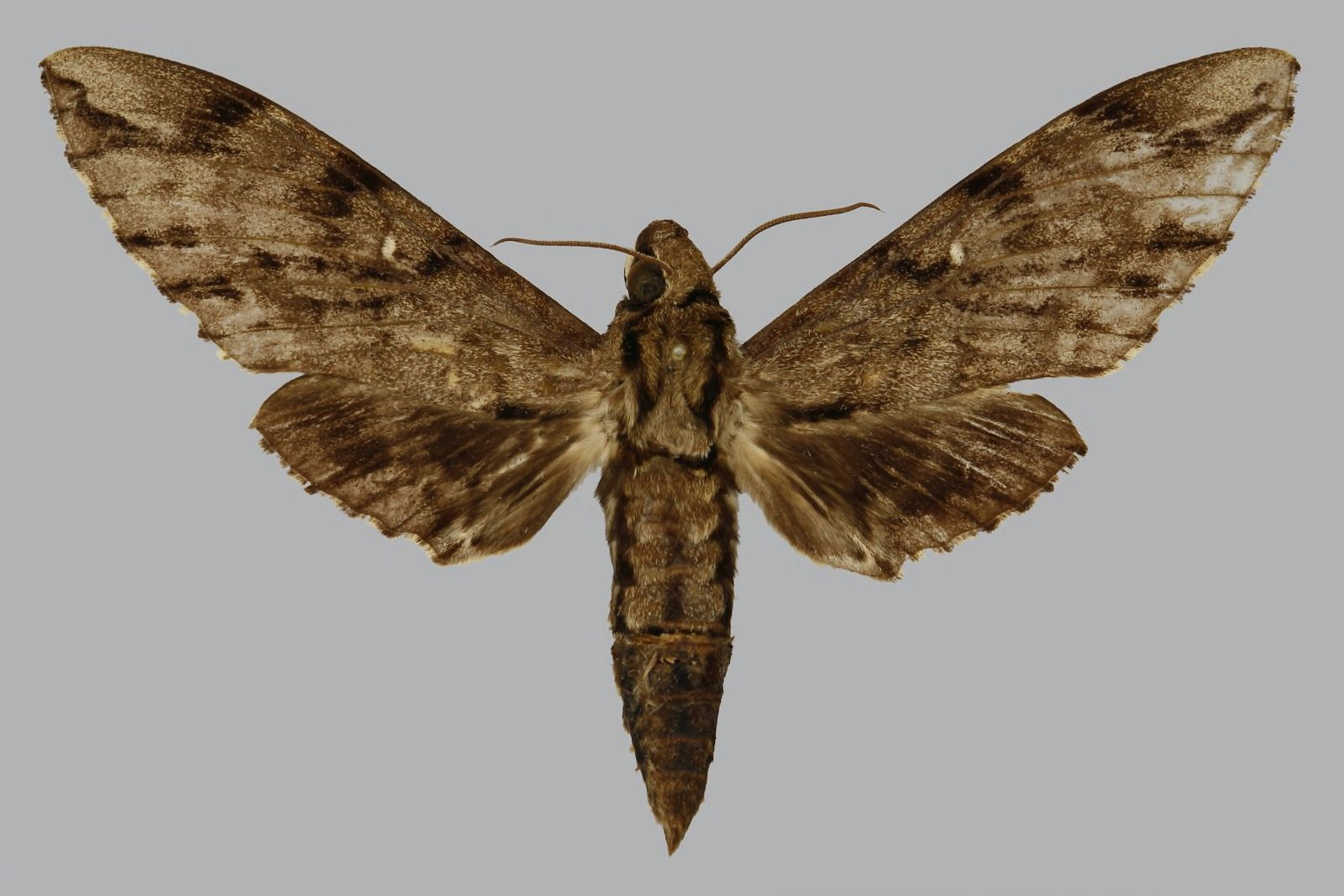

Scientific classification
- Kingdom: Animalia
- Phylum: Arthropoda
- Class: Insecta
- Order: Lepidoptera
- Family: Sphingidae
- Tribe: Sphingini
- Genus: Ihlegramma; Eitschberger, 2003
- Species: I. ihlei

Binomial name
- Ihlegramma ihlei Eitschberger, 2003

= Ihlegramma =

Genus of moths

Ihlegramma is a genus of moths in the family Sphingidae containing only one known species, Ihlegramma ihlei, which is known from northern Laos. Both the genus and species were first described by Ulf Eitschberger in 2003 and are named for Thomas Ihle, the collector of the type series.

The wingspan is about 86–93 mm (3.4–3.7 in) in males and 100 mm (3.9 in) in one female.
