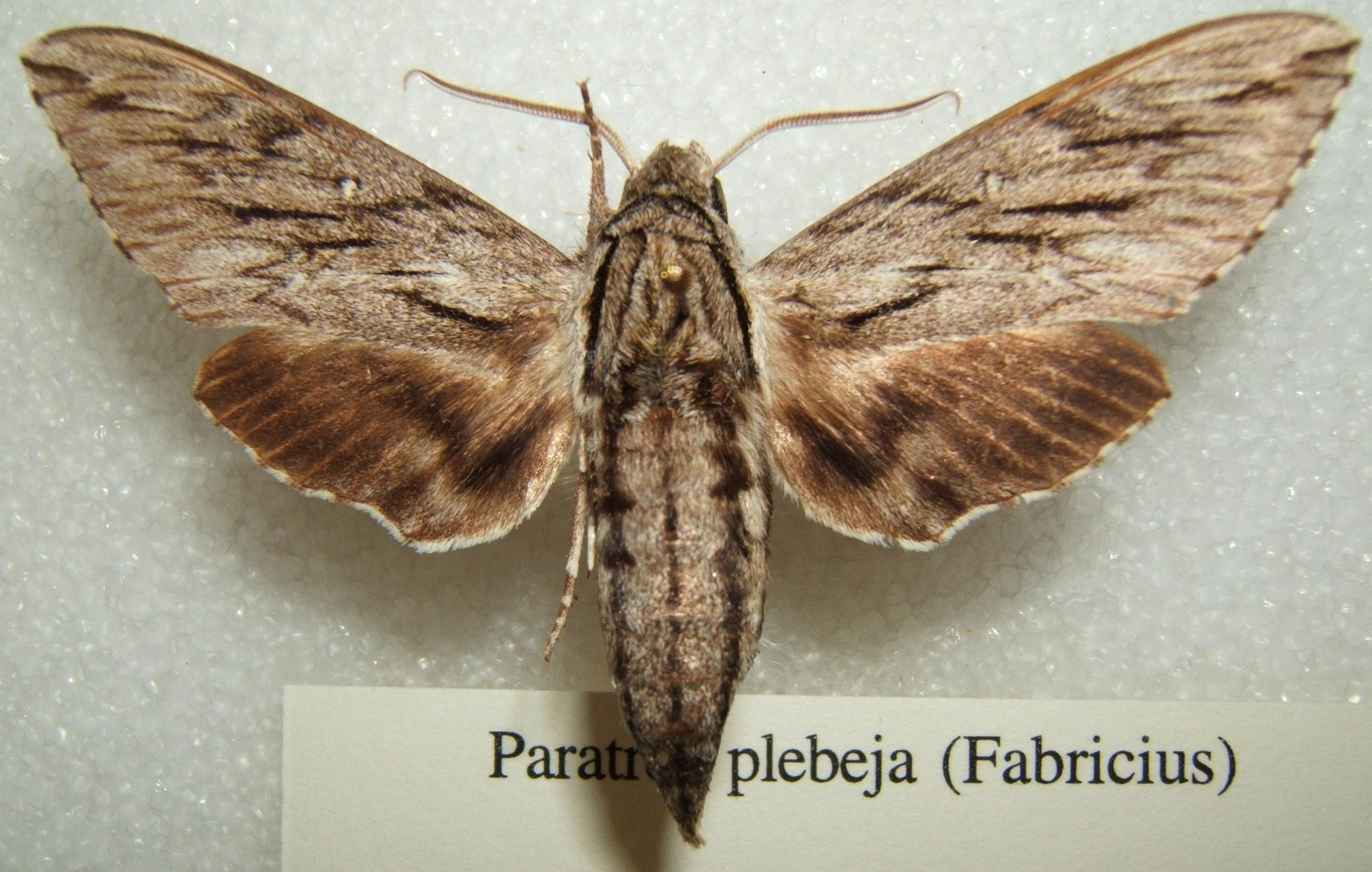

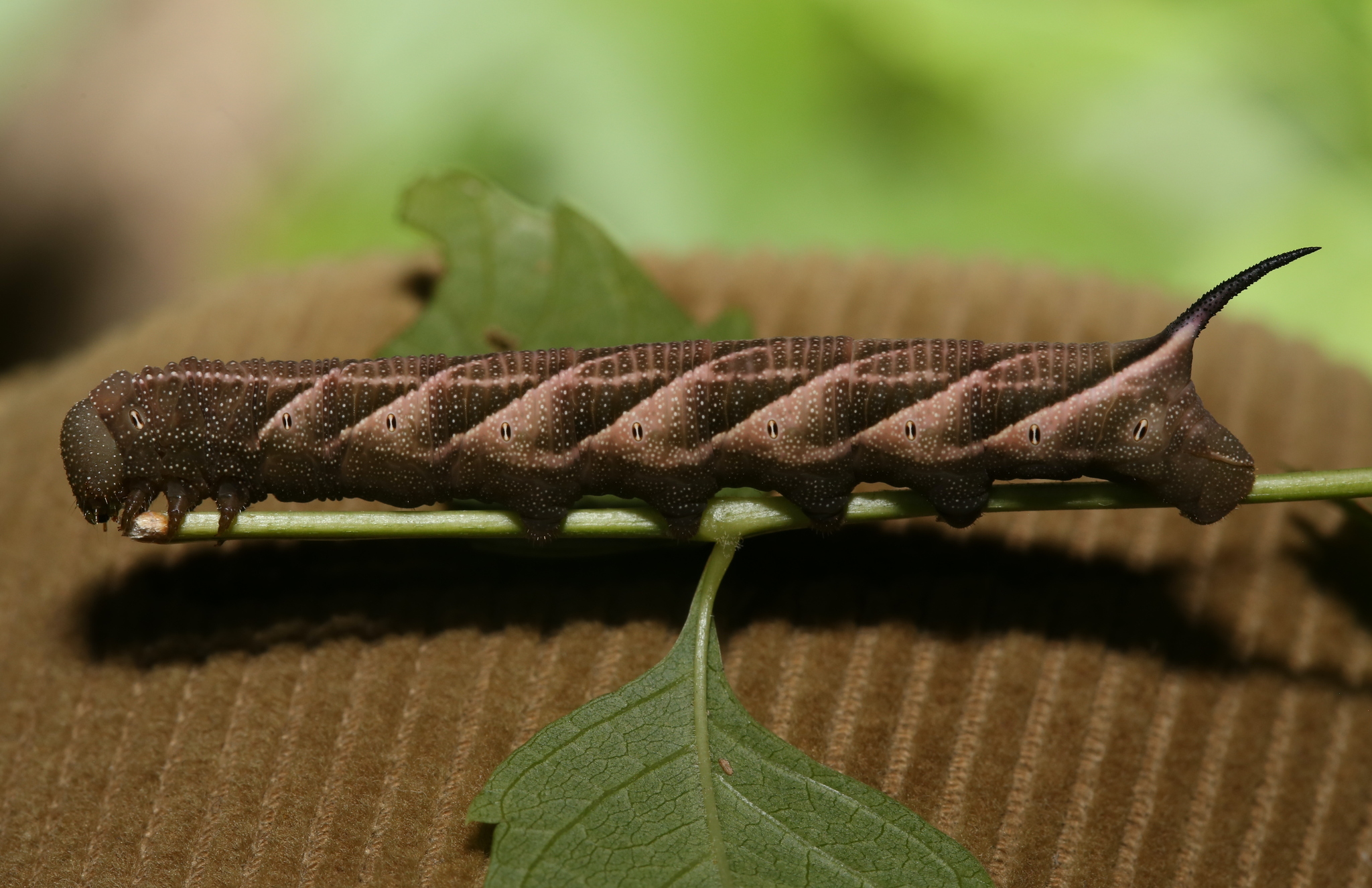
- Larva feeding on Campsis radicans

Scientific classification
- Kingdom: Animalia
- Phylum: Arthropoda
- Class: Insecta
- Order: Lepidoptera
- Family: Sphingidae
- Tribe: Sphingini
- Genus: Paratrea; Grote, 1903
- Species: P. plebeja

Binomial name
- Paratrea plebeja (Fabricius, 1777)

Synonyms
- Generic; Atreides Holland, 1903; Atreus Grote, 1886; Specific; Sphinx plebeja Fabricius, 1777

= Paratrea =

Plebeian sphinx

Genus of moths

Paratrea is a monotypic moth genus in the family Sphingidae erected by Augustus Radcliffe Grote in 1903. Its sole species, Paratrea plebeja, commonly known as the plebeian sphinx moth, was first described by Johan Christian Fabricius in 1777. This species is found in the eastern part of the United States extending westward to Nebraska, Kansas, Oklahoma and eastern Texas.

The length of the forewing is measured 31–35 mm. In the northern regions, adults are active in two generations, flying from May to August. In the southern regions, there are at least two generations, with adults on the wing from late April to June and from August to October. In Florida, adults are active from April to November, and in Louisiana, they are seen from March to September. Adults feed on the nectar of various flowers, including Saponaria officinalis, Phlox, Petunia, Mirabilis, Lonicera, Hymenocallis occidentalis and Verbena.

The larvae feed on plants such as Campsis radicans, Tecoma stans, and introduced Tecomaria capensis.
