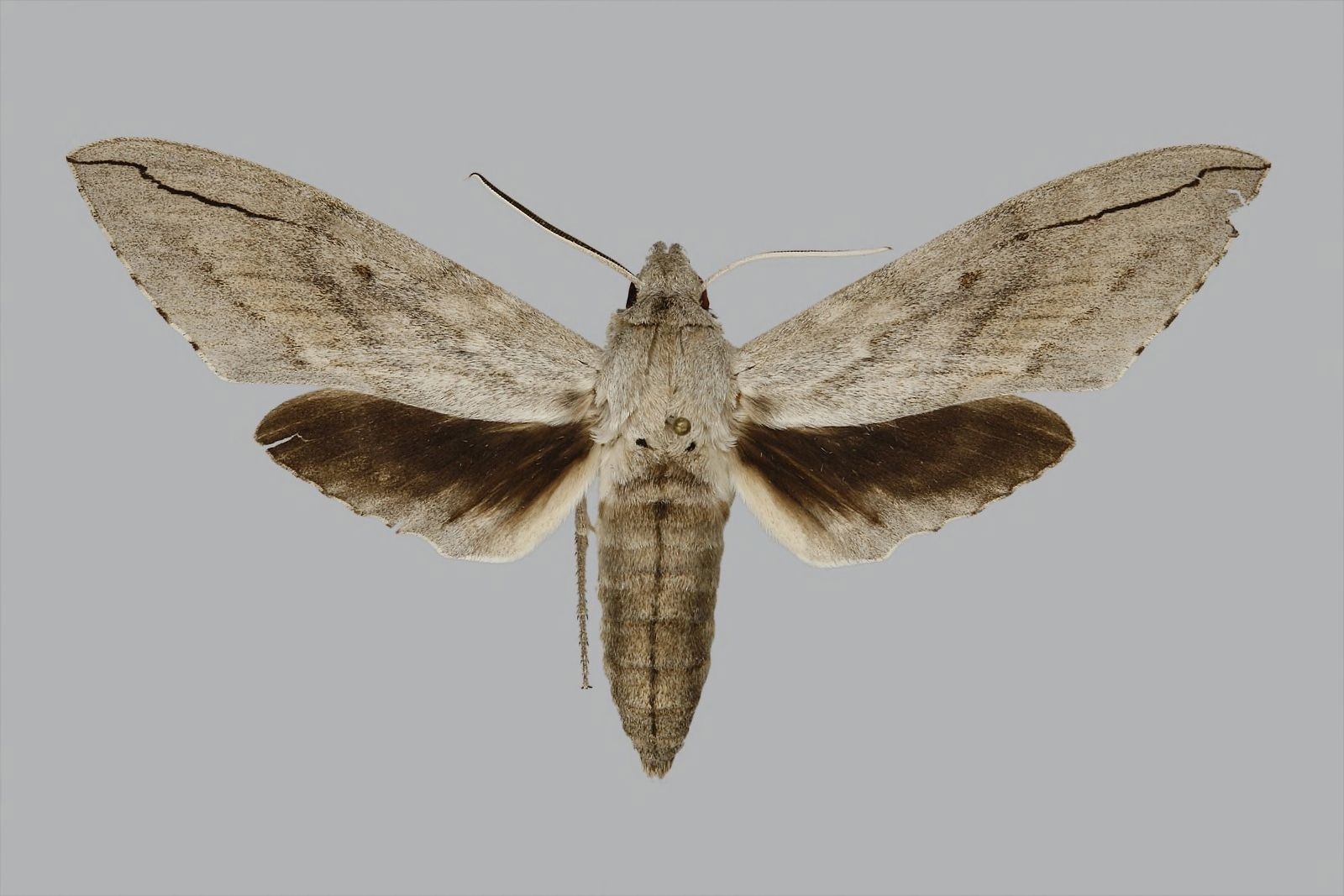

Scientific classification
- Domain: Eukaryota
- Kingdom: Animalia
- Phylum: Arthropoda
- Class: Insecta
- Order: Lepidoptera
- Family: Sphingidae
- Tribe: Sphingini
- Genus: Leucomonia; Rothschild & Jordan, 1903
- Species: L. bethia

Binomial name
- Leucomonia bethia (Kirby, 1877)

Synonyms
- Diludia bethia Kirby, 1877; Meganoton distinctum Rothschild, 1894

= Leucomonia =

Genus of moths

Leucomonia is a genus of moths in the family Sphingidae, containing only one species, Leucomonia bethia, which is known from New South Wales and Queensland.

The larvae have been recorded feeding on Clerodendrum floribundum.
