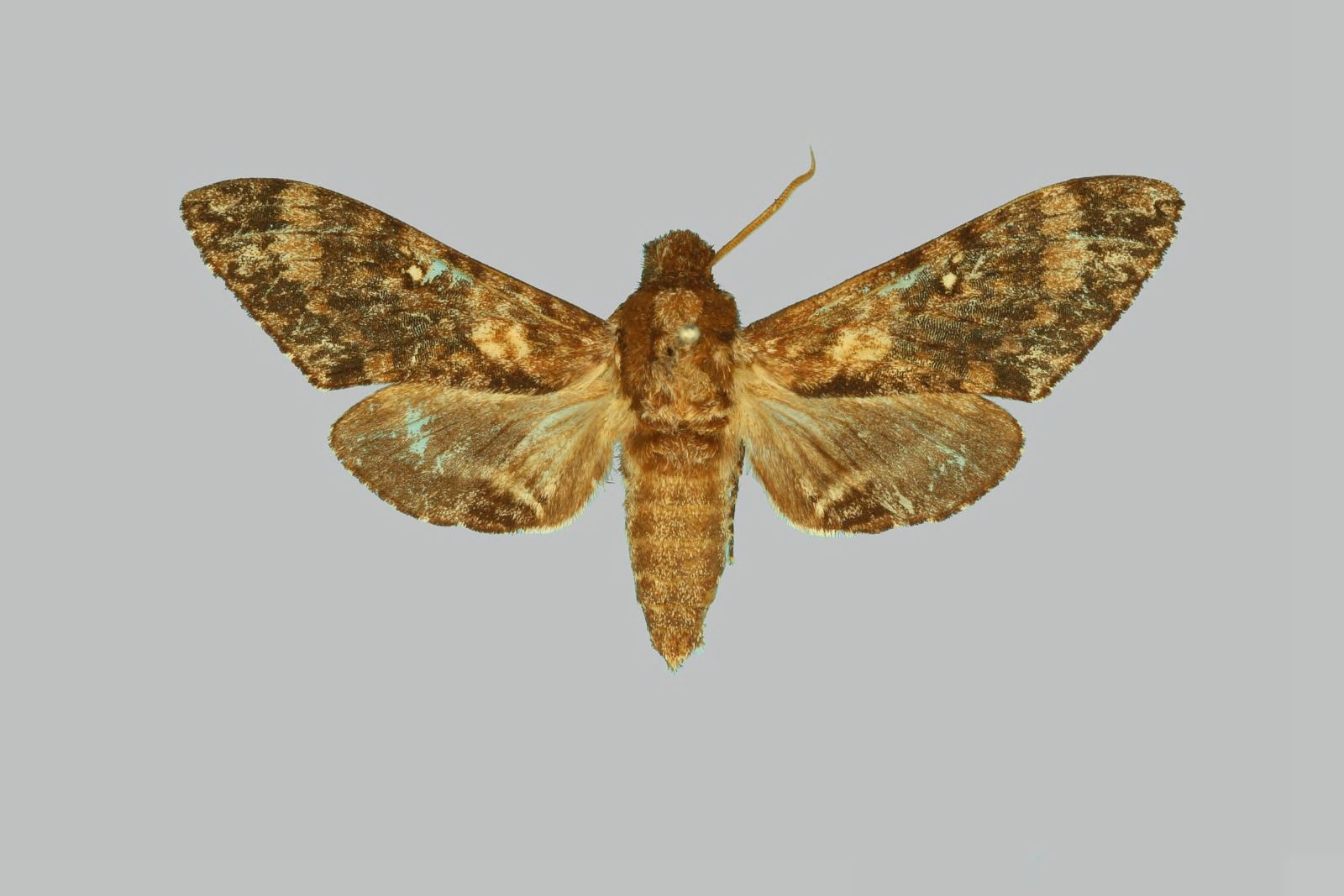
- Male

Scientific classification
- Domain: Eukaryota
- Kingdom: Animalia
- Phylum: Arthropoda
- Class: Insecta
- Order: Lepidoptera
- Family: Sphingidae
- Tribe: Sphingini
- Genus: Dolbogene; Rothschild & Jordan, 1903
- Species: D. hartwegii

Binomial name
- Dolbogene hartwegii (Butler, 1875)

Synonyms
- Dolba hartwegii Butler, 1875; Dolba clarki Hoffmann, 1924; Dolbogene manni Clark, 1917

= Dolbogene =

Hartweg's sphinx

Genus of moths

Dolbogene is a monotypic moth genus in the family Sphingidae erected by Walter Rothschild and Karl Jordan in 1903. Its only species, Dolbogene hartwegii, or Hartweg's sphinx, was first described by Arthur Gardiner Butler in 1875. It is found from Texas and southern Arizona to Mexico and Guatemala. Only a small number have been caught and not much is known about the biology of this species.

The wingspan is 54–61 mm. The upperside of the forewing is brown with dark brown and white markings and a light round spot. The upperside of the hindwing has a dark spot and the forewing has a small dark patch. Adults have been recorded in July and August.

== Sources ==
- James P. Tuttle: The Hawkmoths of North America, A Natural History Study of the Sphingidae of the United States and Canada, The Wedge Entomological Research Foundation, Washington, DC 2007, ISBN 978-0-9796633-0-7.
