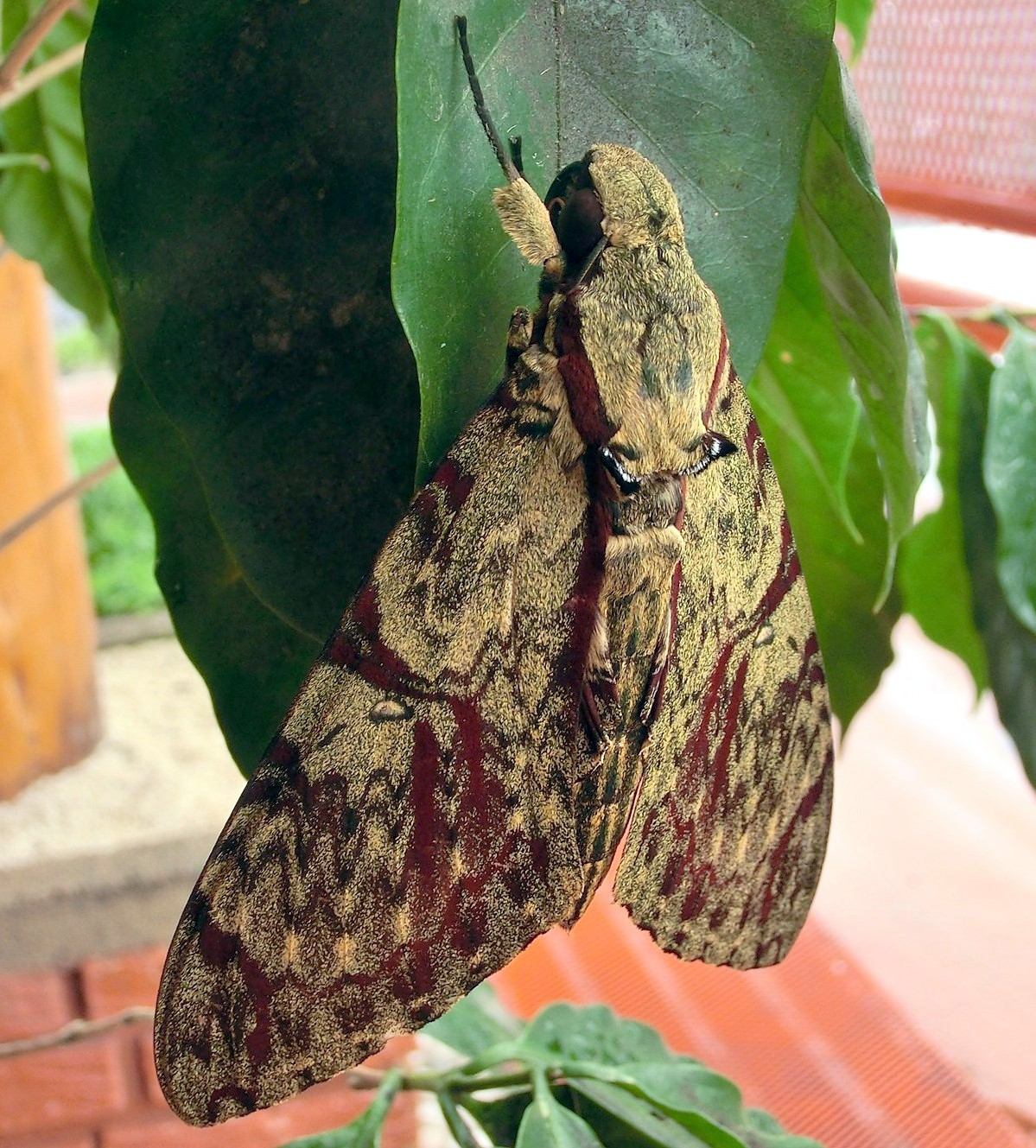

Scientific classification
- Kingdom: Animalia
- Phylum: Arthropoda
- Class: Insecta
- Order: Lepidoptera
- Family: Sphingidae
- Tribe: Sphingini
- Genus: Amphimoea; Rothschild & Jordan, 1903
- Species: A. walkeri

Binomial name
- Amphimoea walkeri (Boisduval, 1875)

Synonyms
- Amphonyx walkeri Boisduval, 1875; Amphonyx staudingeri H. Druce, 1888; Cocytius magnificus Rothschild, 1894; Cocytius misionum Köhler, 1924

= Amphimoea =

Genus of moths

Amphimoea is a monotypic moth genus in the family Sphingidae erected by Walter Rothschild and Karl Jordan in 1903. Its only species, Amphimoea walkeri, the Darwin hawkmoth, described by Jean Baptiste Boisduval in 1875, is found from Mexico south to Argentina.

== Description ==
The wingspan is 147–164 mm. Adults are on wing year round. They have the longest insect proboscis in the world and nectar from deep-throated flowers while hovering in the air.

== Biology ==
The larvae feed on Anaxagorea crassipetala.

== Gallery ==
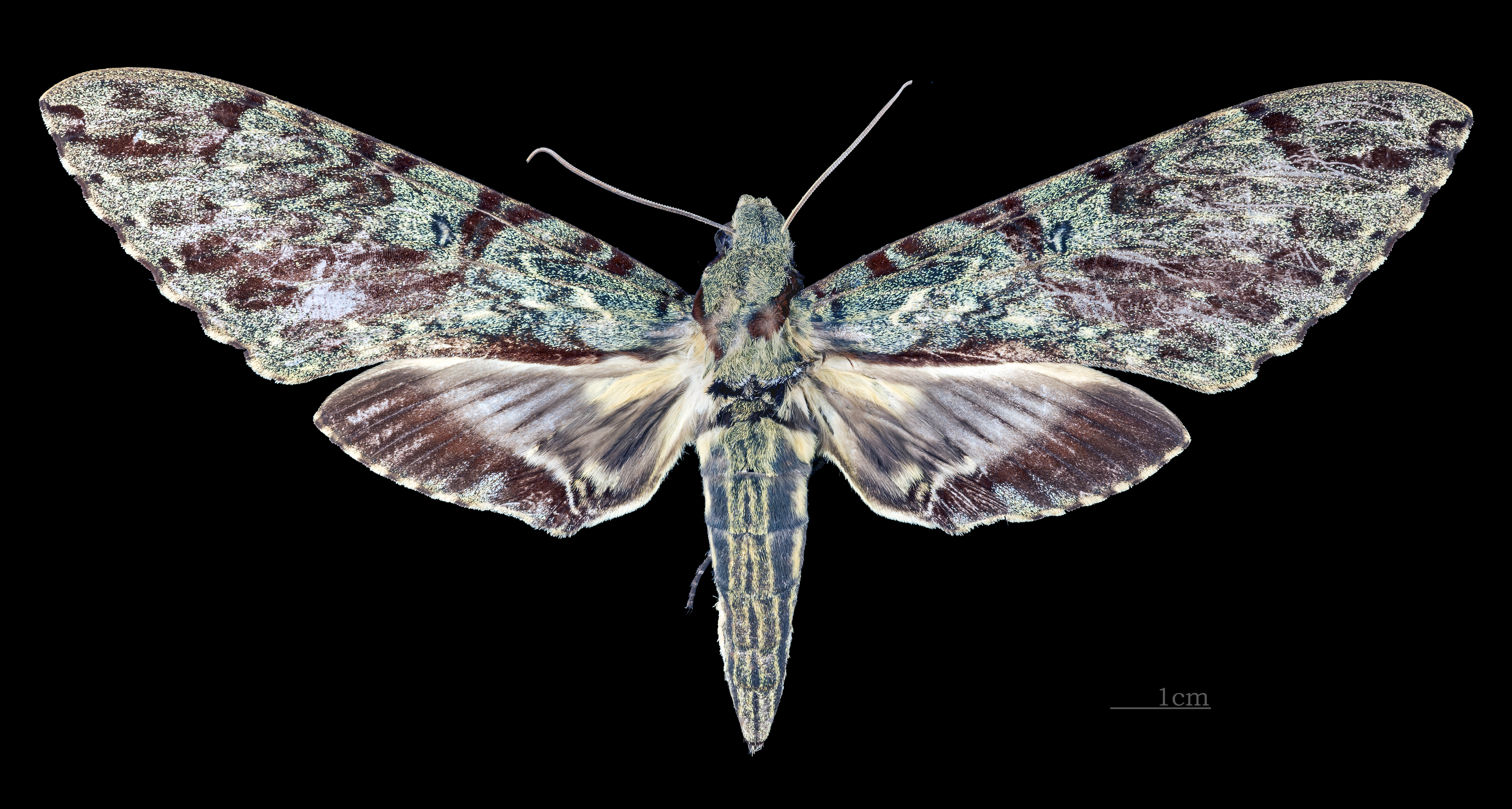
Female

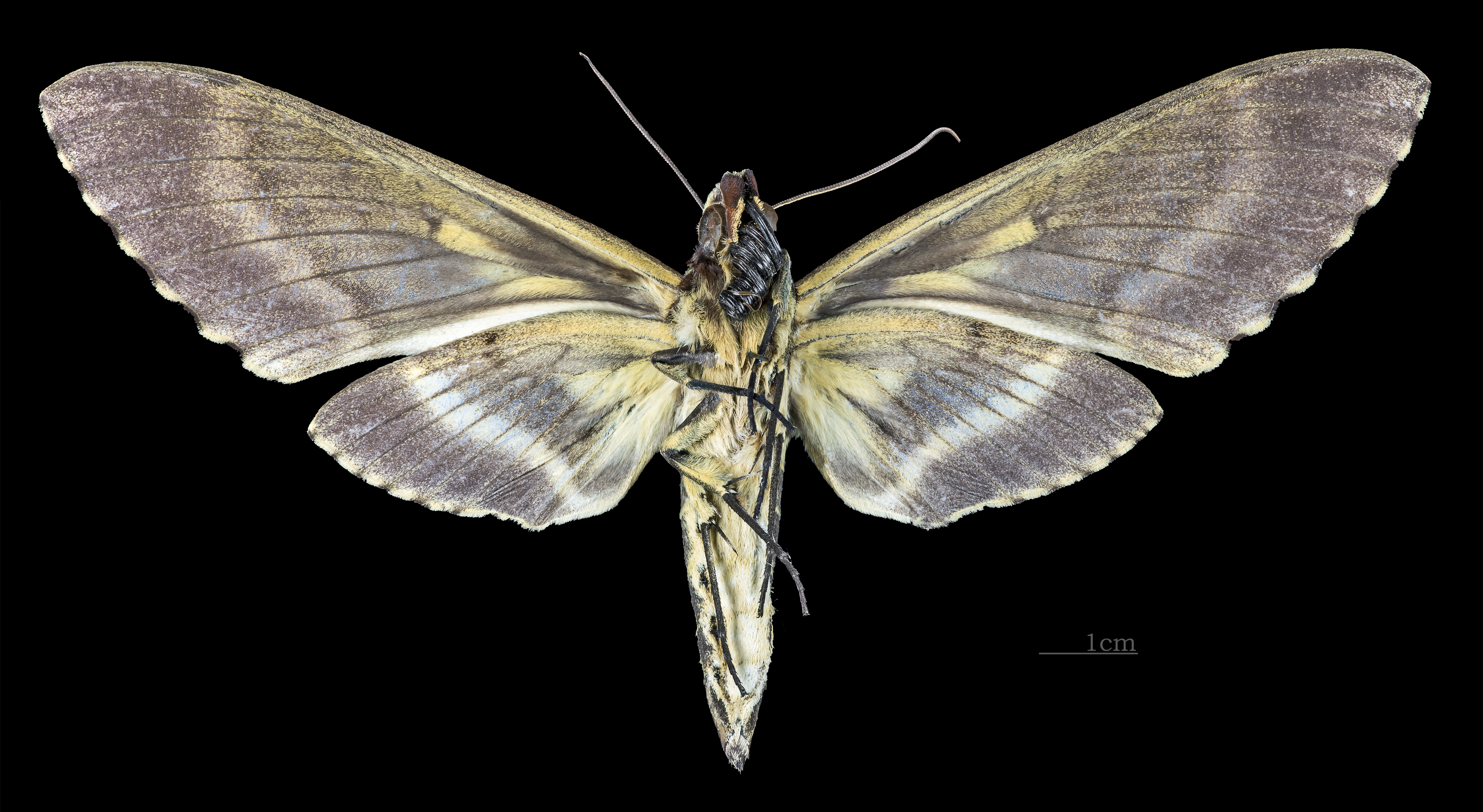
Female underside

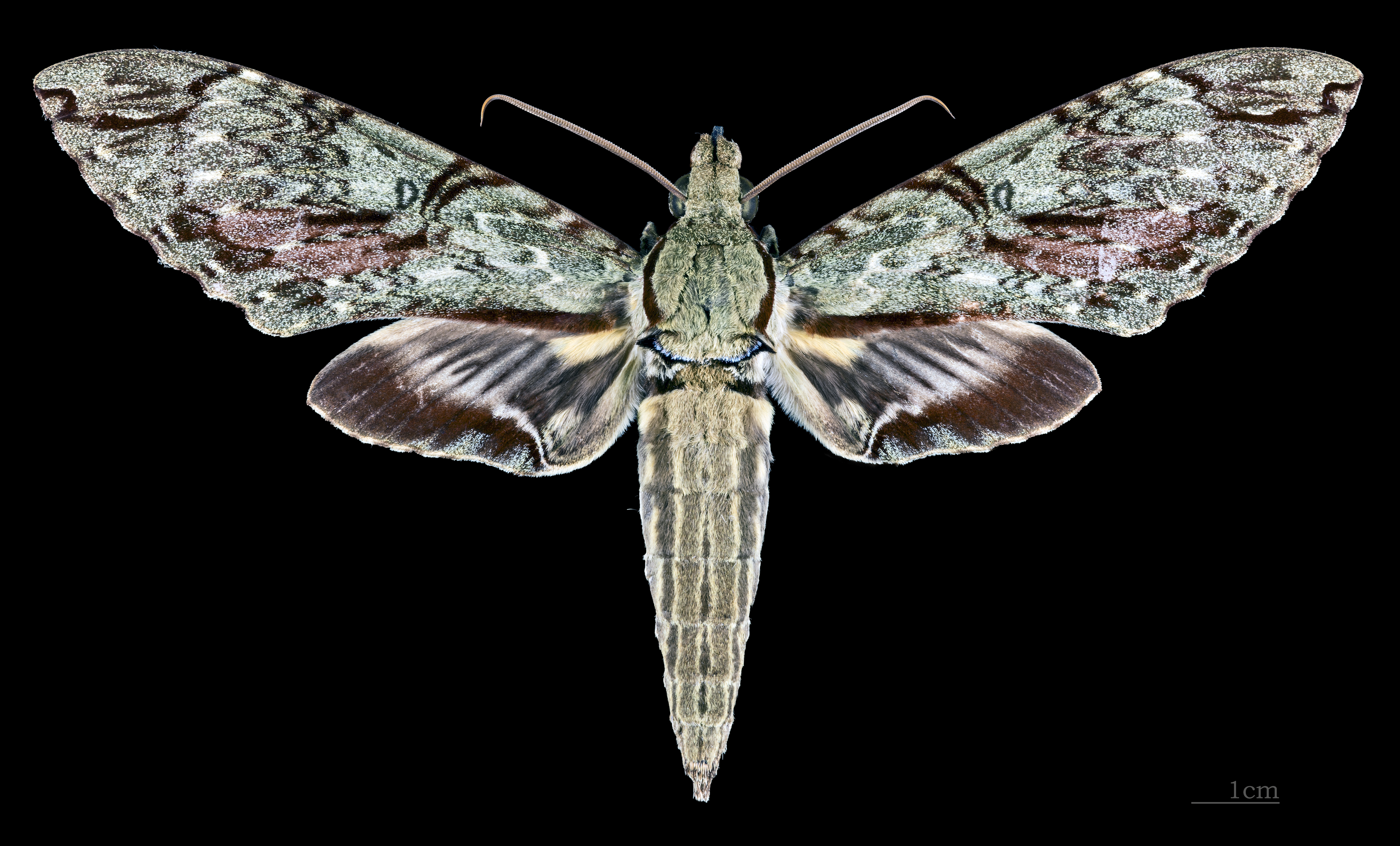
Male

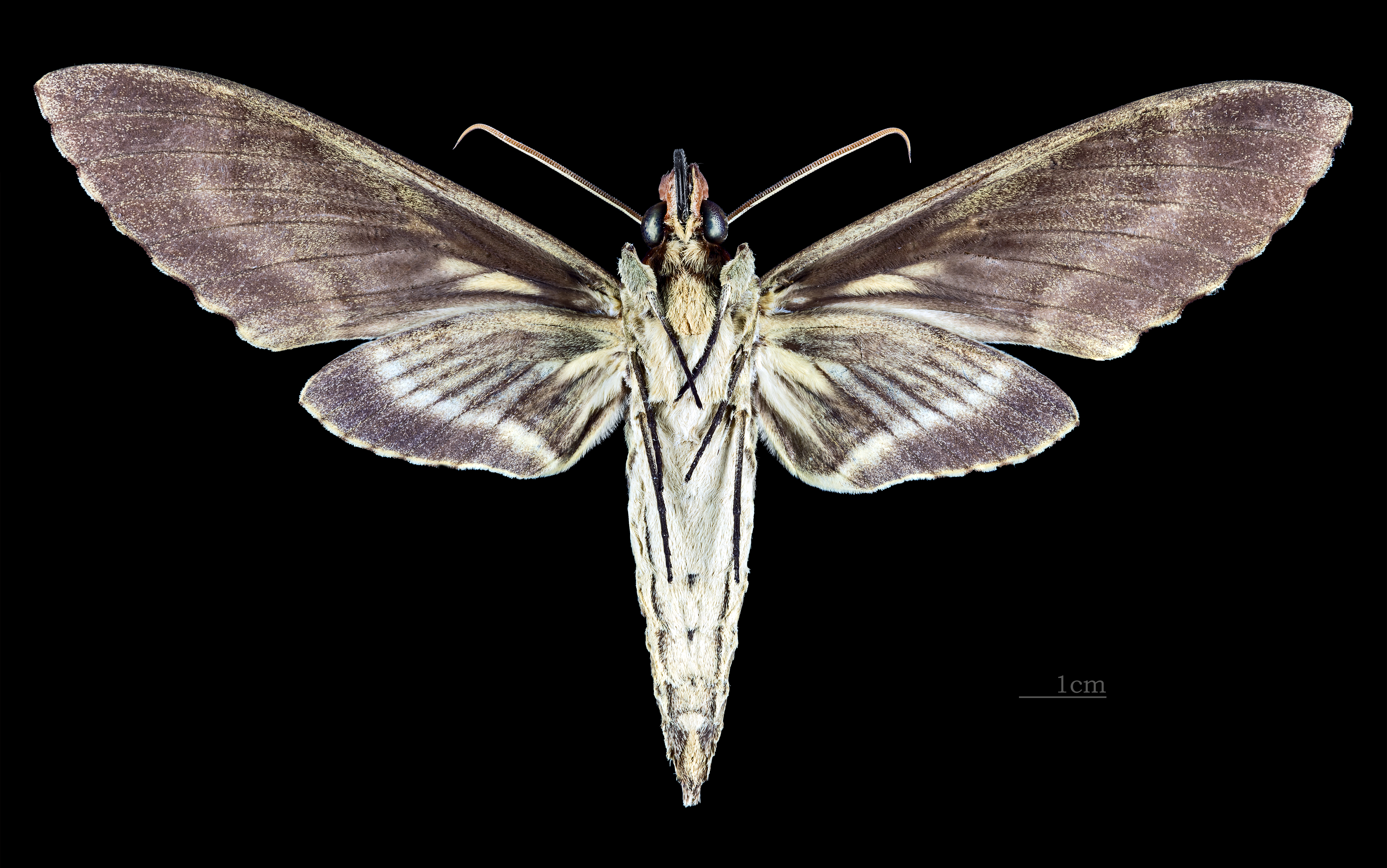
Male underside
