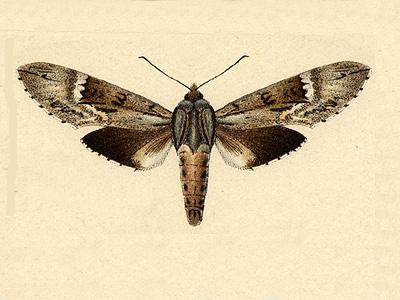

Scientific classification
- Domain: Eukaryota
- Kingdom: Animalia
- Phylum: Arthropoda
- Class: Insecta
- Order: Lepidoptera
- Family: Sphingidae
- Genus: Nannoparce
- Species: N. poeyi

Binomial name
- Nannoparce poeyi (Grote, 1865)

Synonyms
- Hyloicus poeyi Grote, 1865; Hyloicus poeyi haterius Druce, 1888

= Nannoparce poeyi =

Species of moth

Nannoparce poeyi is a moth of the family Sphingidae. It is known from Mexico, Cuba, Jamaica and the Dominican Republic.

== Subspecies ==
- Nannoparce poeyi poeyi (Cuba and the Dominican Republic)
- Nannoparce poeyi haterius (Druce, 1888) (Mexico)
