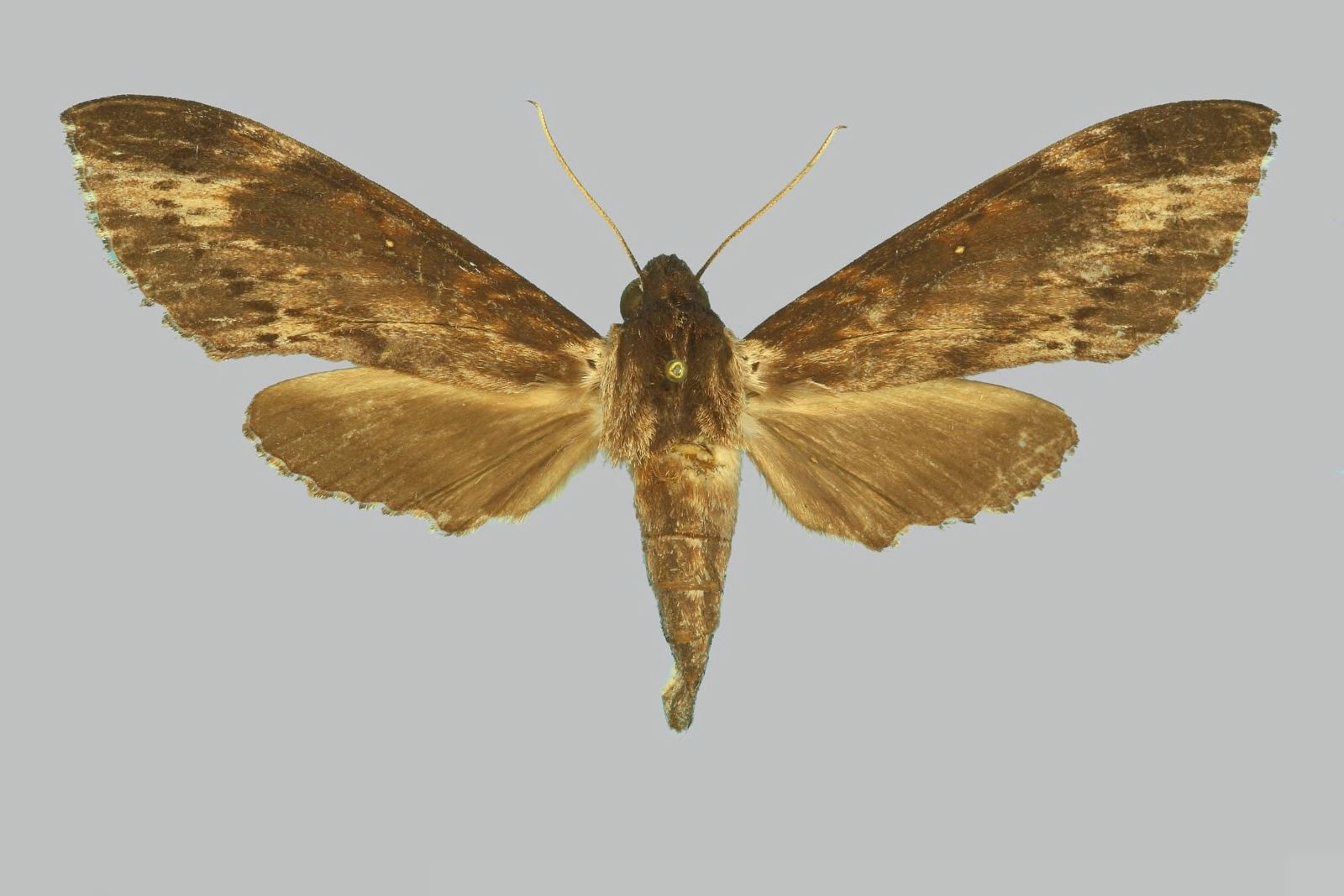

Scientific classification
- Domain: Eukaryota
- Kingdom: Animalia
- Phylum: Arthropoda
- Class: Insecta
- Order: Lepidoptera
- Family: Sphingidae
- Tribe: Sphingini
- Genus: Lomocyma; Rothschild & Jordan, 1903
- Species: L. oegrapha

Binomial name
- Lomocyma oegrapha (Mabille, 1884)

Synonyms
- Sphinx oegrapha Mabille, 1884

= Lomocyma =

Genus of moths

Lomocyma is a monotypic moth genus in the family Sphingidae erected by Walter Rothschild and Karl Jordan in 1903. Its only species, Lomocyma oegrapha, first described by Paul Mabille in 1884, lives in Madagascar.
