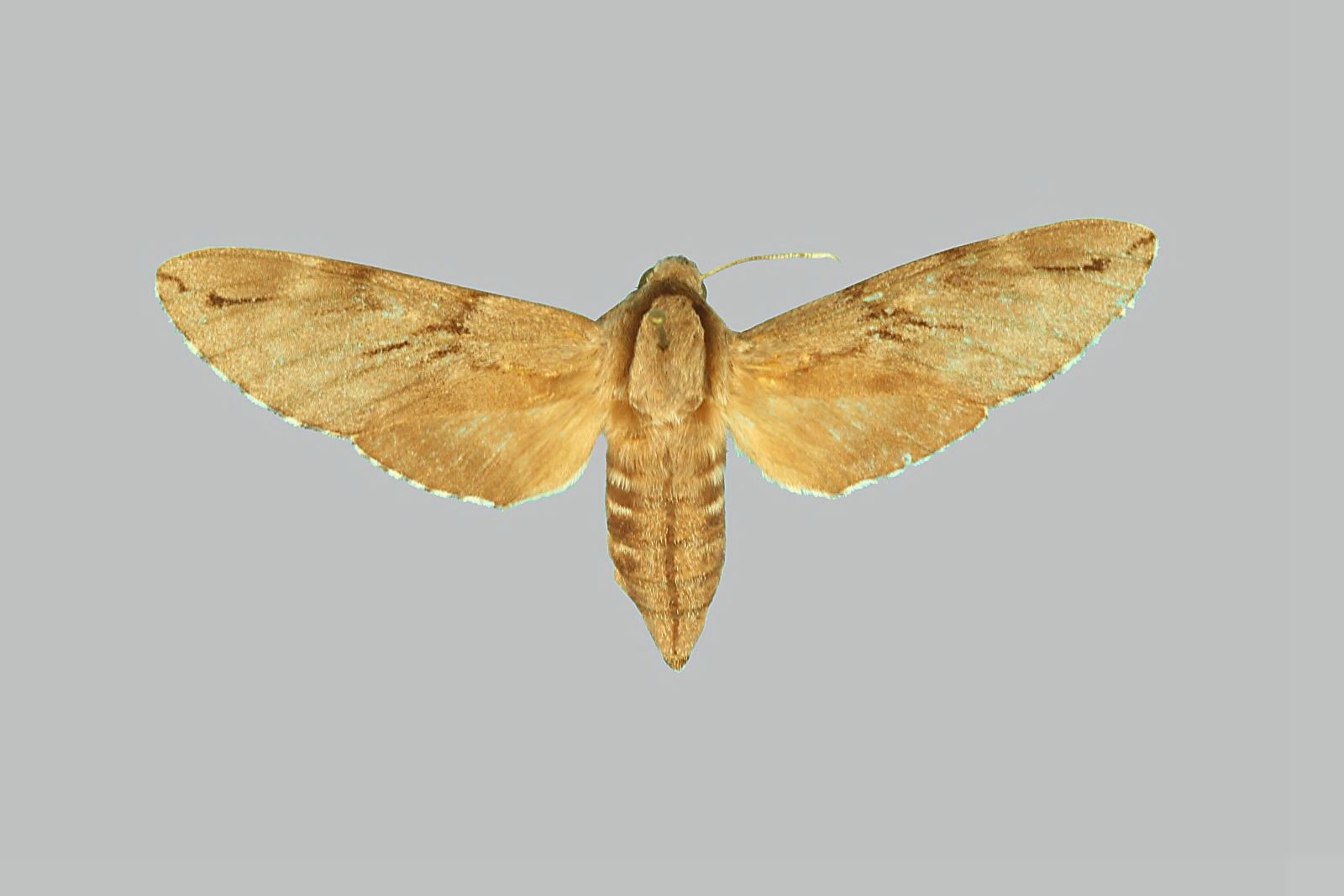

Scientific classification
- Domain: Eukaryota
- Kingdom: Animalia
- Phylum: Arthropoda
- Class: Insecta
- Order: Lepidoptera
- Family: Sphingidae
- Genus: Sphinx
- Species: S. caligineus

Binomial name
- Sphinx caligineus (Butler, 1877)

Synonyms
- Hyloicus caligineus Butler, 1877; Hyloicus caligineus sinicus Rothschild & Jordan, 1903

= Sphinx caligineus =

Species of moth

Sphinx caligineus, the Chinese pine hawkmoth, is a moth of the family Sphingidae. It is known from Japan, north-eastern, eastern, central and southern China, South Korea, northern Thailand and southern Vietnam.

The wingspan is 55–76 mm.

The larvae feed on Pinus tabulaeformis to the west and north of Beijing, as well as the ornamental Pinus armandii. In Guangdong, larvae have been recorded on Pinus massoniana. Other recorded food plants include Pinus elliottii and Pinus taeda.

== Subspecies ==
- Sphinx caligineus caligineus (Japan)
- Sphinx caligineus brunnescens Mell, 1922 (central and southern China)
- Sphinx caligineus sinicus (Rothschild & Jordan, 1903) (north-eastern, eastern and southern China, South Korea, northern Thailand and southern Vietnam)
