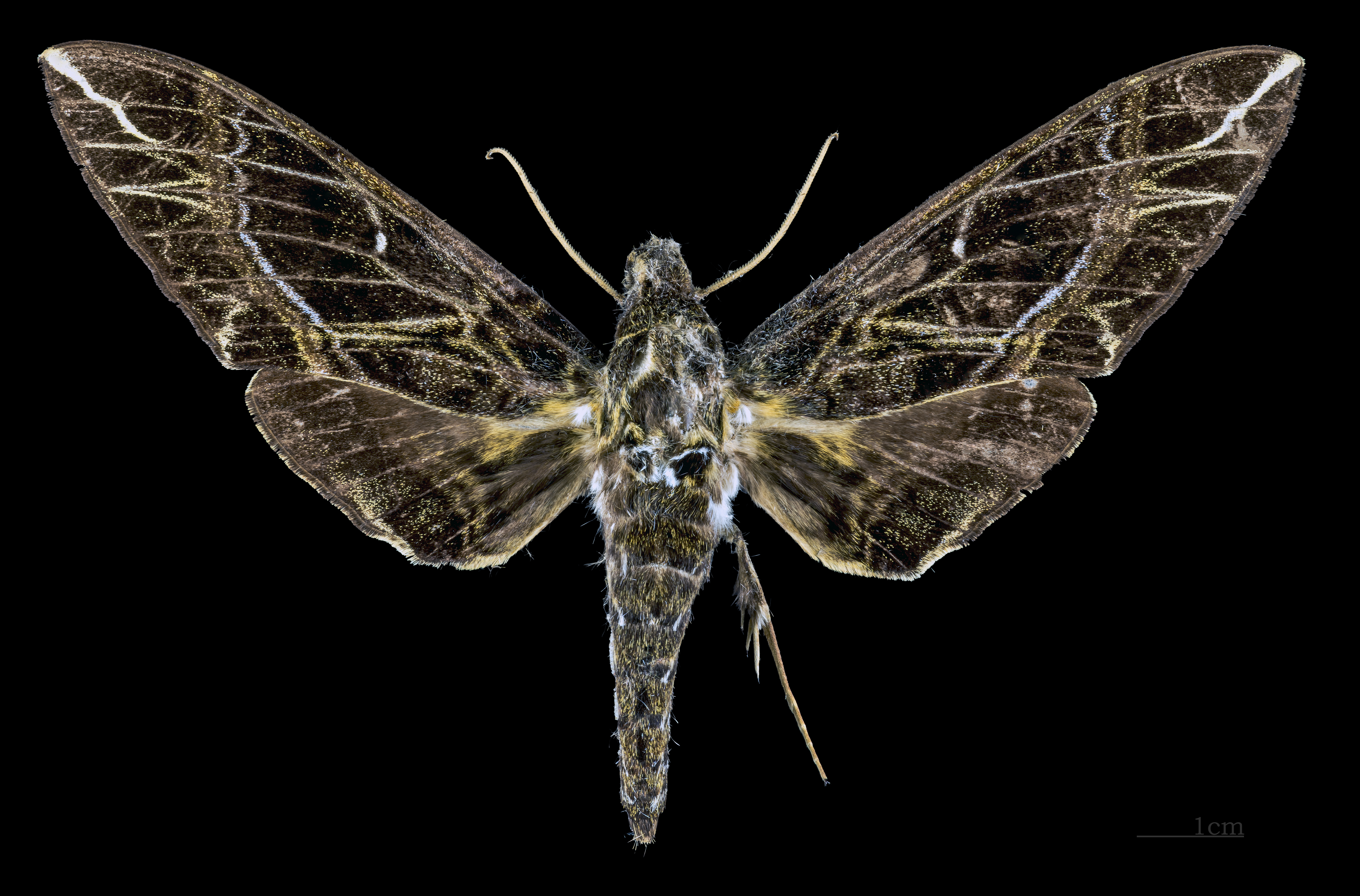
- Male dorsal view
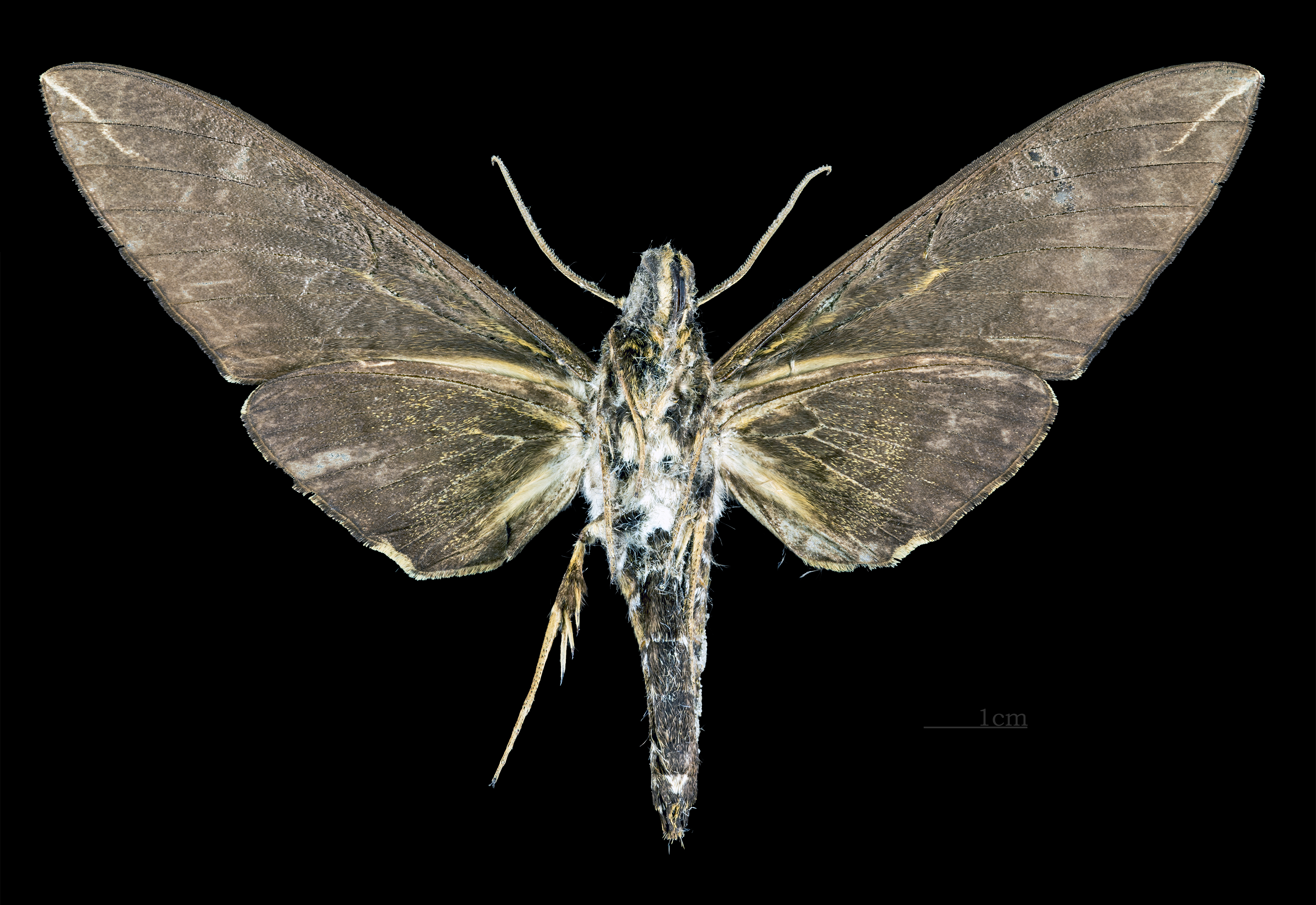
- Male ventral view

Scientific classification
- Kingdom: Animalia
- Phylum: Arthropoda
- Class: Insecta
- Order: Lepidoptera
- Family: Sphingidae
- Genus: Apocalypsis; Rothschild & Jordan, 1903
- Species: A. velox

Binomial name
- Apocalypsis velox (Butler, 1876)

= Apocalypsis velox =

Species of moth

Apocalypsis velox is the only species in the monotypic moth genus Apocalypsis in the family Sphingidae. The genus was erected by Walter Rothschild and Karl Jordan in 1903. The species was described by Arthur Gardiner Butler in 1876, and is found from north-eastern India and from south-western China to northern Vietnam.

== Description ==
The wingspan is about 136 mm. The forewing upperside pattern is similar to that of Euryglottis aper.

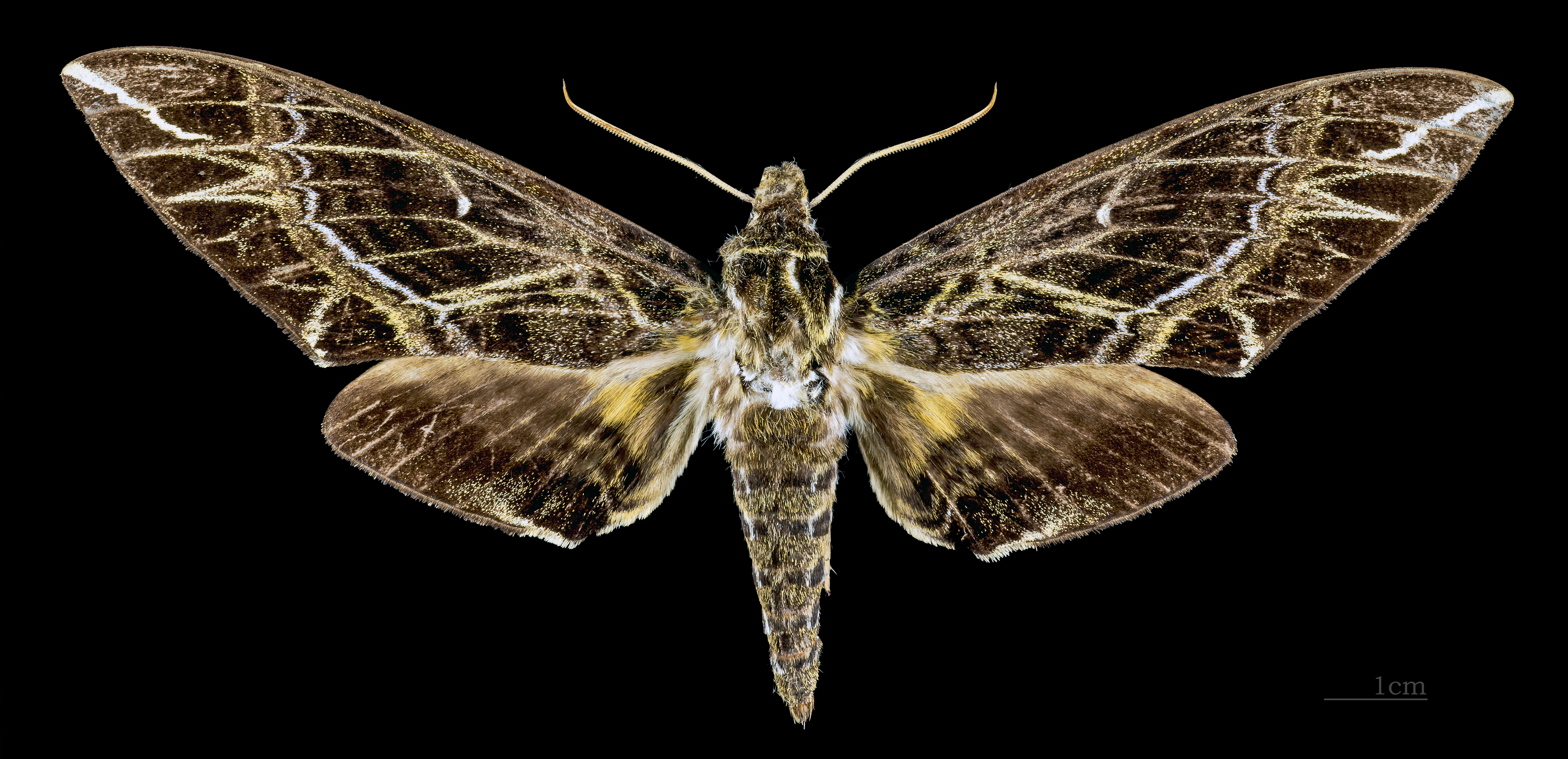
Female dorsal view

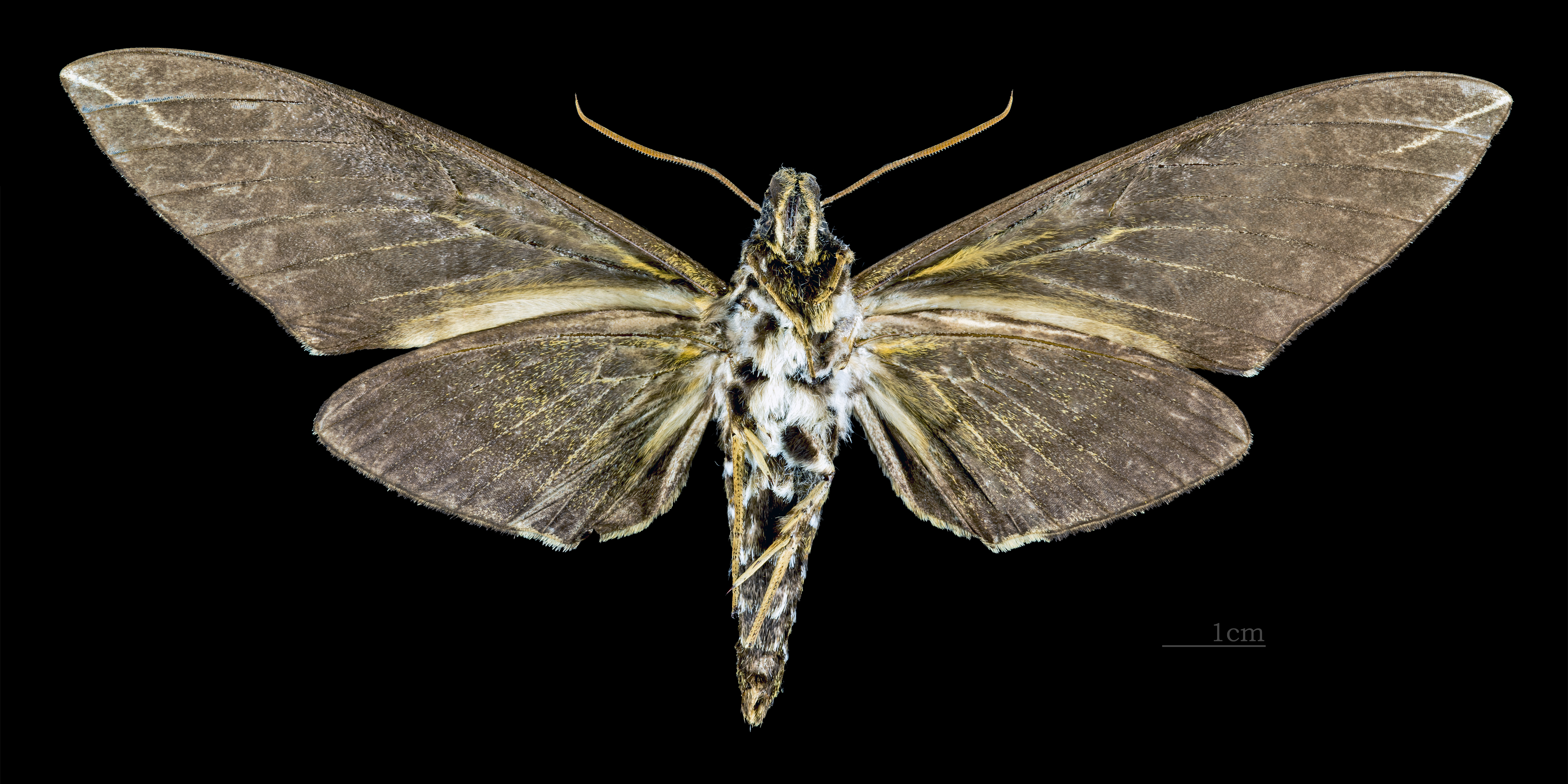
Female ventral view

== Biology ==
The larvae have been recorded feeding on Callicarpa arborea in India.
