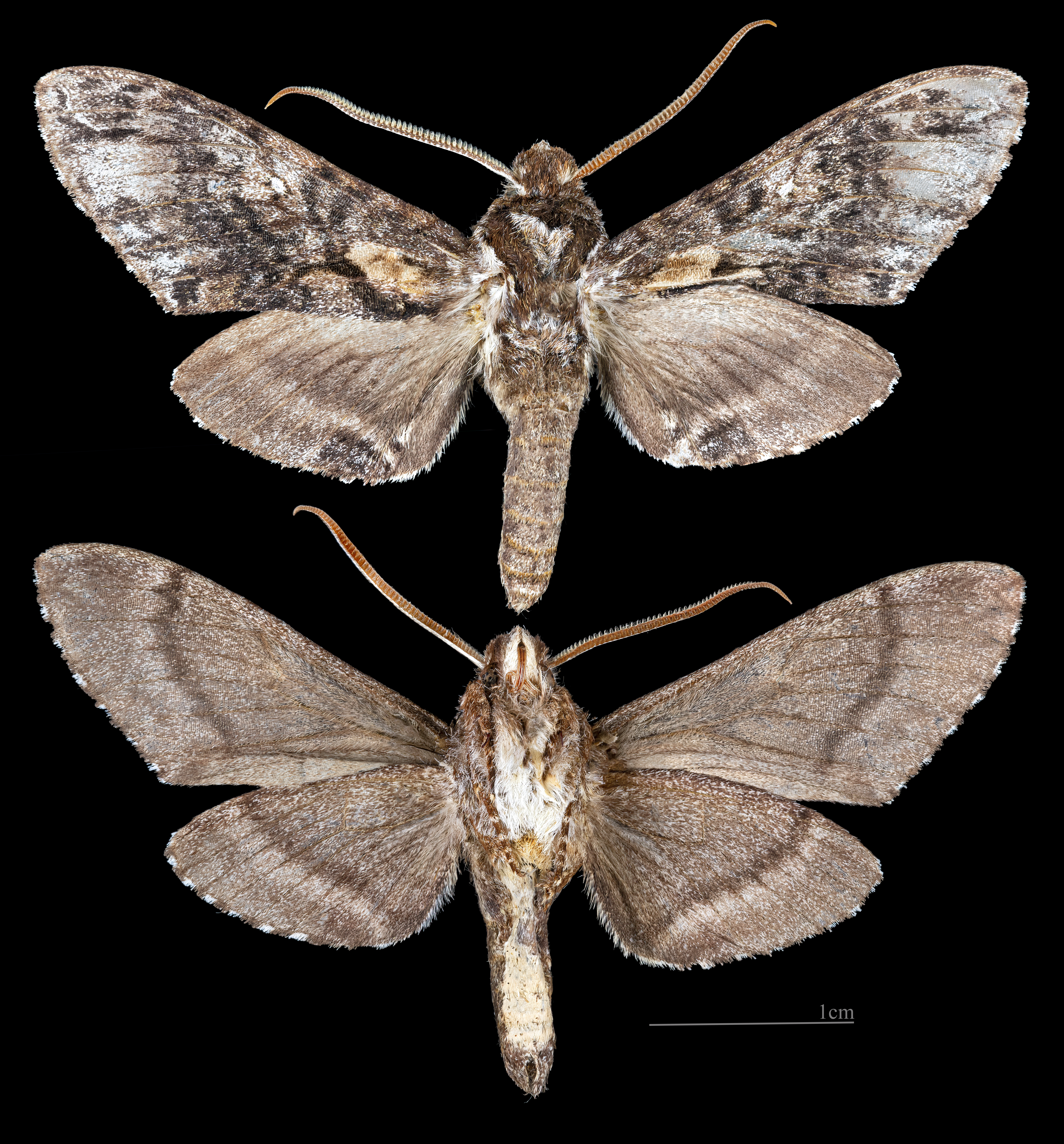

Scientific classification
- Domain: Eukaryota
- Kingdom: Animalia
- Phylum: Arthropoda
- Class: Insecta
- Order: Lepidoptera
- Family: Sphingidae
- Genus: Nannoparce
- Species: N. balsa

Binomial name
- Nannoparce balsa Schaus, 1932

= Nannoparce balsa =

Species of moth

Nannoparce balsa is a moth of the family Sphingidae. It is known from Mexico.
