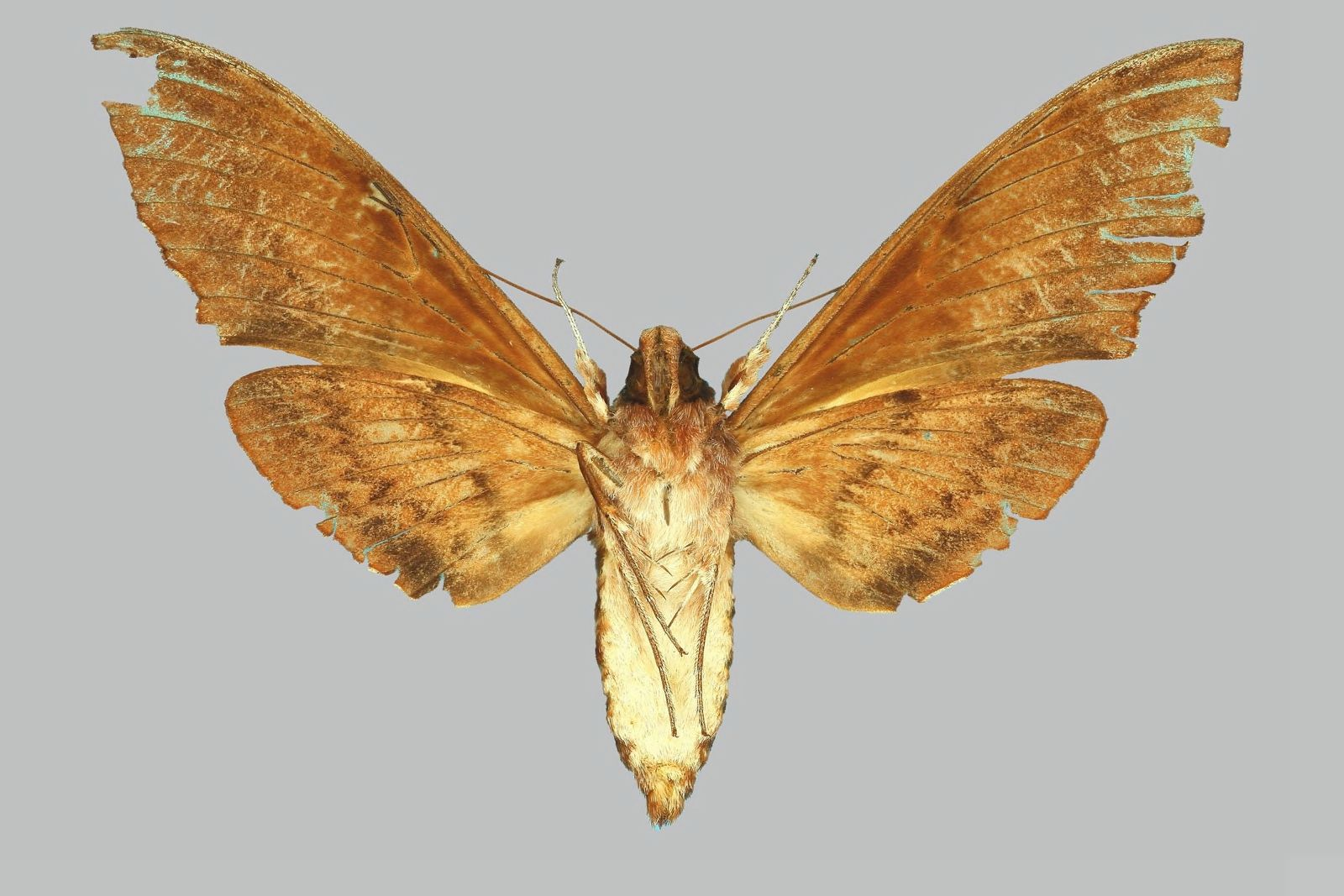
- Meganoton hyloicoides

Scientific classification
- Domain: Eukaryota
- Kingdom: Animalia
- Phylum: Arthropoda
- Class: Insecta
- Order: Lepidoptera
- Family: Sphingidae
- Genus: Meganoton
- Species: M. hyloicoides

Binomial name
- Meganoton hyloicoides Rothschild, 1910

= Meganoton hyloicoides =

Meganoton Hyloicoides

Species of moth

Meganoton hyloicoides is a rather rare moth of the family Sphingidae. It is only found in Papua New Guinea.
