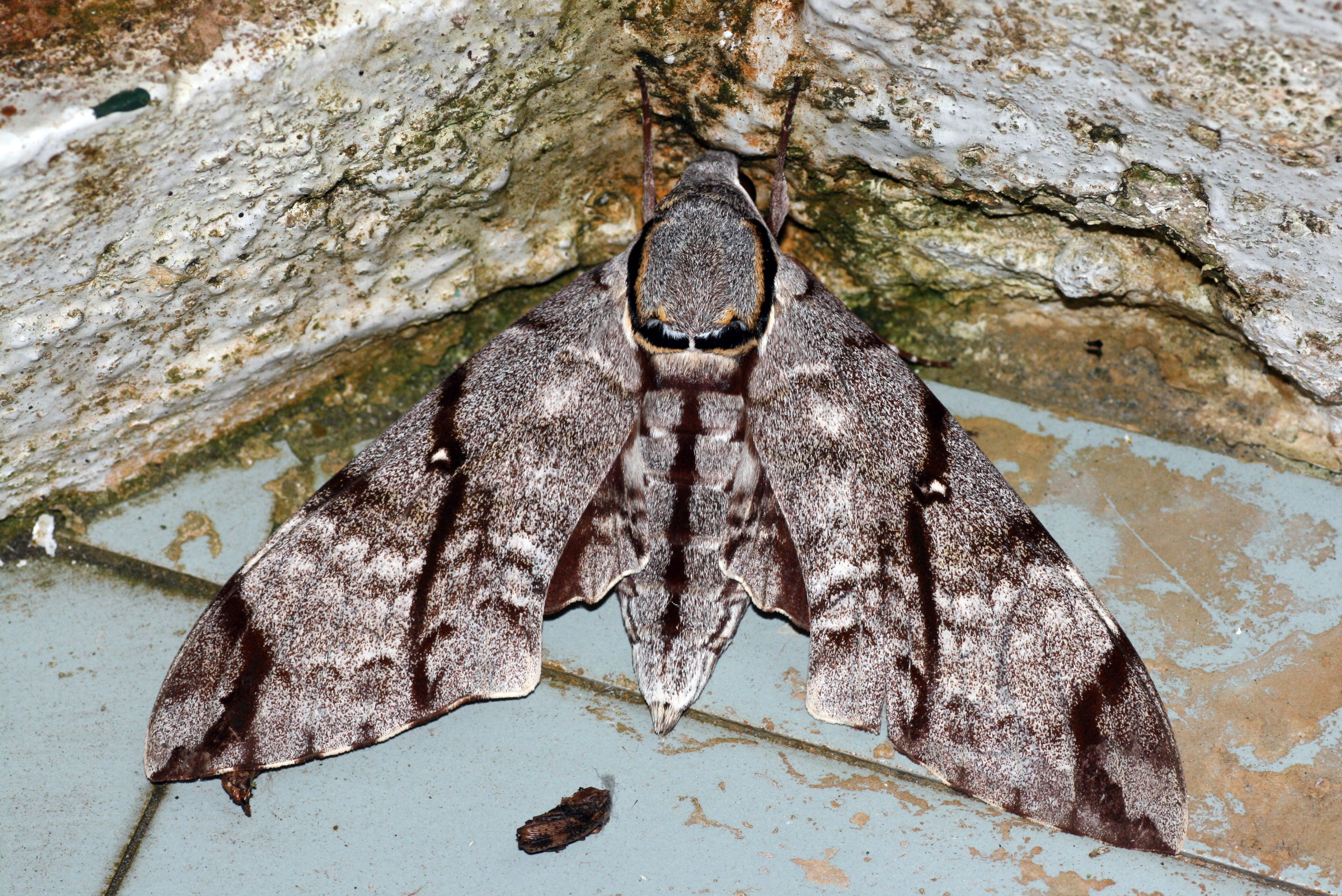

Scientific classification
- Domain: Eukaryota
- Kingdom: Animalia
- Phylum: Arthropoda
- Class: Insecta
- Order: Lepidoptera
- Family: Sphingidae
- Genus: Meganoton
- Species: M. analis

Binomial name
- Meganoton analis (R. Felder, 1874)

Synonyms
- Sphinx analis R. Felder, 1874; Diludia grandis Butler, 1875; Diludia tranquillaris Butler, 1876; Meganoton clossi Gehlen, 1924; Meganoton analis subalba Mell, 1922; Psilogramma analis scribae Austaut, 1911

= Meganoton analis =

Species of moth

Meganoton analis, the grey double-bristled hawkmoth, is a moth of the family Sphingidae. It is known from India, Nepal, southern and eastern China, northern Thailand, northern Vietnam, Peninsular Malaysia, Indonesia, Taiwan, the southern part of the Russian Far East (Kurile Islands), South Korea and Japan.

== Description ==
The wingspan is 87–150 mm.

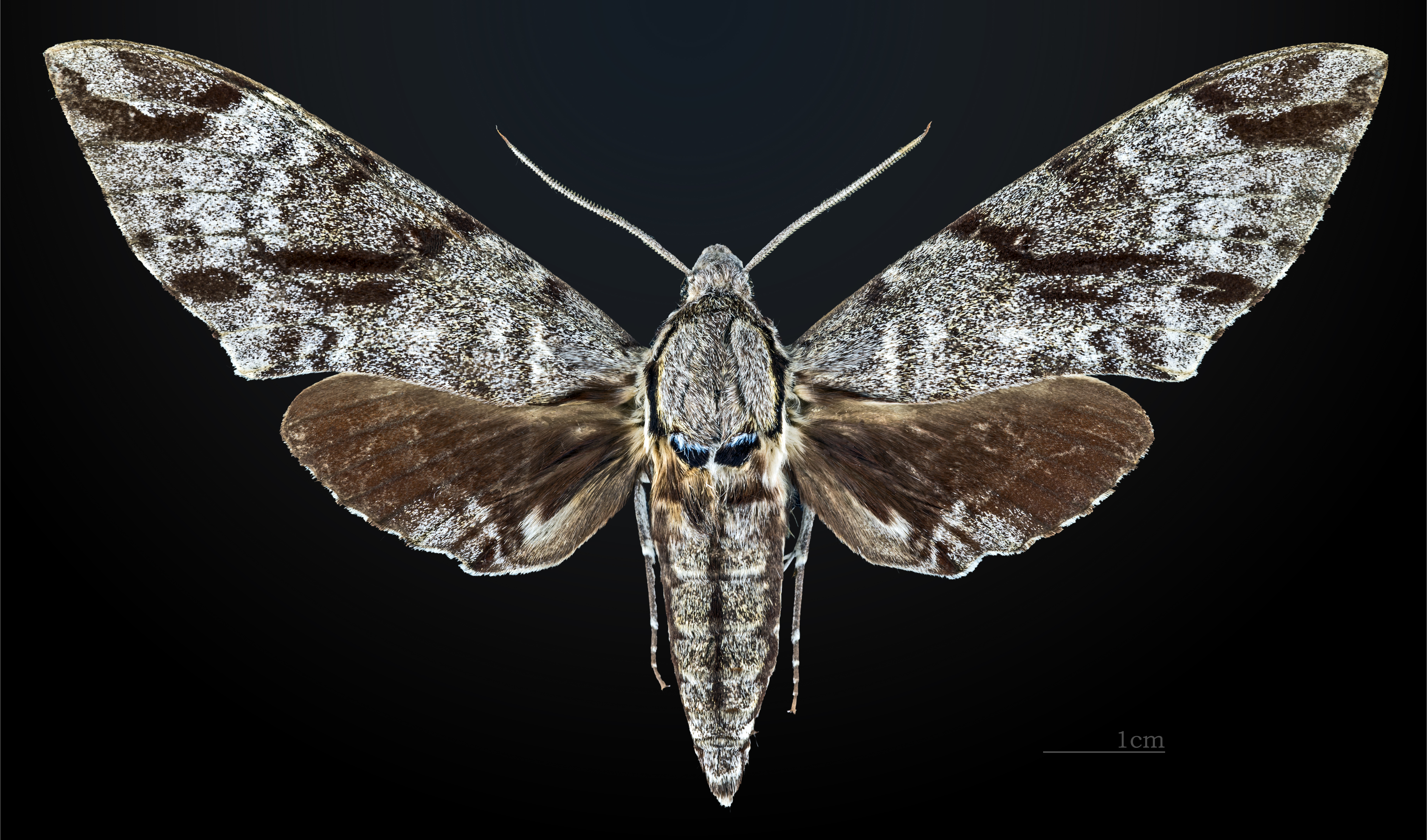
Male

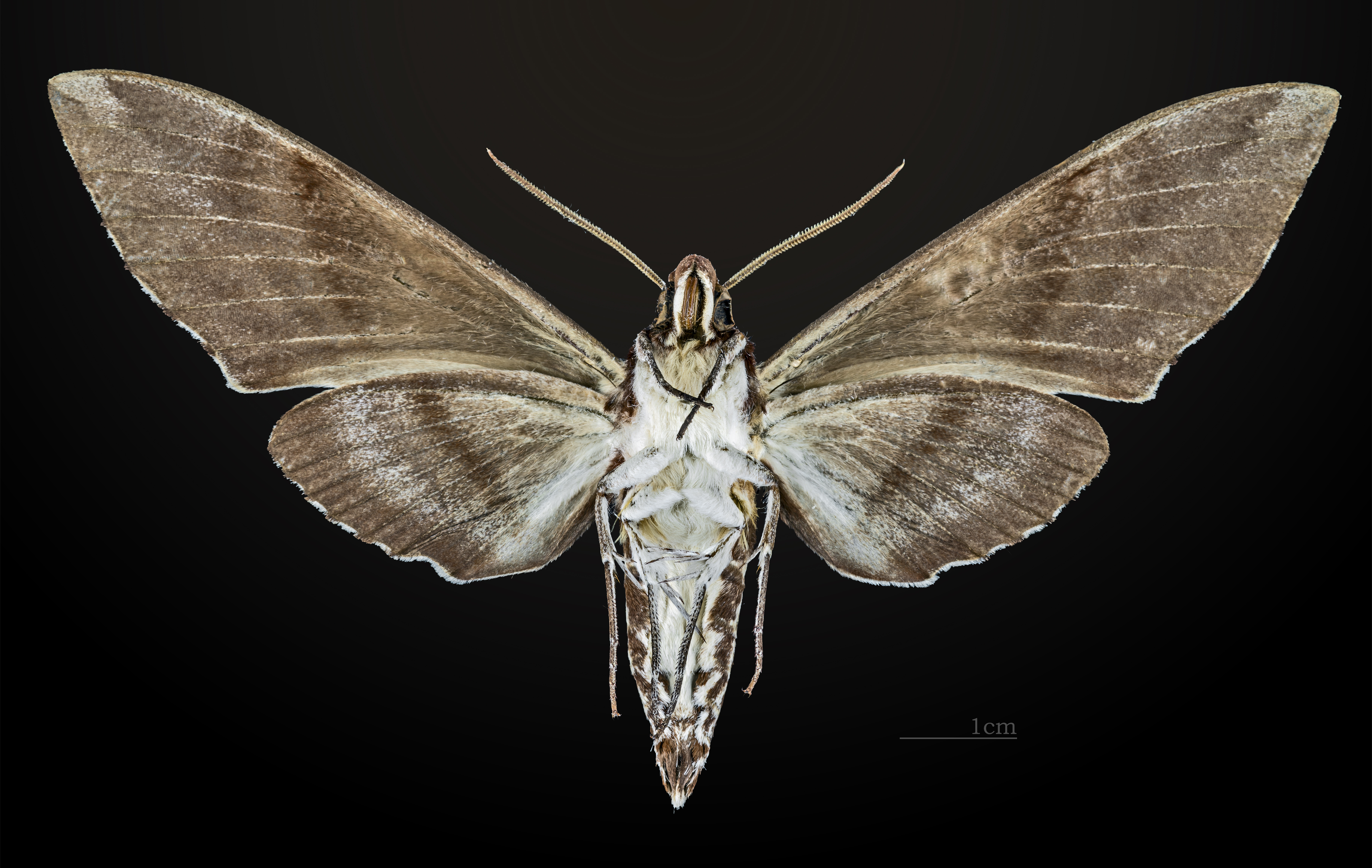
Male underside

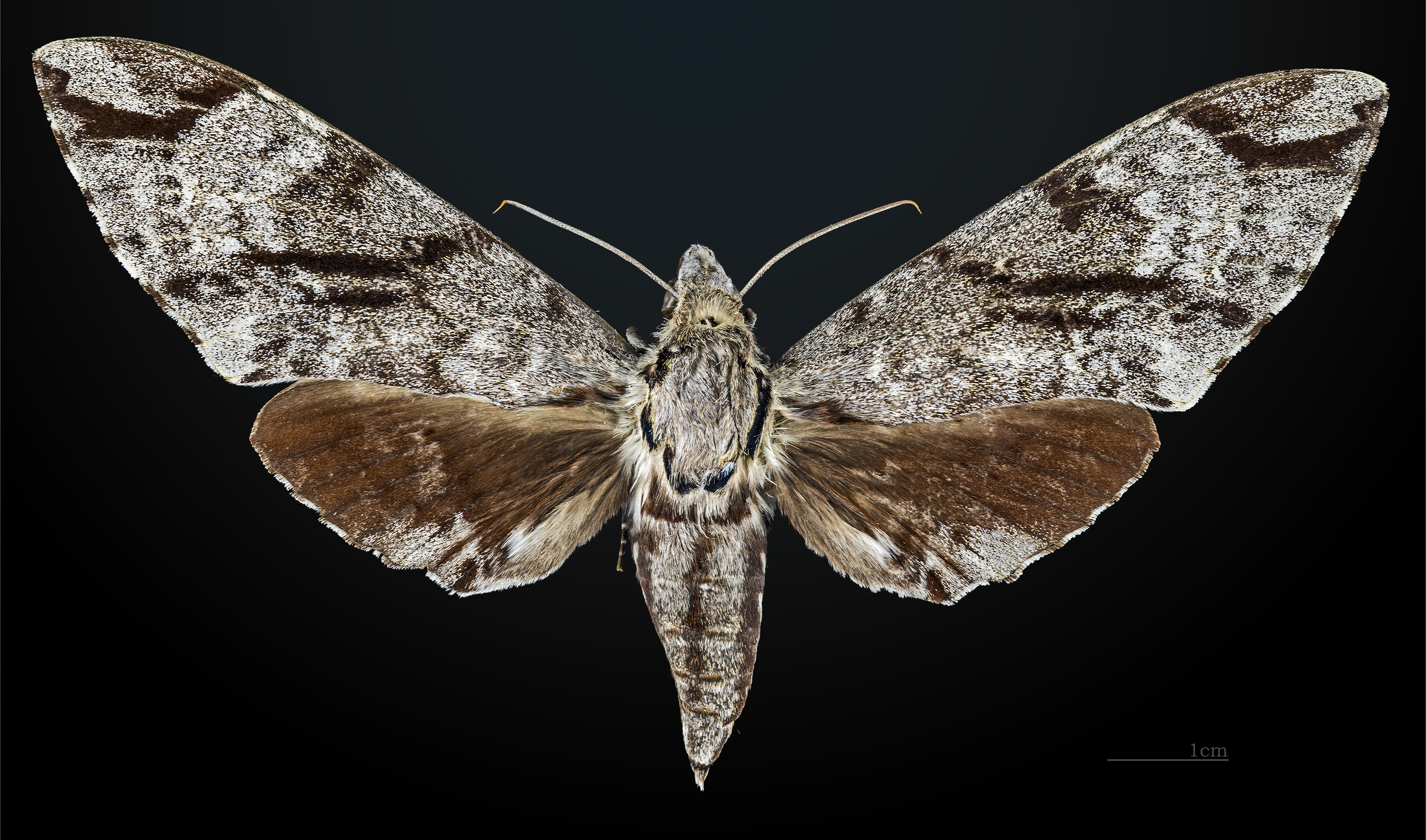
Female

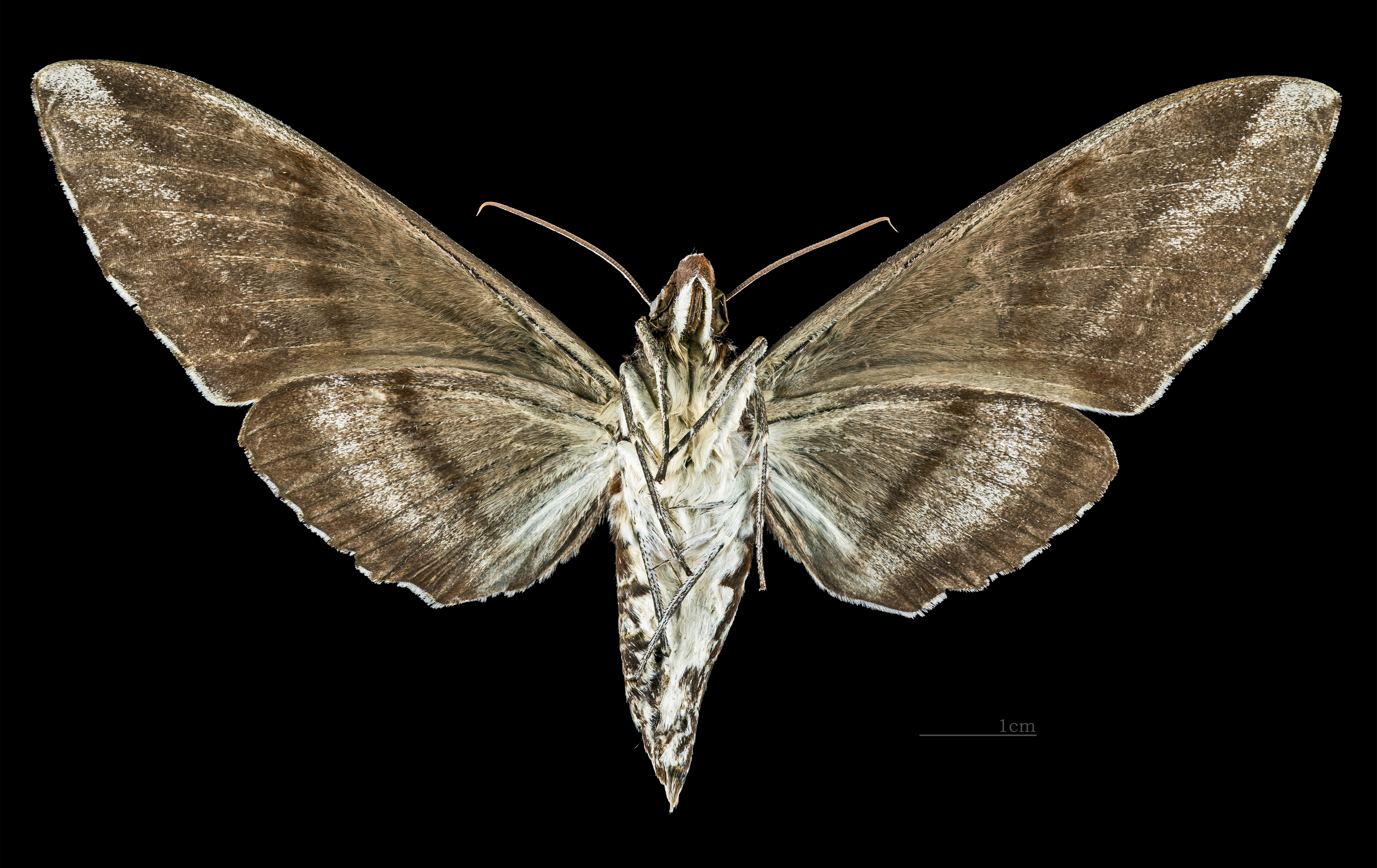
Female underside

== Biology ==
The adults of subspecies M. a. scribae are on wing from early June to early August in Korea.

The larvae have been recorded feeding on Sassafras tzuma in China. It is also an occasional pest of Magnolia species. The larvae of subspecies M. a. scribae have been recorded feeding on Magnolia kobus in Japan.

== Subspecies ==
- Meganoton analis analis (India, Nepal, southern China, northern Thailand and northern Vietnam)
- Meganoton analis gressitti Clark, 1937 (Taiwan)
- Meganoton analis scribae (Austaut, 1911) (southern Russian Far East (Kuril Islands), eastern China, South Korea and Japan)
- Meganoton analis sugii Cadiou & Holloway, 1989 (Sulawesi)
- Meganoton analis sumatranus Clark, 1924 (Borneo, Sumatra)
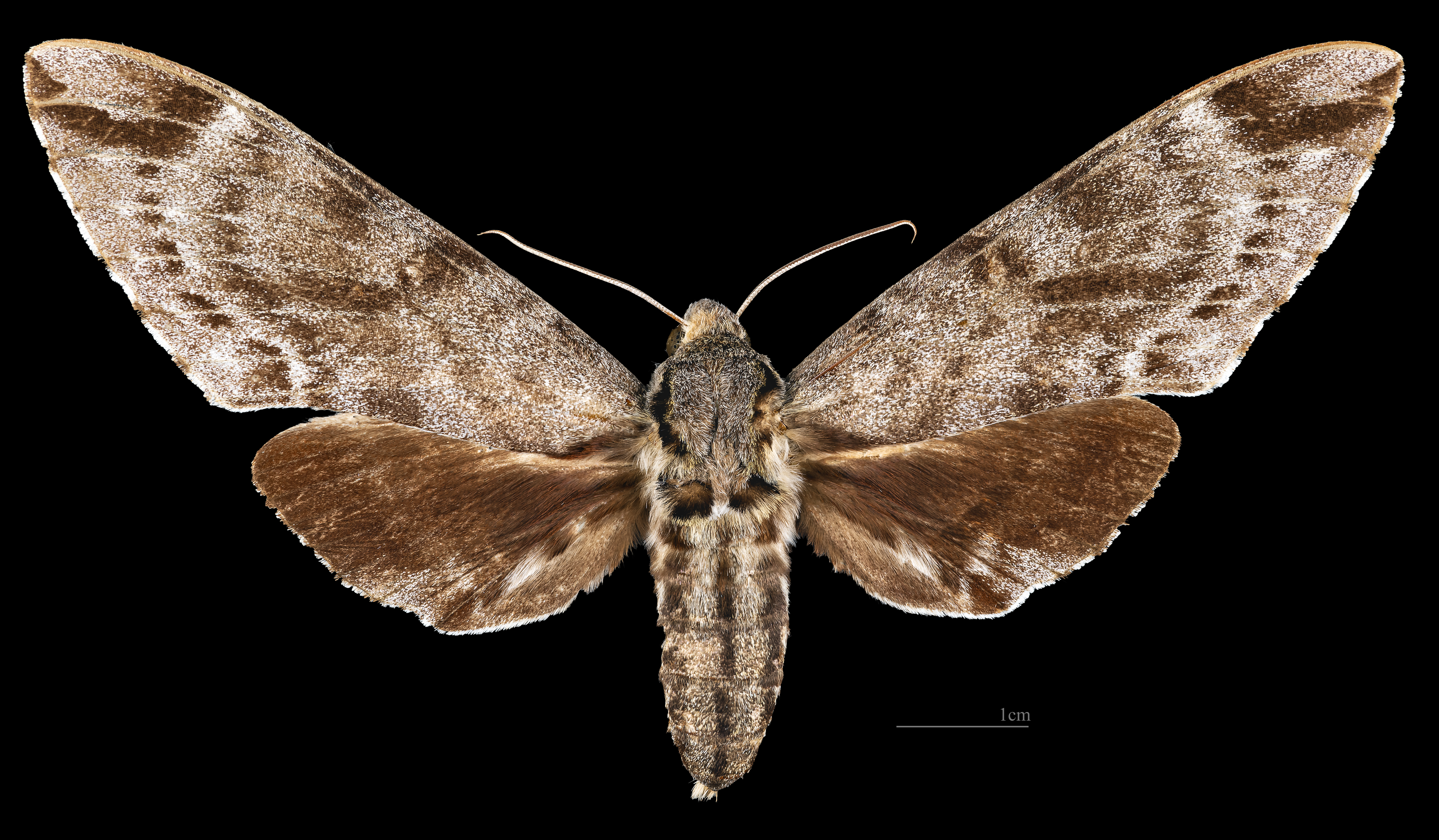
Female M. a. scribae , dorsal view

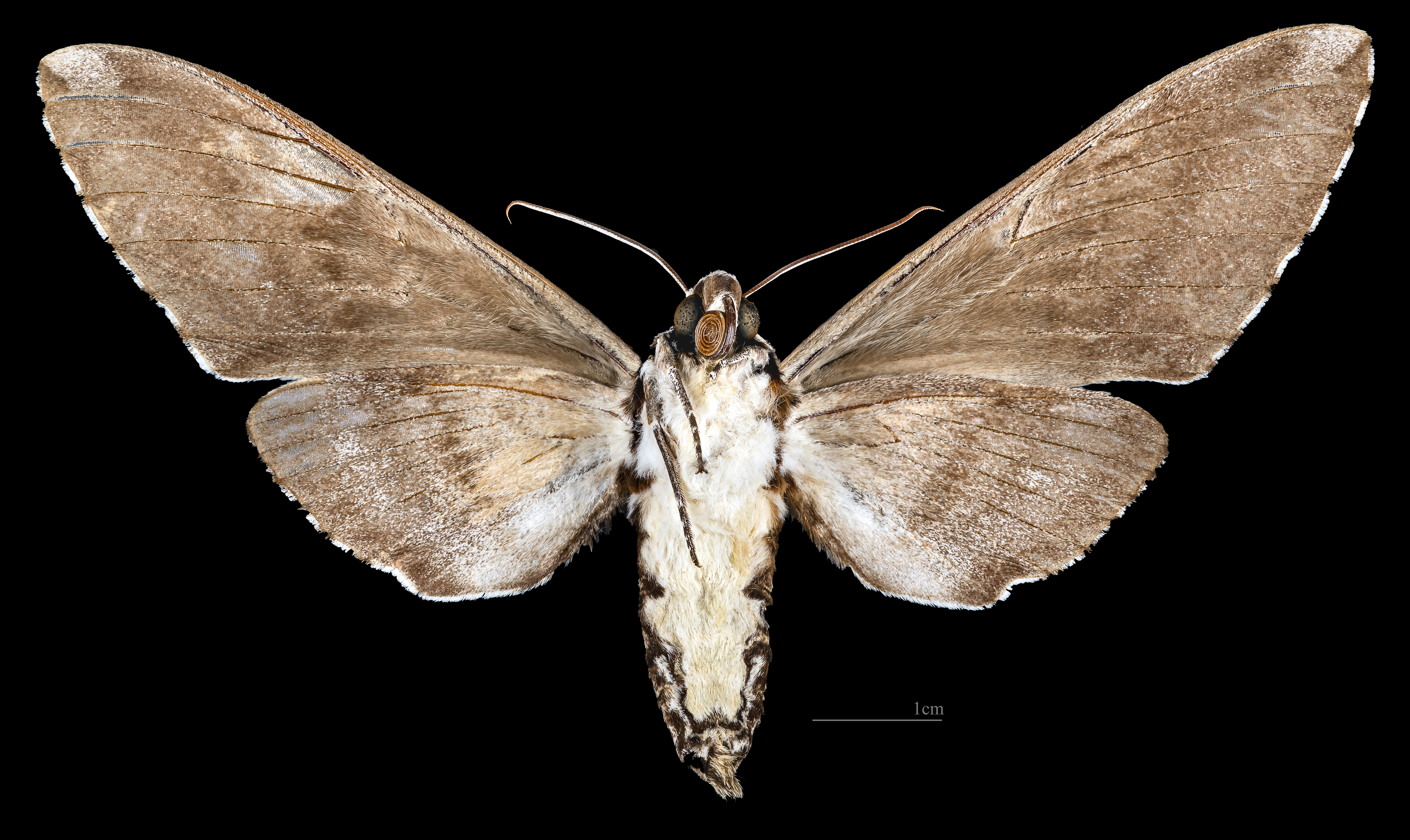
Female M. a. scribae , ventral view

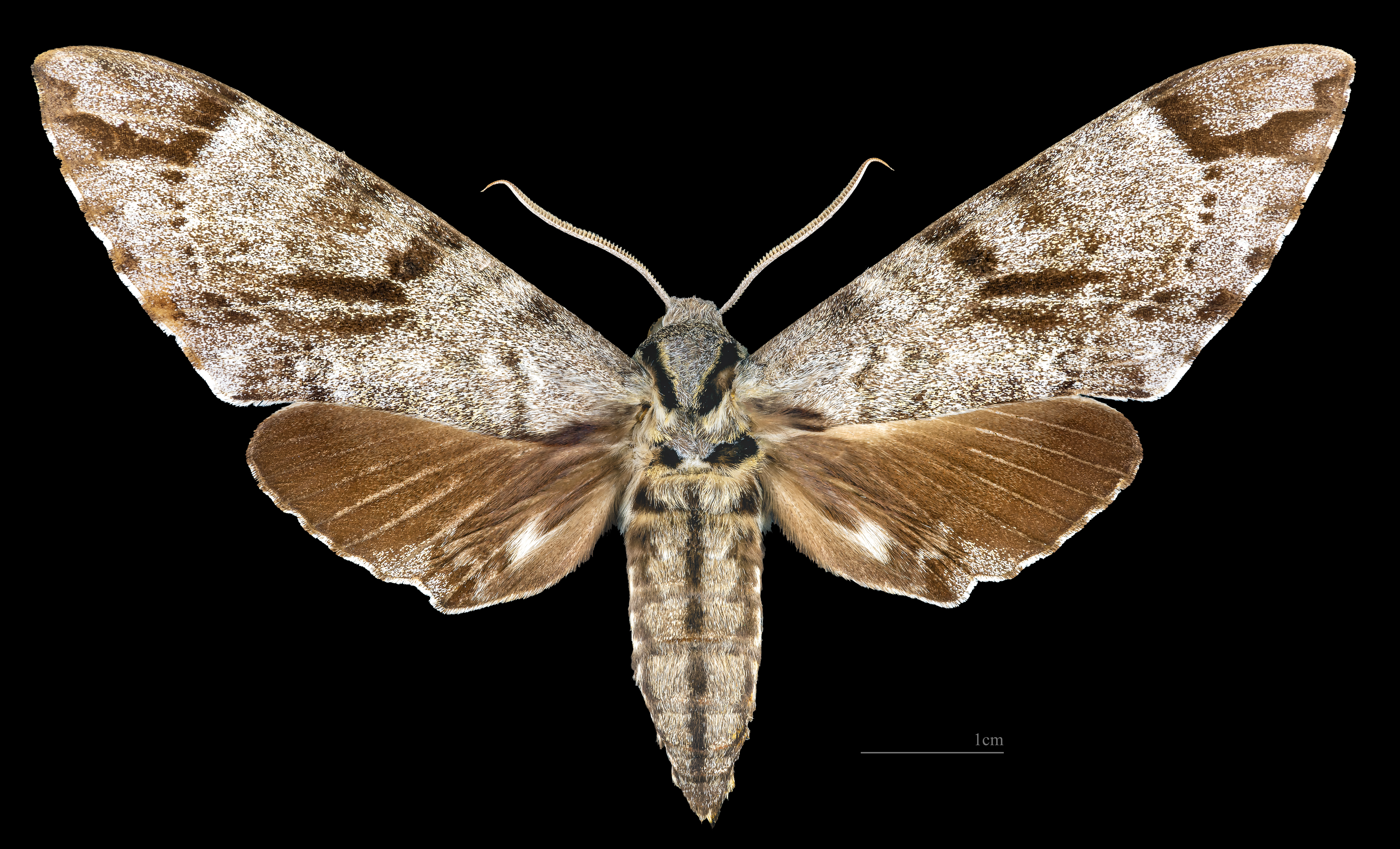
Male M. a. scribae , dorsal view

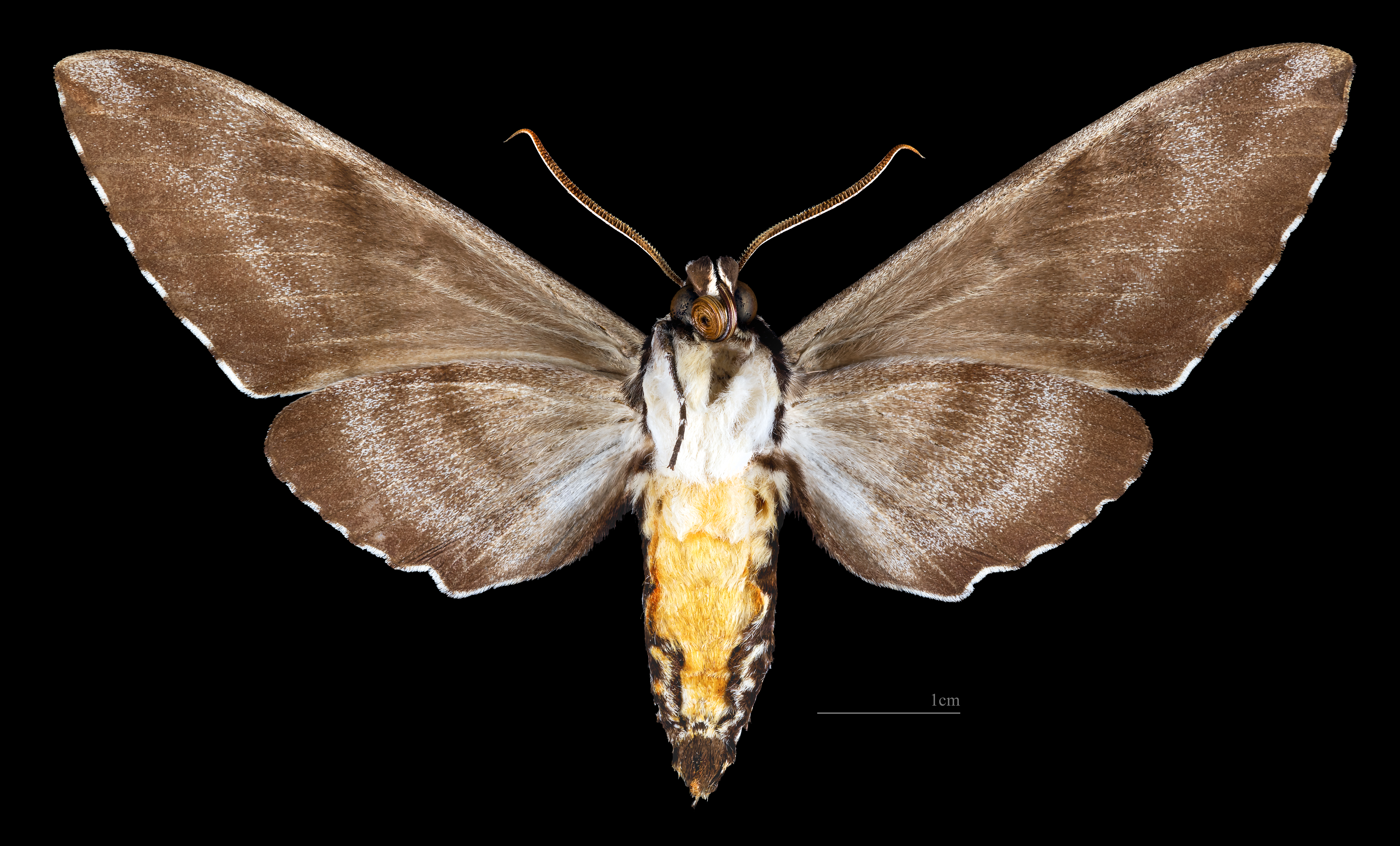
Male M. a. scribae , ventral view
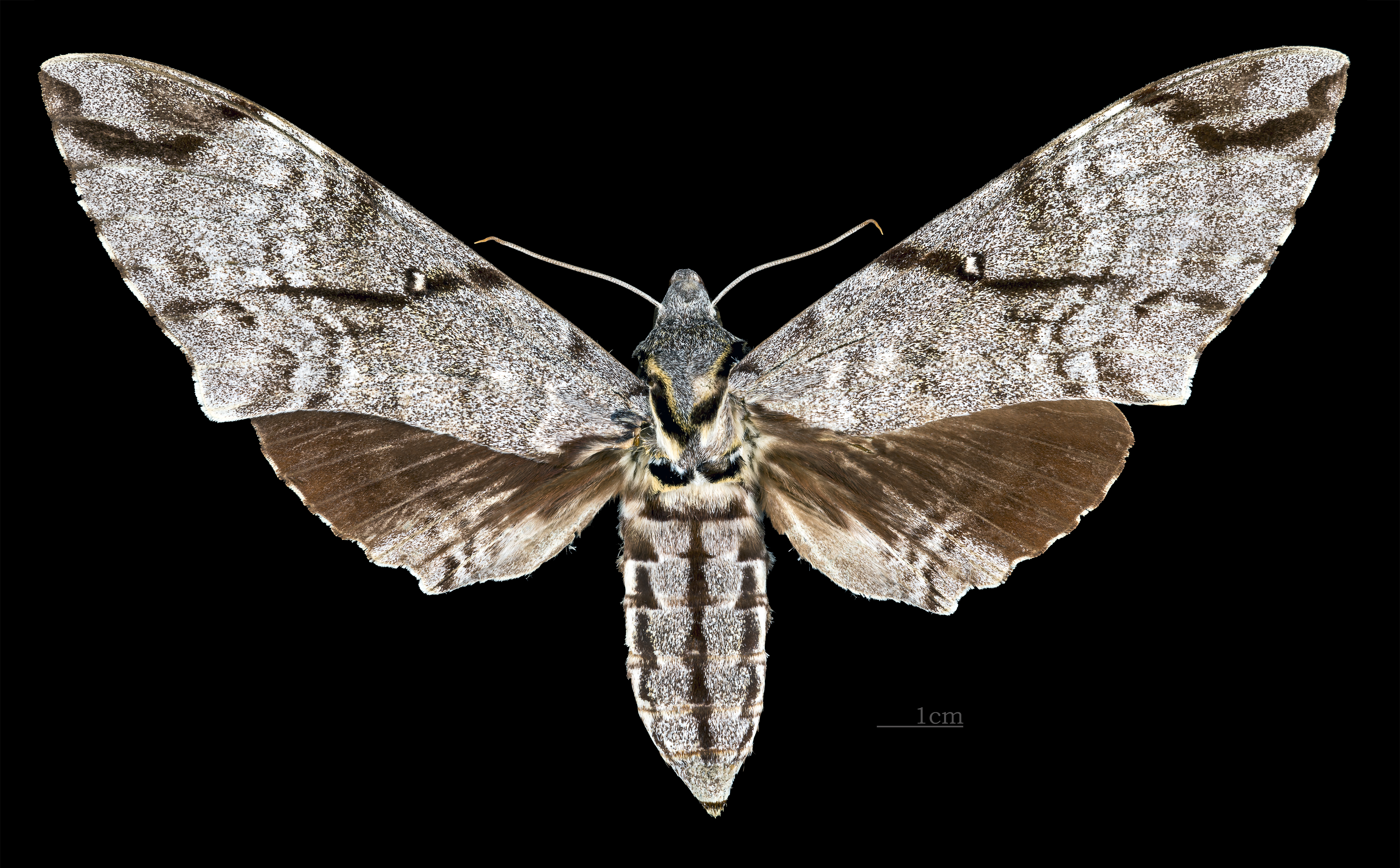
Female M. a. sumatranus, dorsal view

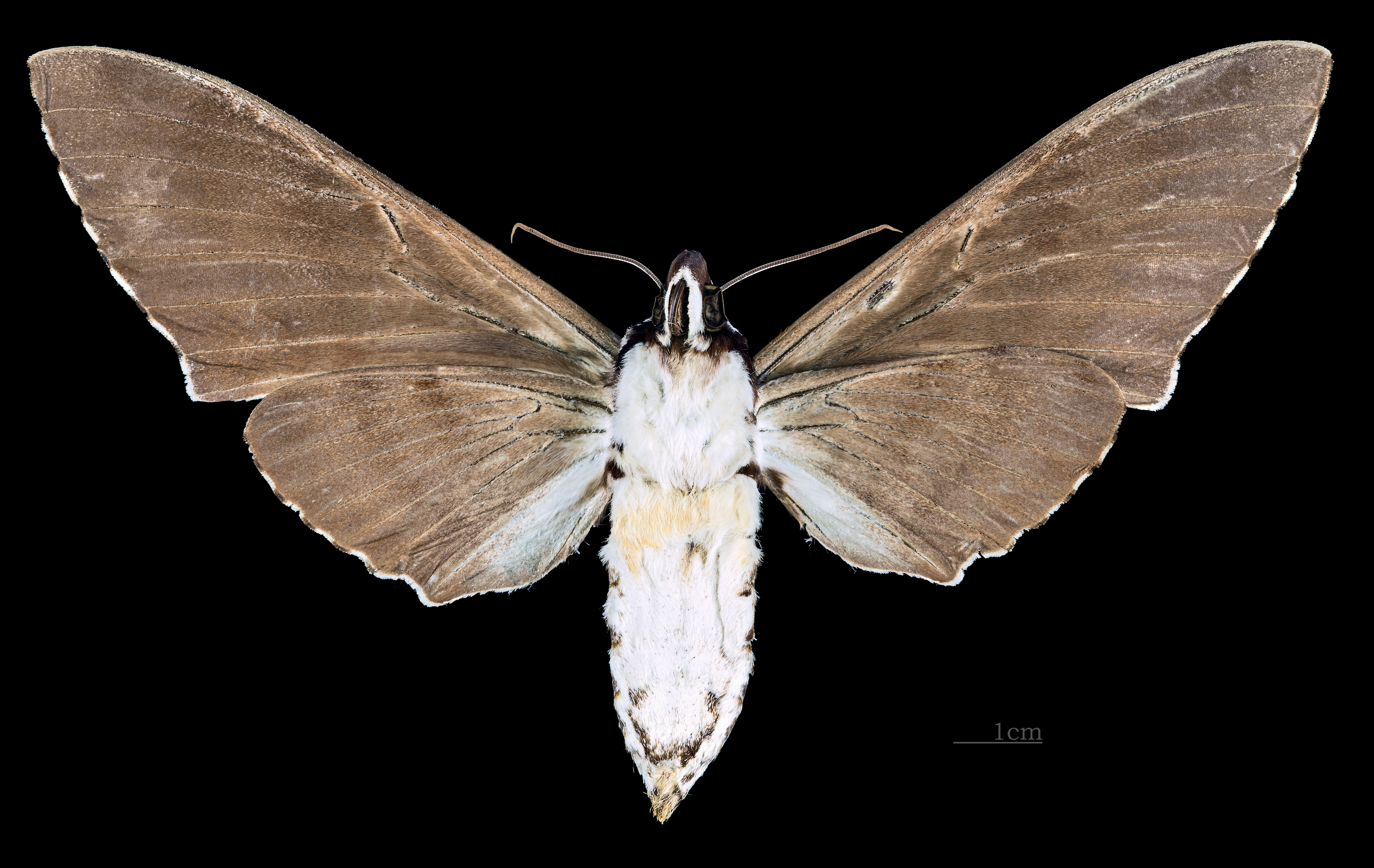
Female M. a. sumatranus, ventral view

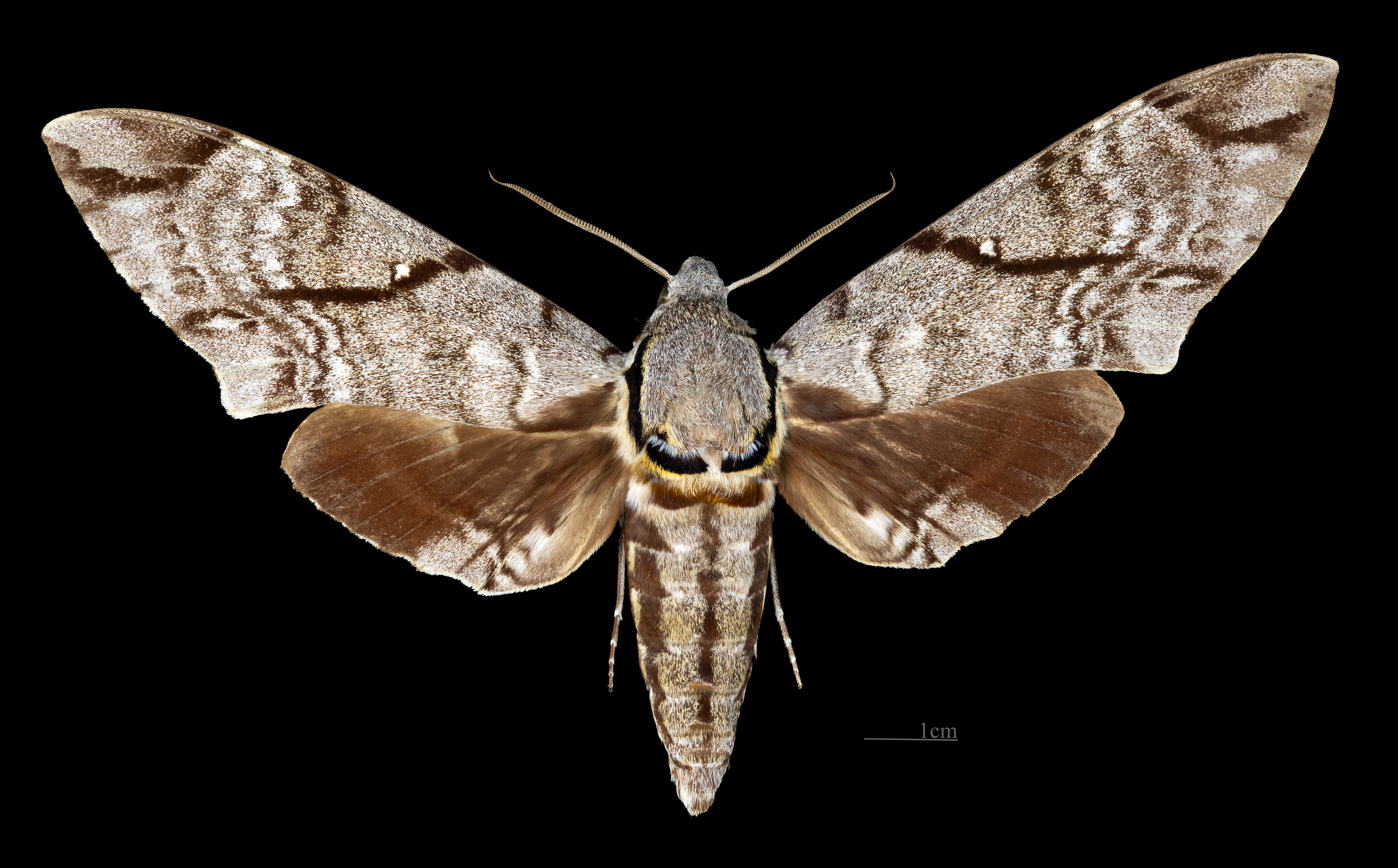
Male M. a. sumatranus, dorsal view

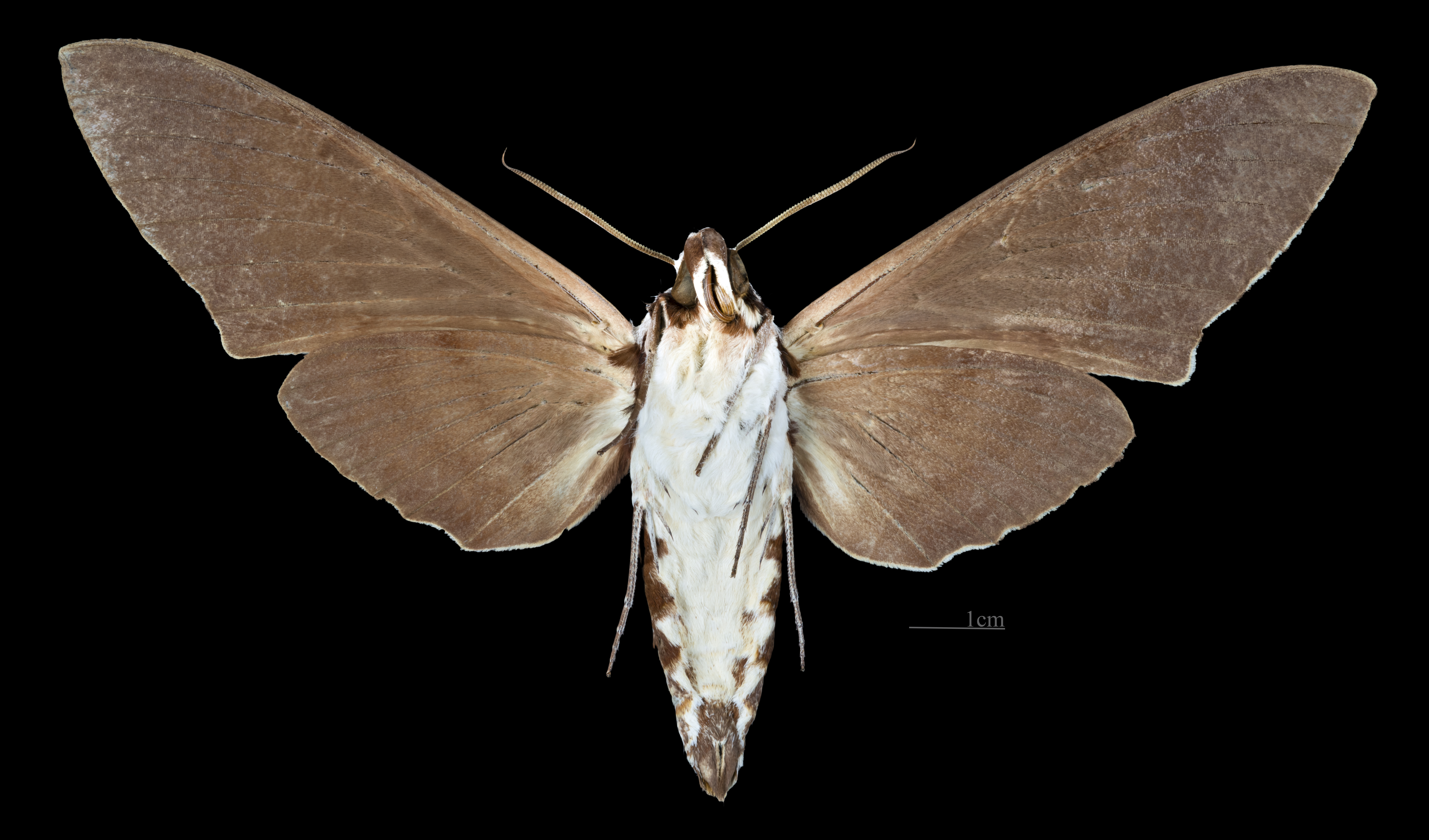
Male M. a. sumatranus, ventral view
