= Meganoton yunnanfuana =

Scientific classification
- Domain: Eukaryota
- Kingdom: Animalia
- Phylum: Arthropoda
- Class: Insecta
- Order: Lepidoptera
- Family: Sphingidae
- Genus: Meganoton
- Species: M. yunnanfuana

Binomial name
- Meganoton yunnanfuana Clark, 1925

Species of moth

Meganoton yunnanfuana is a moth of the family Sphingidae. It is known from Yunnan in southern China and northern Vietnam.
