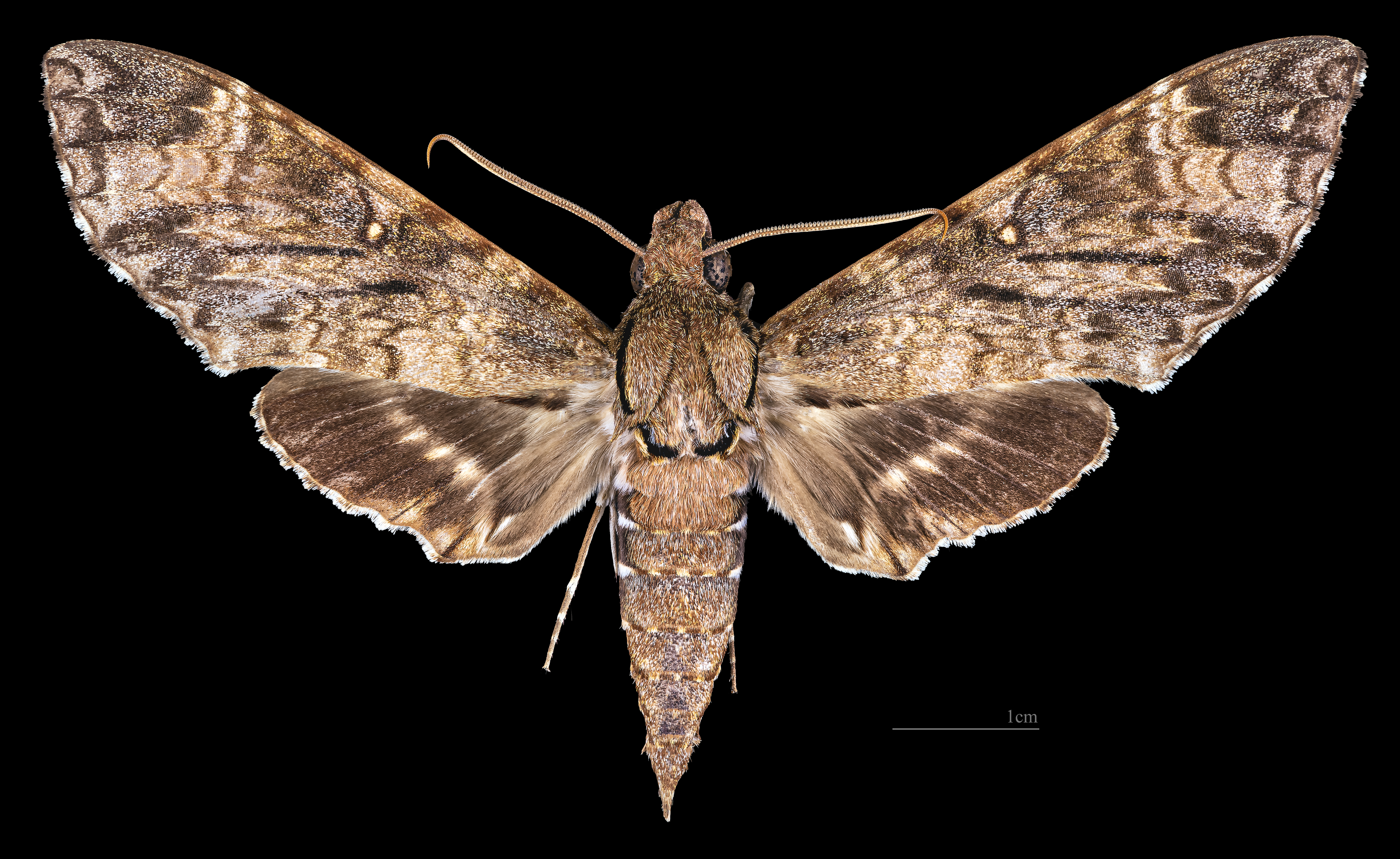
- Meganoton nyctiphanes

Scientific classification
- Kingdom: Animalia
- Phylum: Arthropoda
- Class: Insecta
- Order: Lepidoptera
- Family: Sphingidae
- Tribe: Sphingini
- Genus: Meganoton; Boisduval, [1875]

= Meganoton =

Genus of moths

Meganoton is a genus of moths in the family Sphingidae.

== Species ==
- Meganoton analis (R. Felder, 1874)
- Meganoton hyloicoides Rothschild, 1910
- Meganoton loeffleri Eitschberger, 2003
- Meganoton nyctiphanes (Walker, 1856)
- Meganoton rubescens Butler, 1876
- Meganoton yunnanfuana Clark, 1925
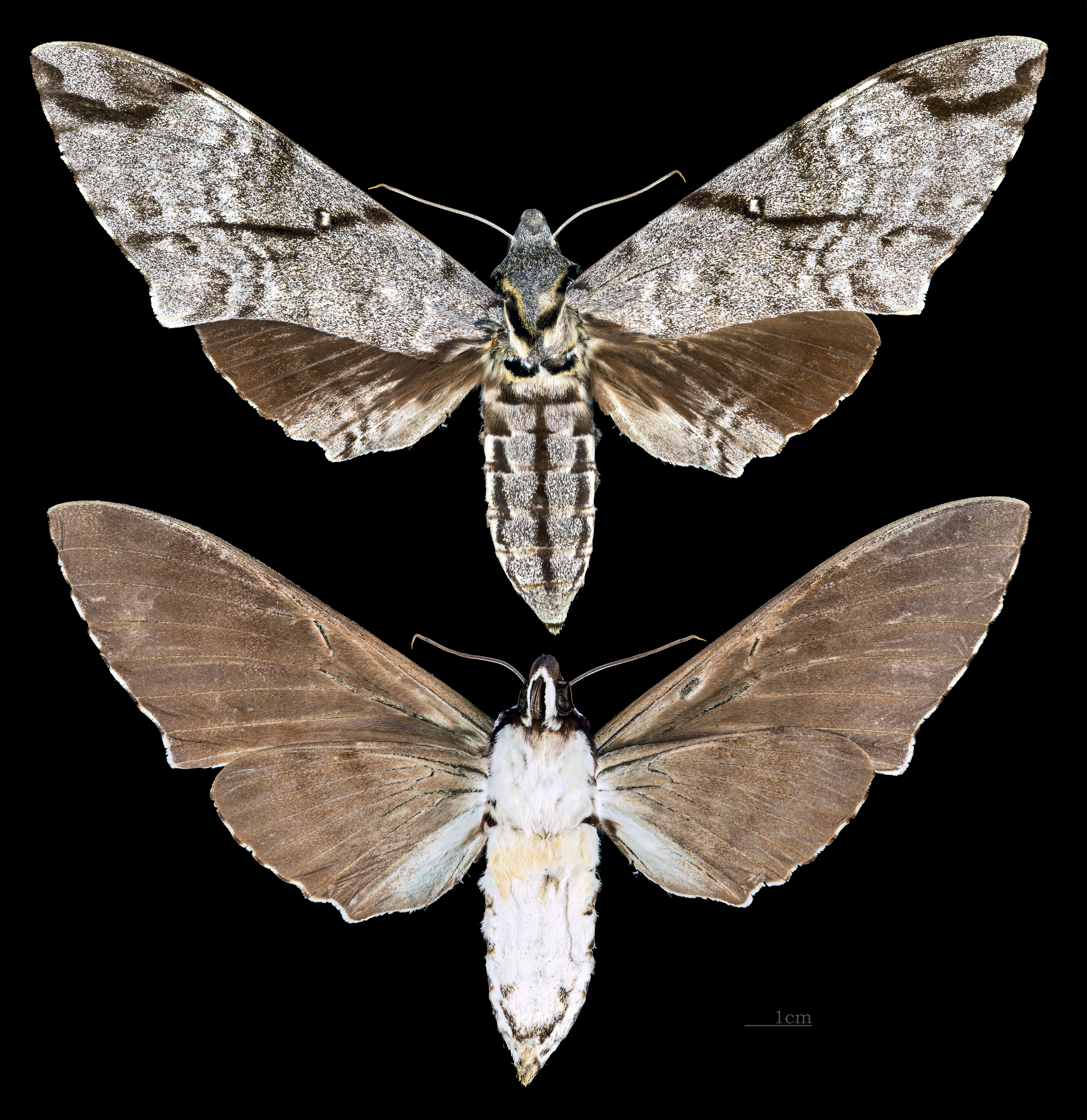
Meganoton analis

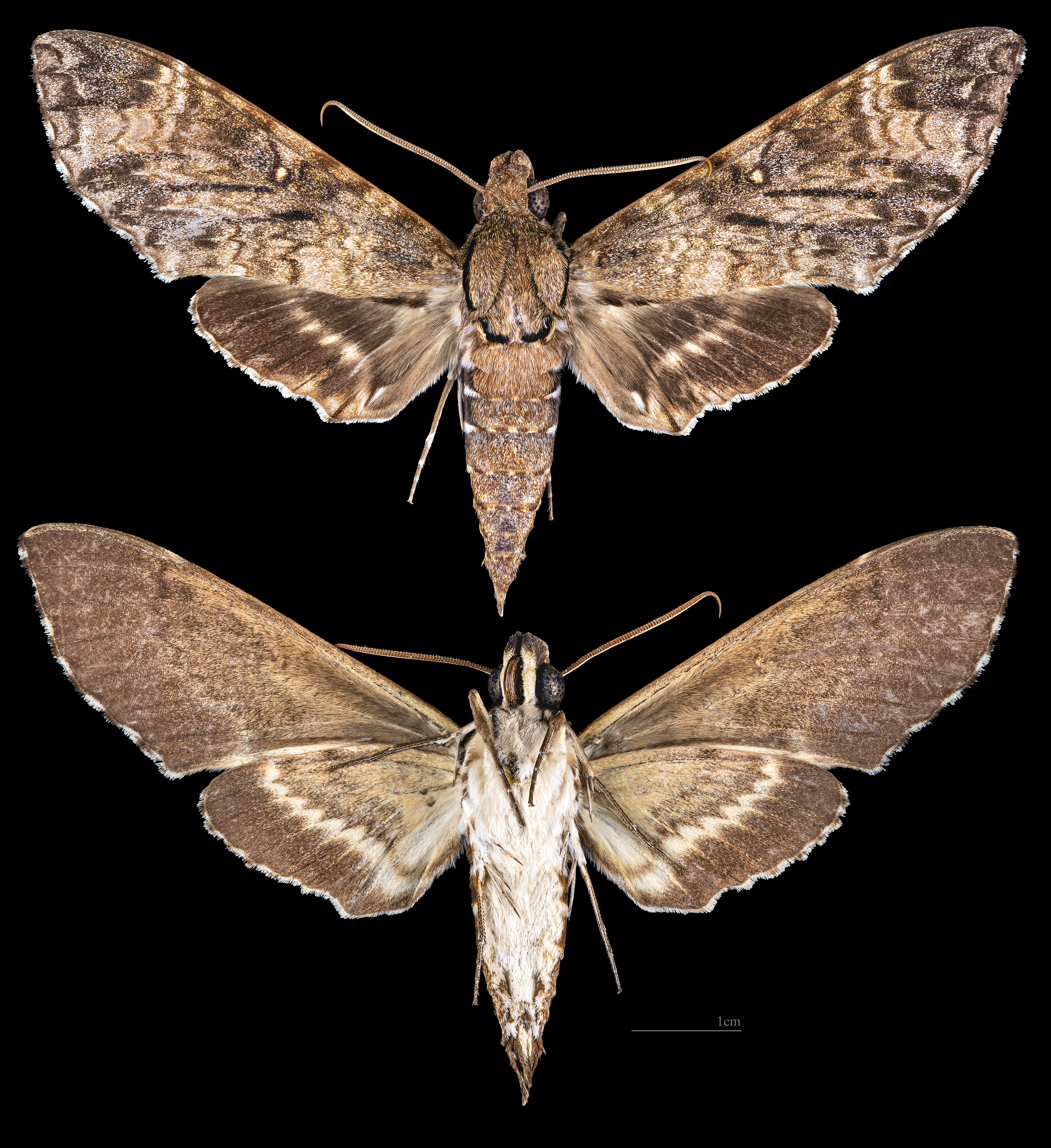
Meganoton nyctiphanes

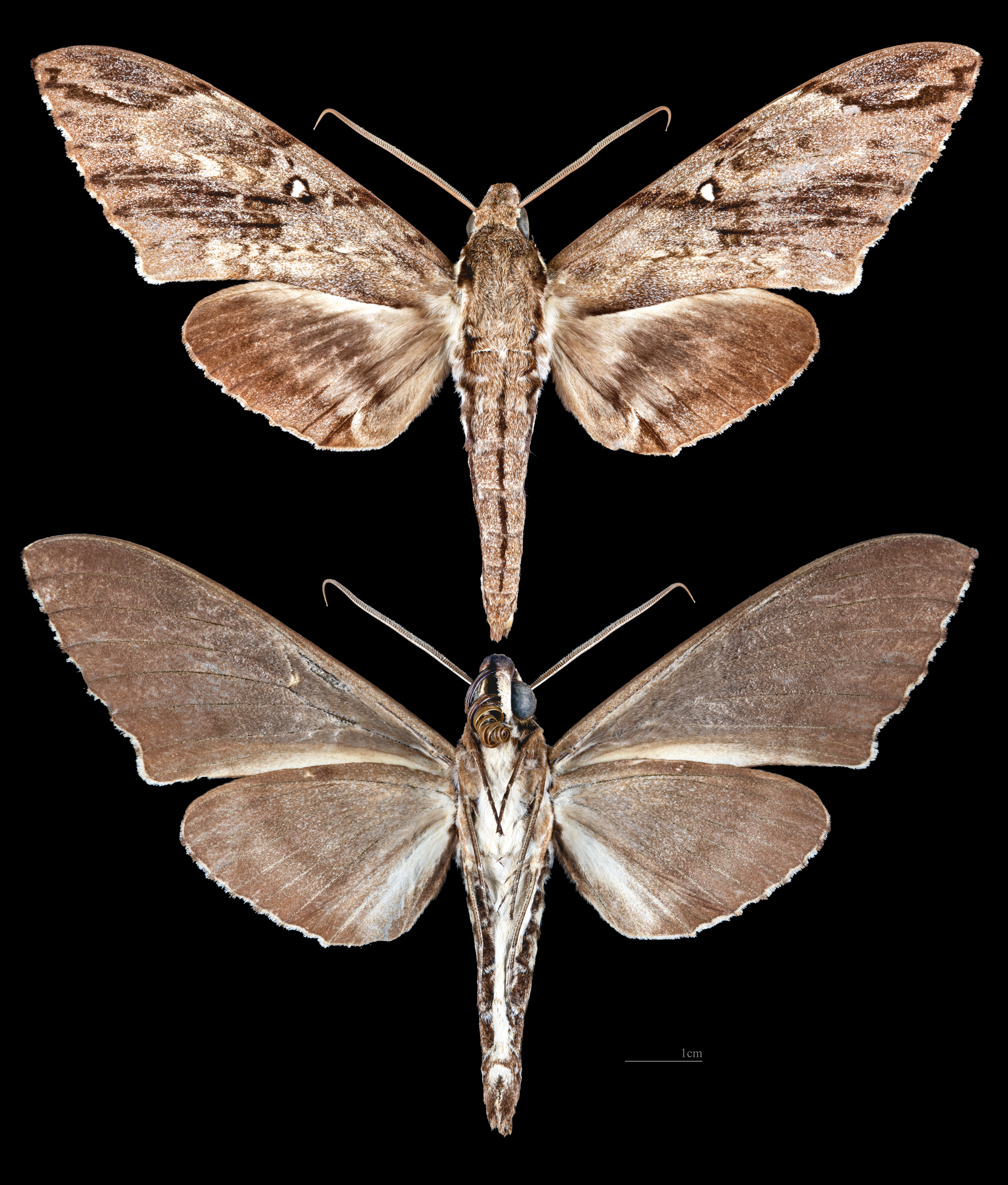
Meganoton rubescens
