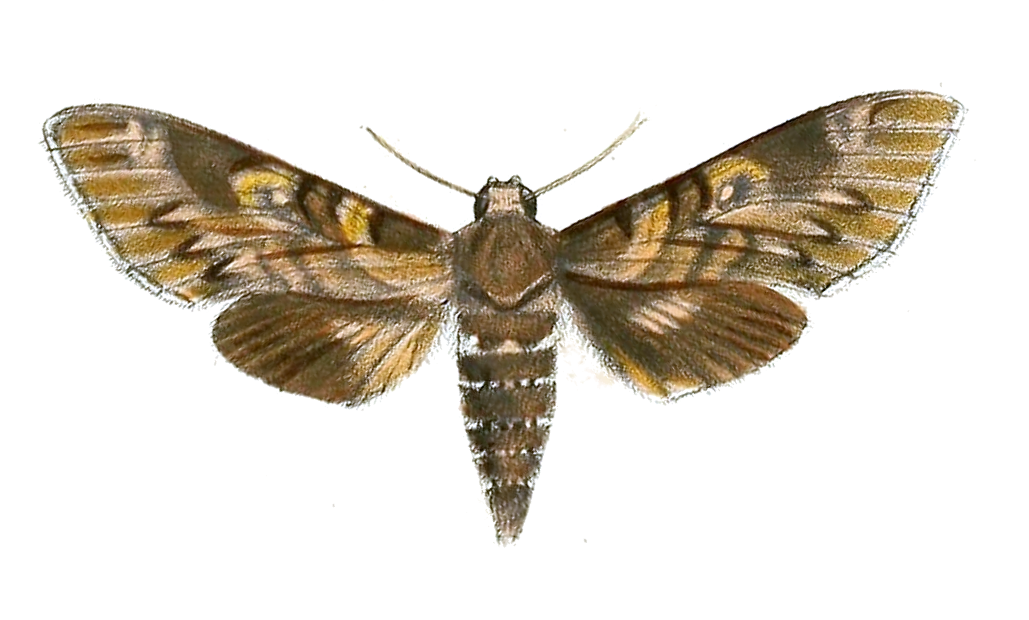
- Meganoton nyctiphanes

Scientific classification
- Domain: Eukaryota
- Kingdom: Animalia
- Phylum: Arthropoda
- Class: Insecta
- Order: Lepidoptera
- Family: Sphingidae
- Genus: Meganoton
- Species: M. nyctiphanes

Binomial name
- Meganoton nyctiphanes (Walker, 1856)

Synonyms
- Macrosila nyctiphanes Walker, 1856; Pseudosphinx cyrtolophia Butler, 1875

= Meganoton nyctiphanes =

Species of moth

Meganoton nyctiphanes, the dull double-bristled hawkmoth, is a moth of the family Sphingidae.

== Distribution ==
It is known from Sri Lanka, India, Bangladesh, Myanmar, the Nicobar Islands, the Andaman Islands, south-eastern China, Thailand, Vietnam, Malaysia, Sumatra, Indonesia and the Philippines (Palawan).

== Description ==
The wingspan is 120–140 mm.

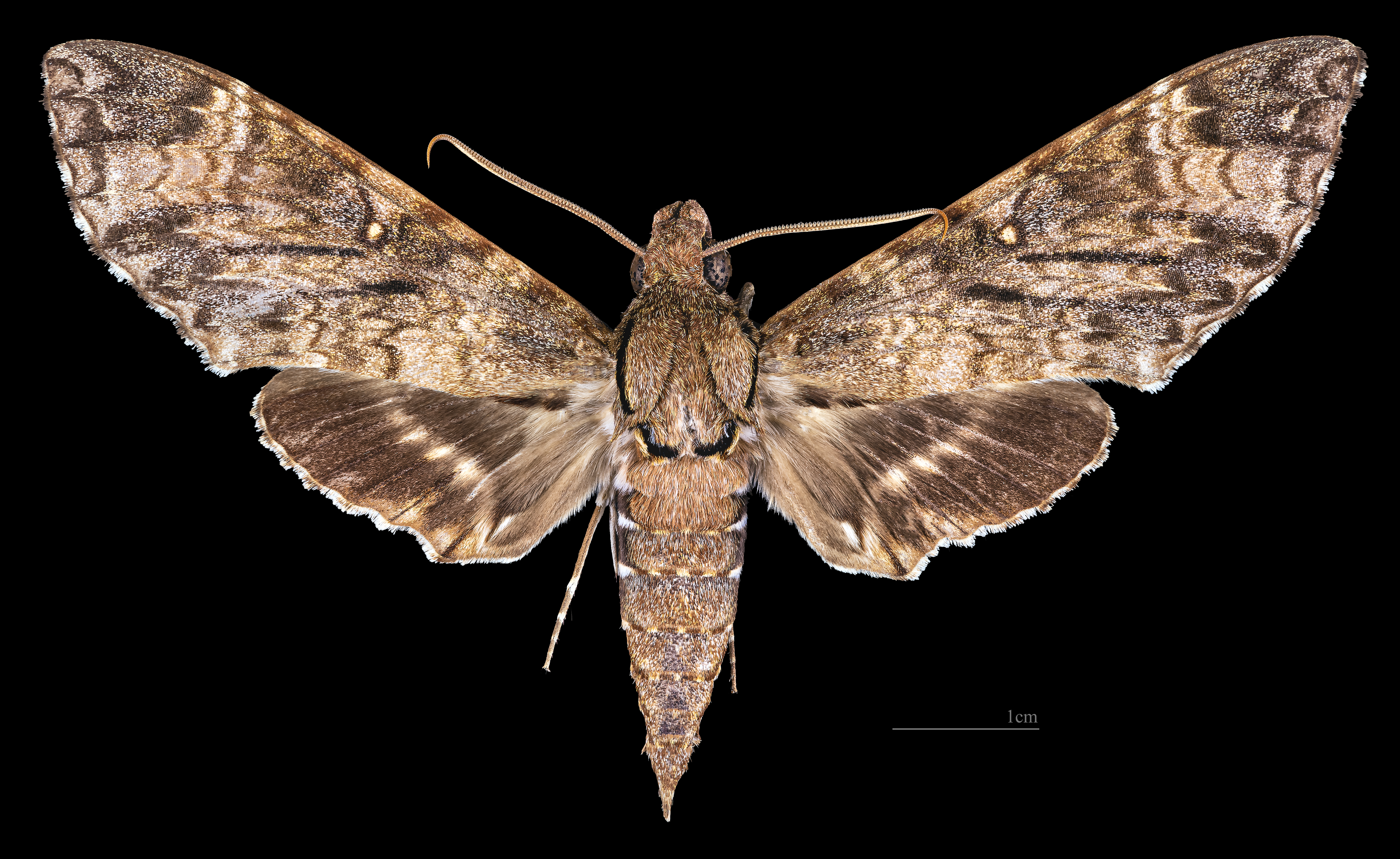
Male dorsal

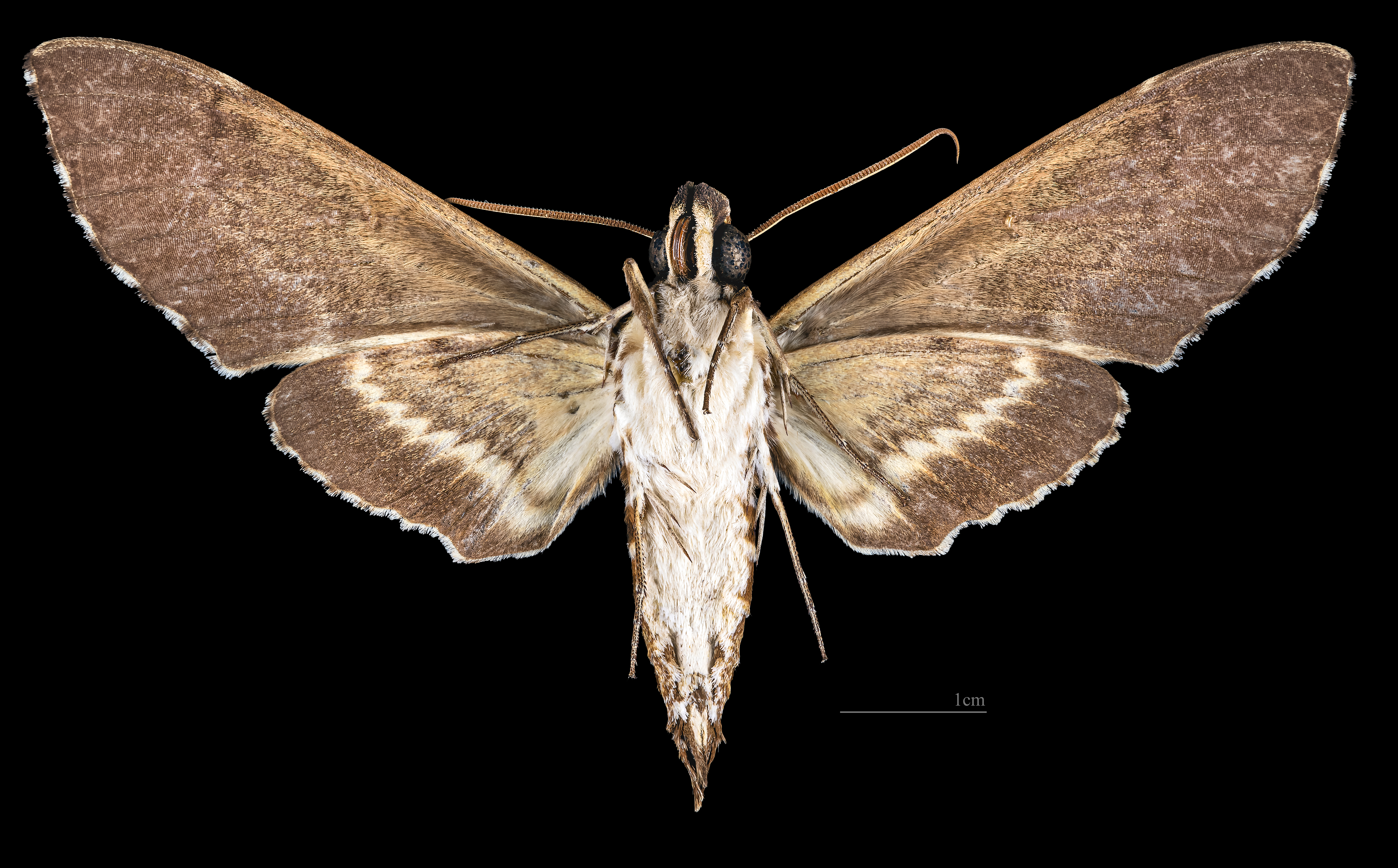
Male ventral

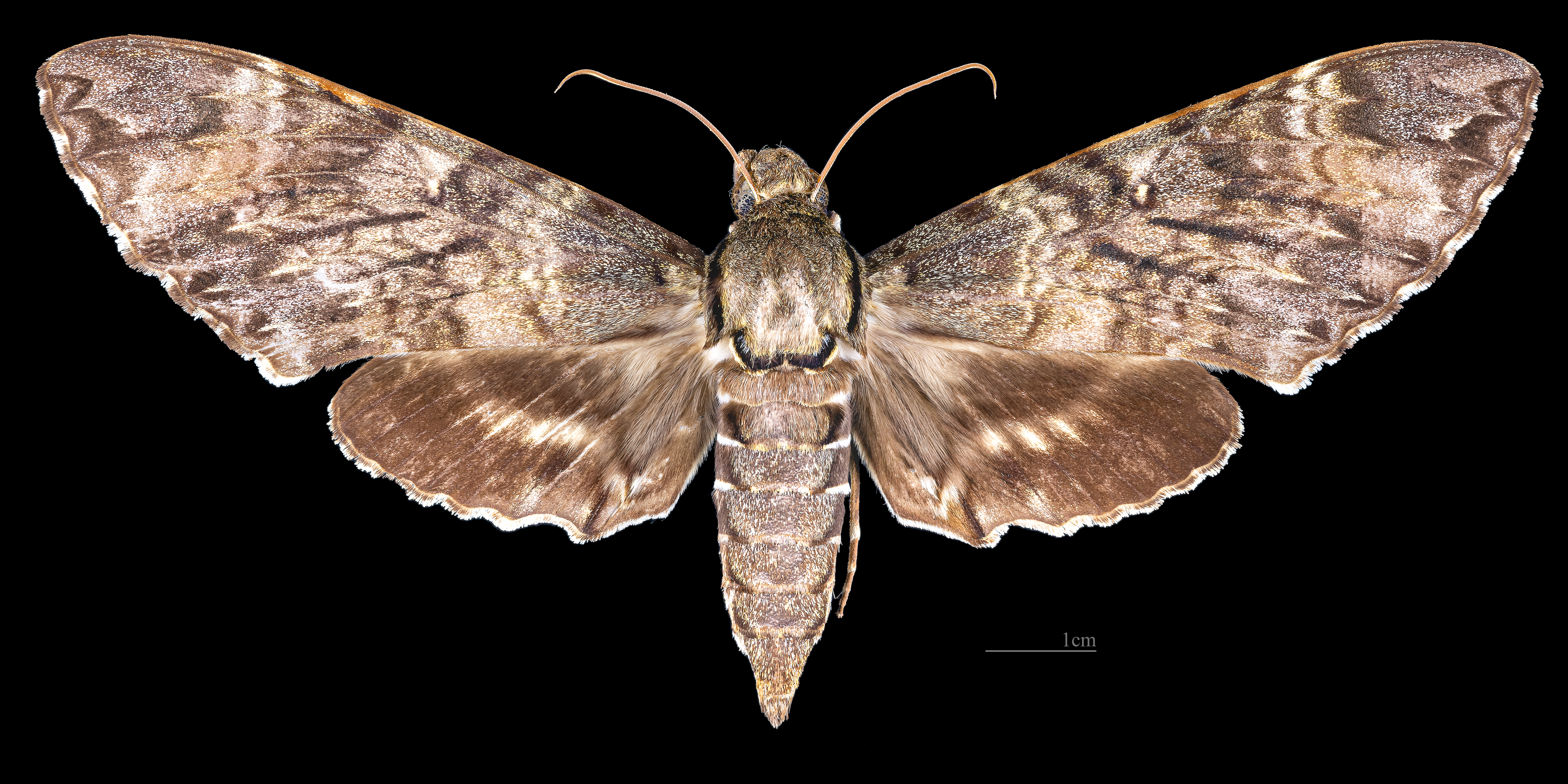
Female dorsal

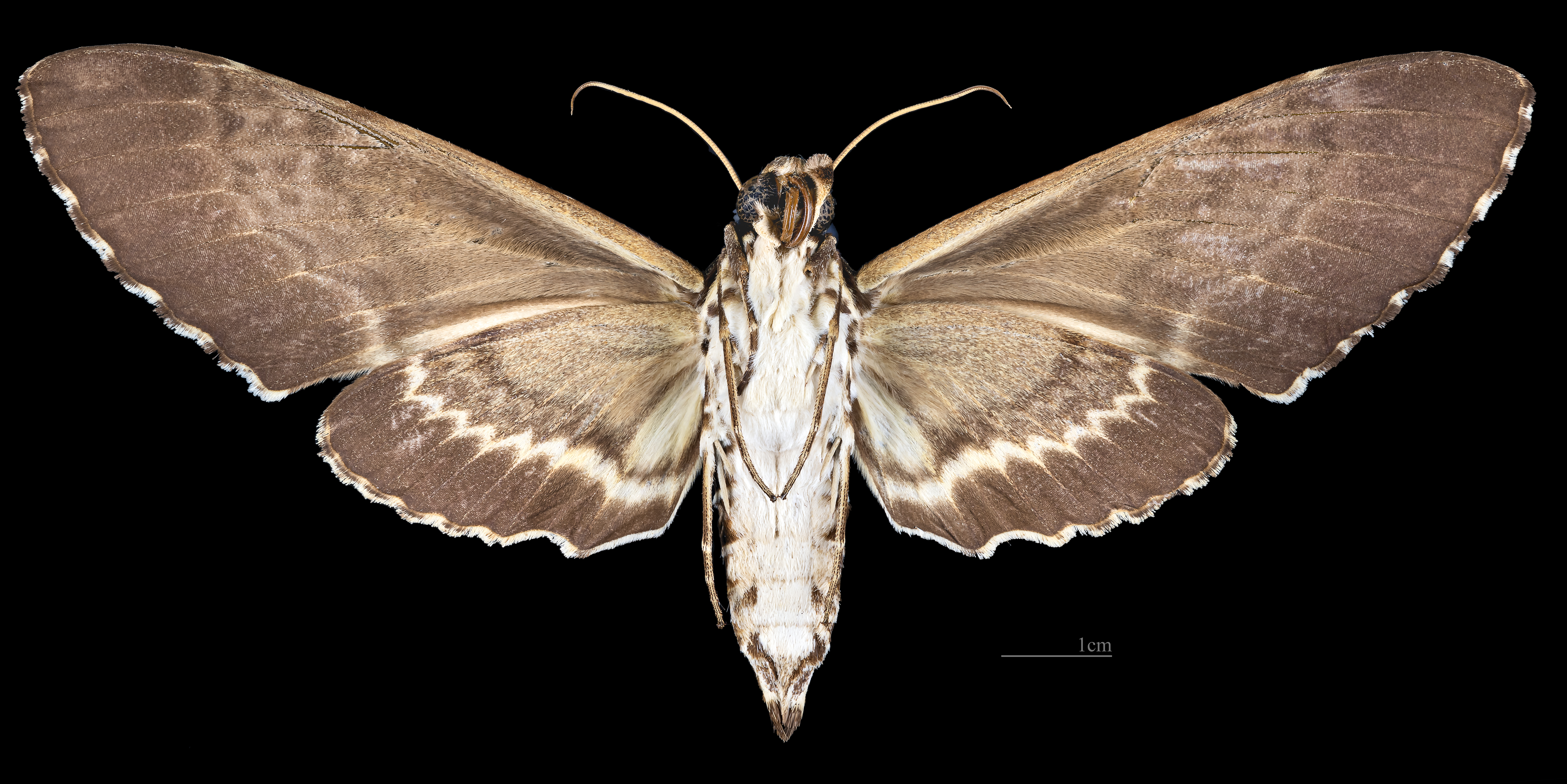
Female ventral

== Biology ==
The larvae have been recorded feeding on Symphorema involucratum in Thailand.
