= Meganoton loeffleri =

Scientific classification
- Kingdom: Animalia
- Phylum: Arthropoda
- Class: Insecta
- Order: Lepidoptera
- Family: Sphingidae
- Genus: Meganoton
- Species: M. loeffleri

Binomial name
- Meganoton loeffleri Eitschberger, 2003

Species of moth

Meganoton loeffleri is a moth of the family Sphingidae. It is known from Thailand.
