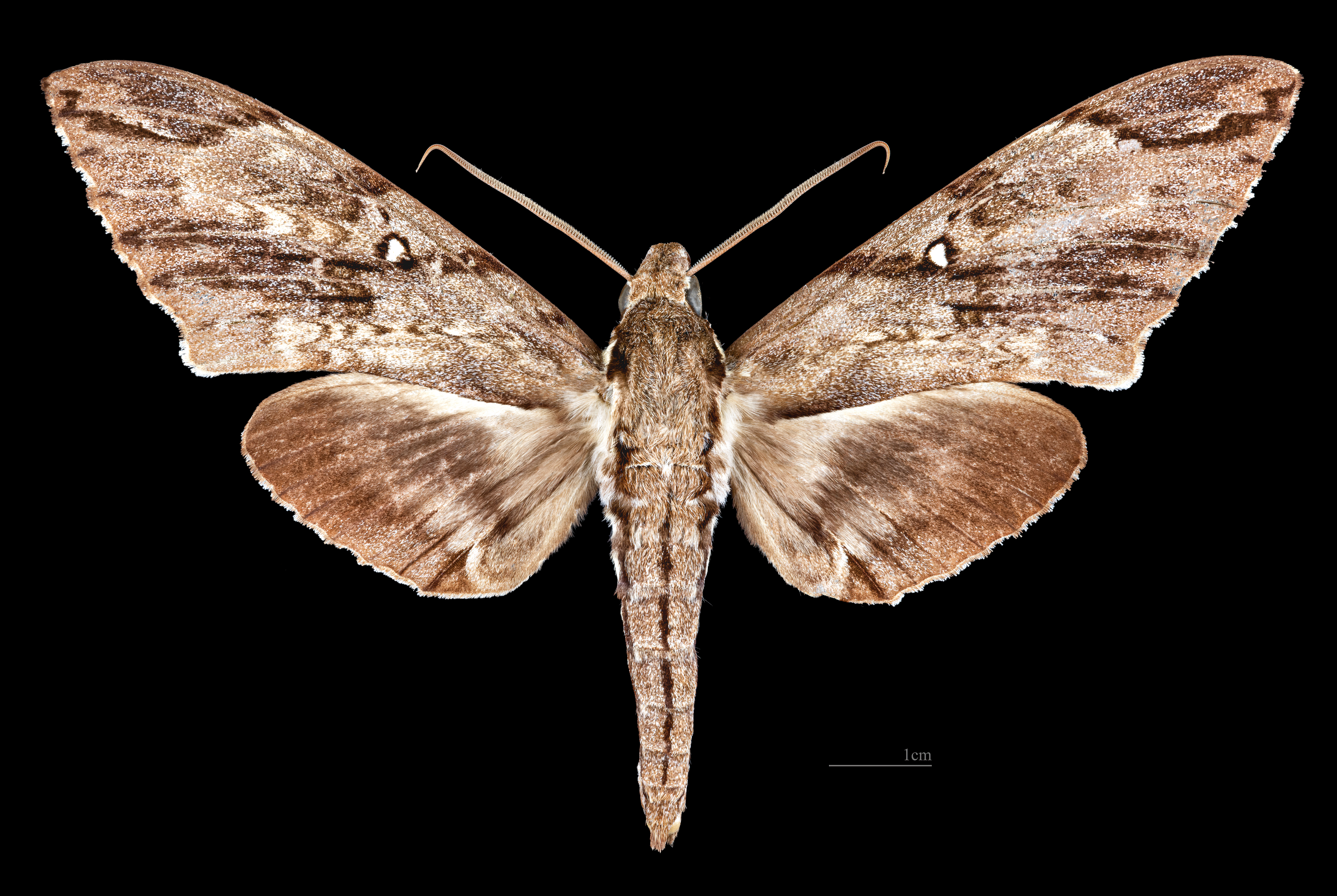
- Male dorsal
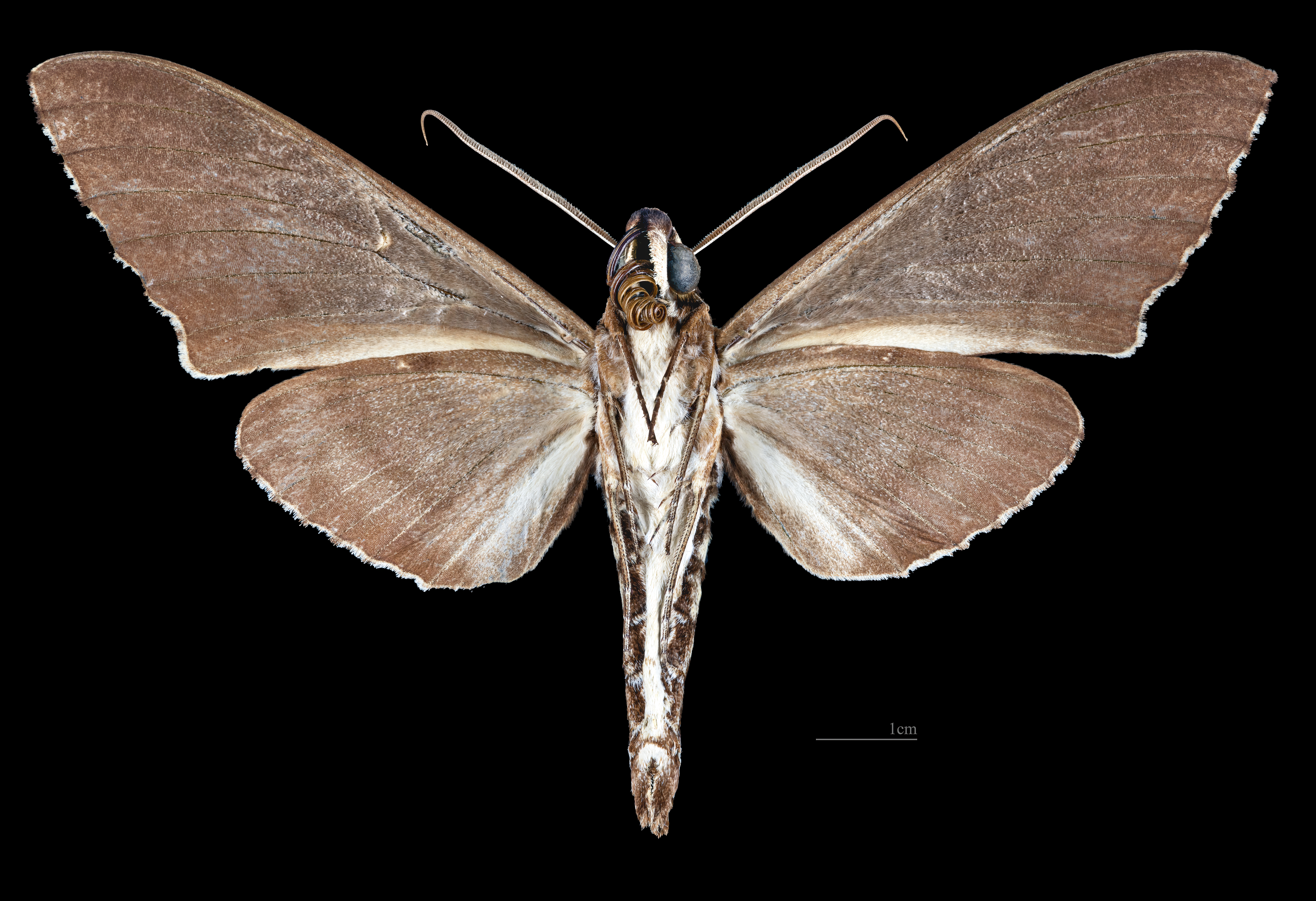
- Male ventral

Scientific classification
- Domain: Eukaryota
- Kingdom: Animalia
- Phylum: Arthropoda
- Class: Insecta
- Order: Lepidoptera
- Family: Sphingidae
- Genus: Meganoton
- Species: M. rubescens

Binomial name
- Meganoton rubescens Butler, 1876

Synonyms
- Diludia rufescens Butler, 1875; Macrosila rubescens; Meganoton cocytoides Rothschild, 1894; Meganoton rubescens dracomontis Mell, 1922; Macrosila rubescens severina Miskin, 1891

= Meganoton rubescens =

Species of moth

Meganoton rubescens, the rosy double-bristled hawkmoth, is a moth of the family Sphingidae. It is known from north-eastern India, central and northern Thailand, southern China, northern Vietnam, Malaysia, Indonesia, the Philippines, Papua New Guinea, northern Australia and the Solomon Islands.

== Subspecies ==
- Meganoton rubescens rubescens (north-eastern India, central and northern Thailand, southern China and northern Vietnam)
- Meganoton rubescens amboinicus Clark, 1938 (Moluccas)
- Meganoton rubescens philippinensis Clark, 1938 (Philippines)
- Meganoton rubescens severina (Miskin, 1891) (Papua New Guinea, northern Australia, Solomon Islands)
- Meganoton rubescens thielei Huwe, 1906 (Borneo, Sumatra, Malaysia)
- Meganoton rubescens titan Gehlen, 1933 (Moluccas)

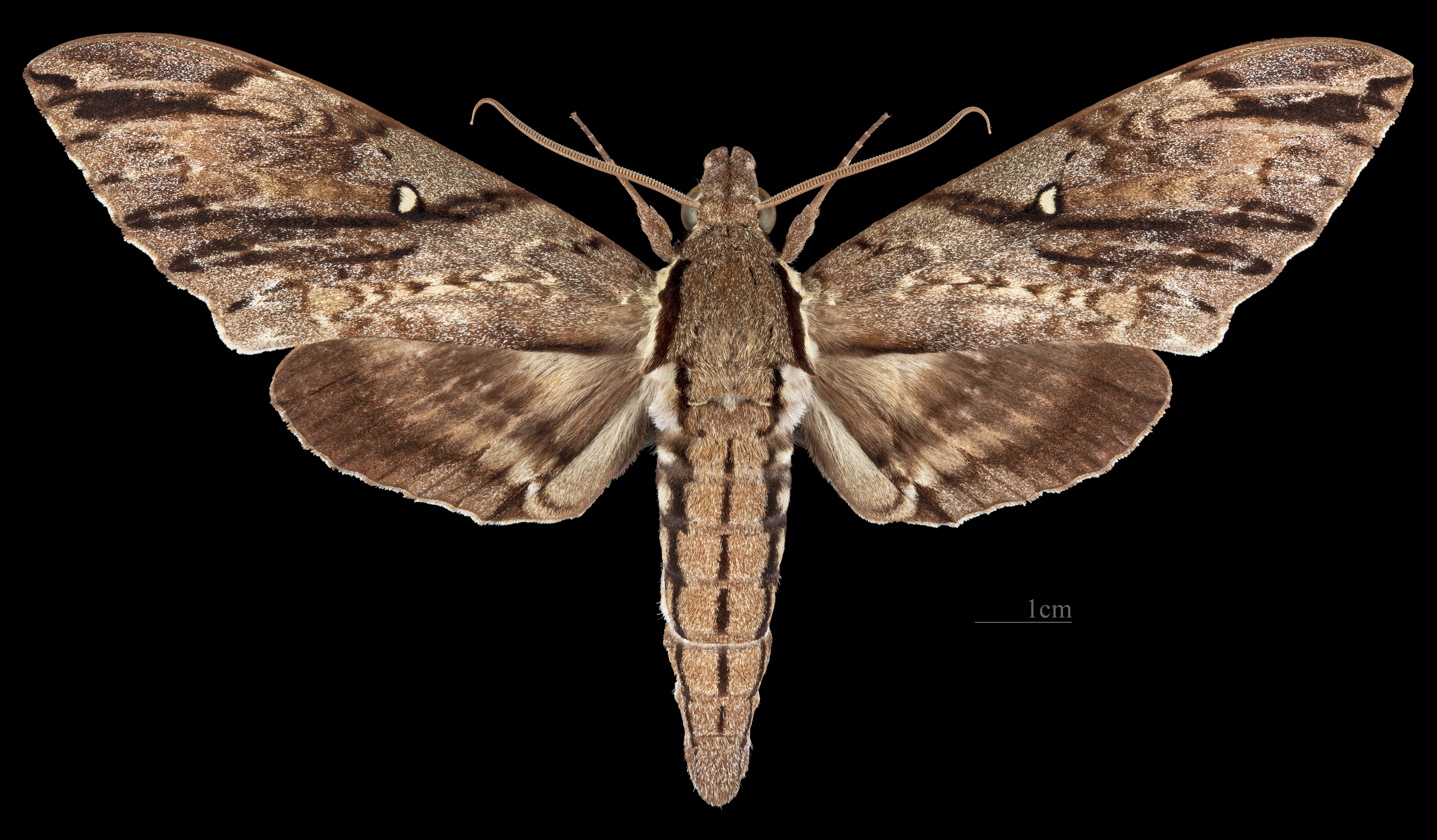
Meganoton rubescens severina♀

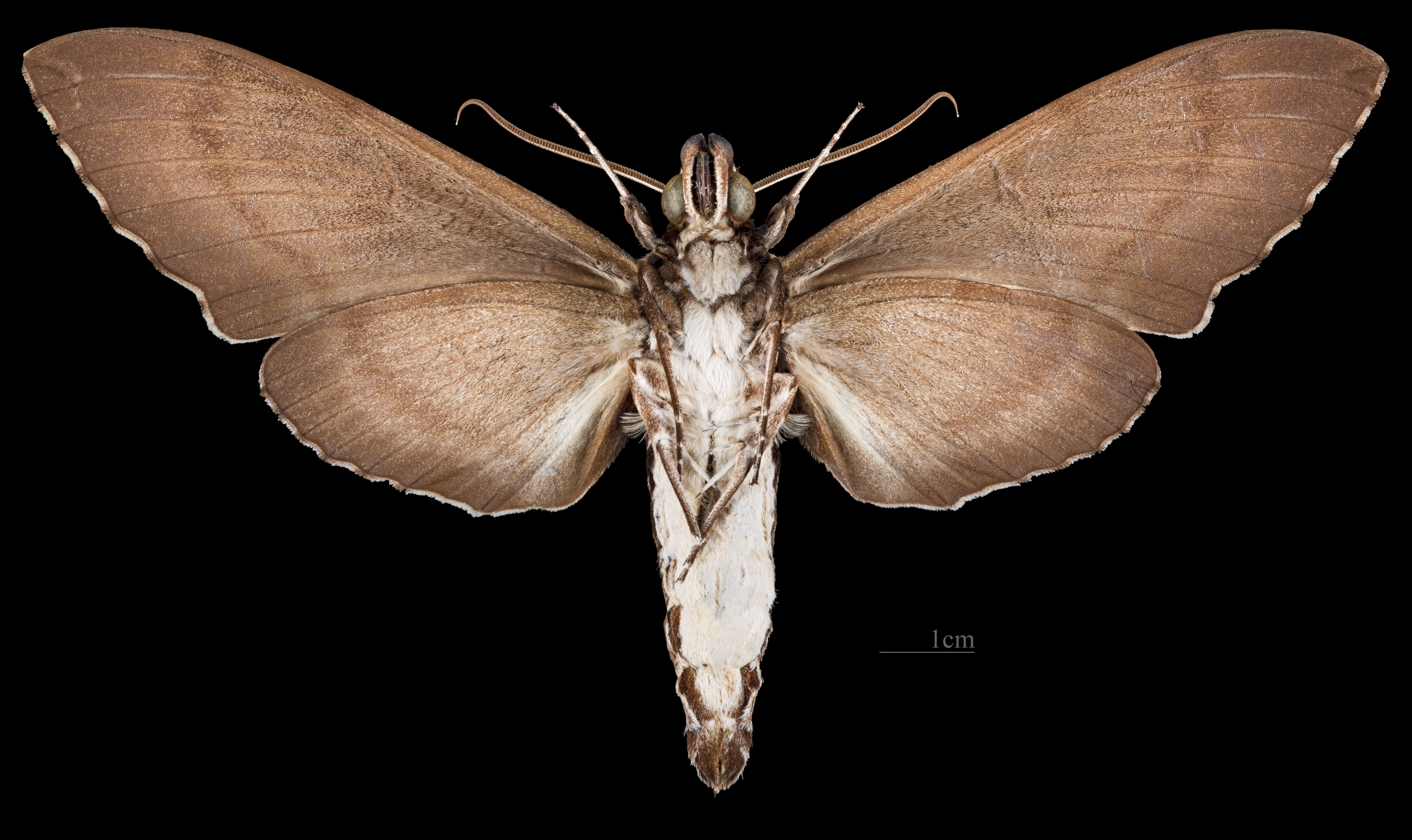
Meganoton rubescens severina♀ △

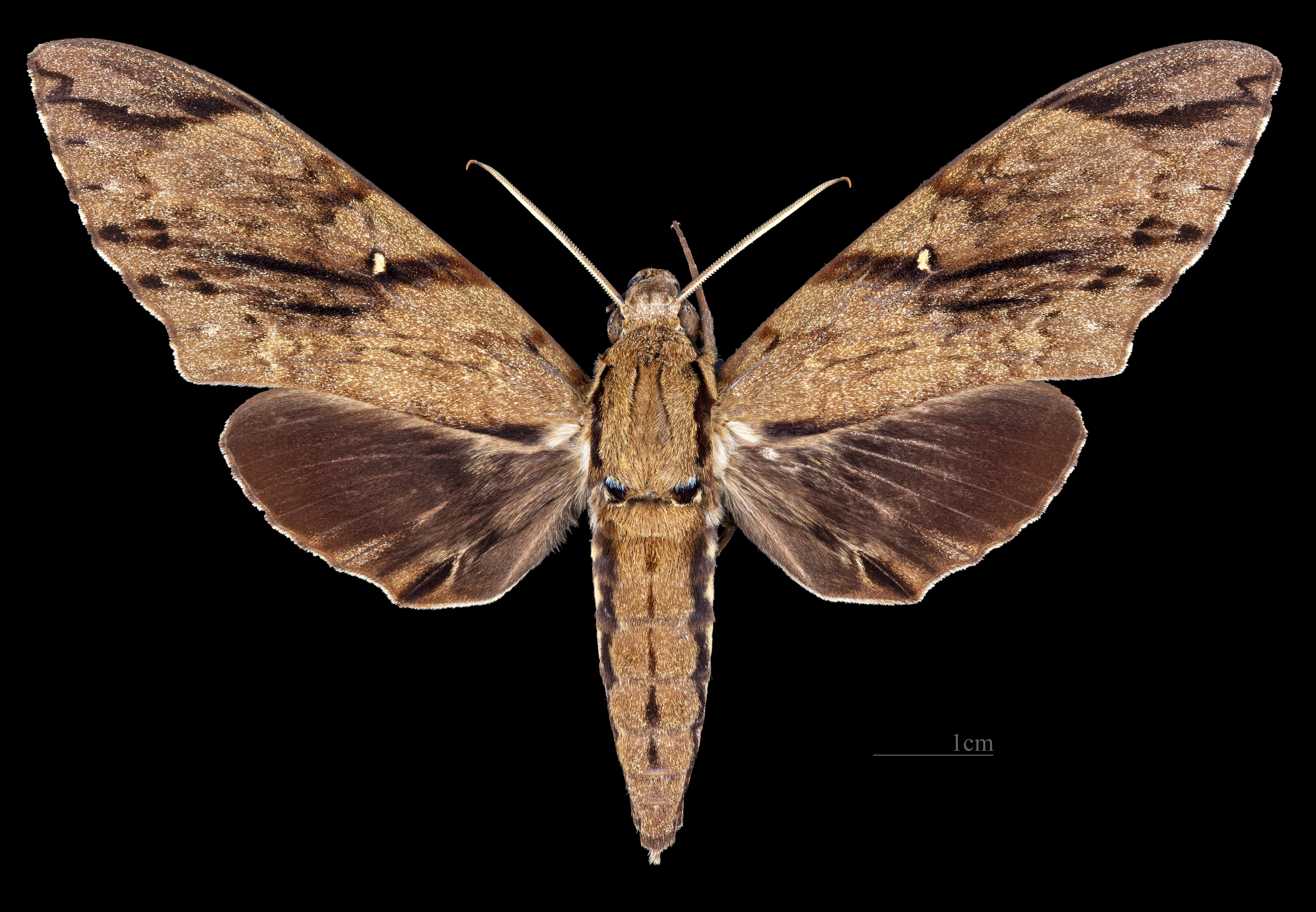
Meganoton rubescens thielei ♂

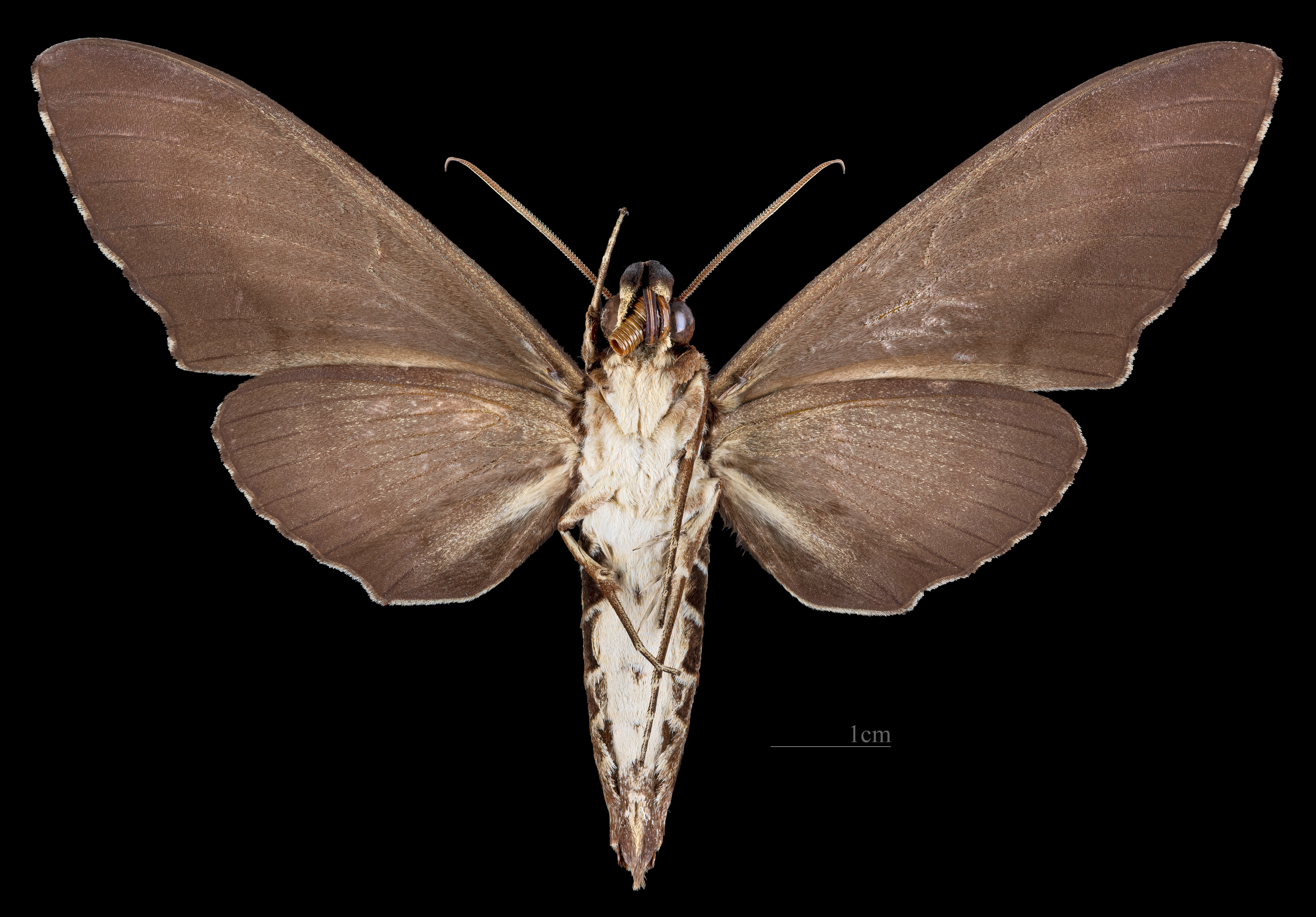
Meganoton rubescens thielei ♂ △
